= Chromosome 1 =

Human chromosome

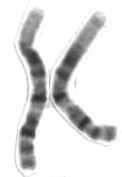
- Human chromosome 1 pair after G-banding. One is from mother, one is from father.

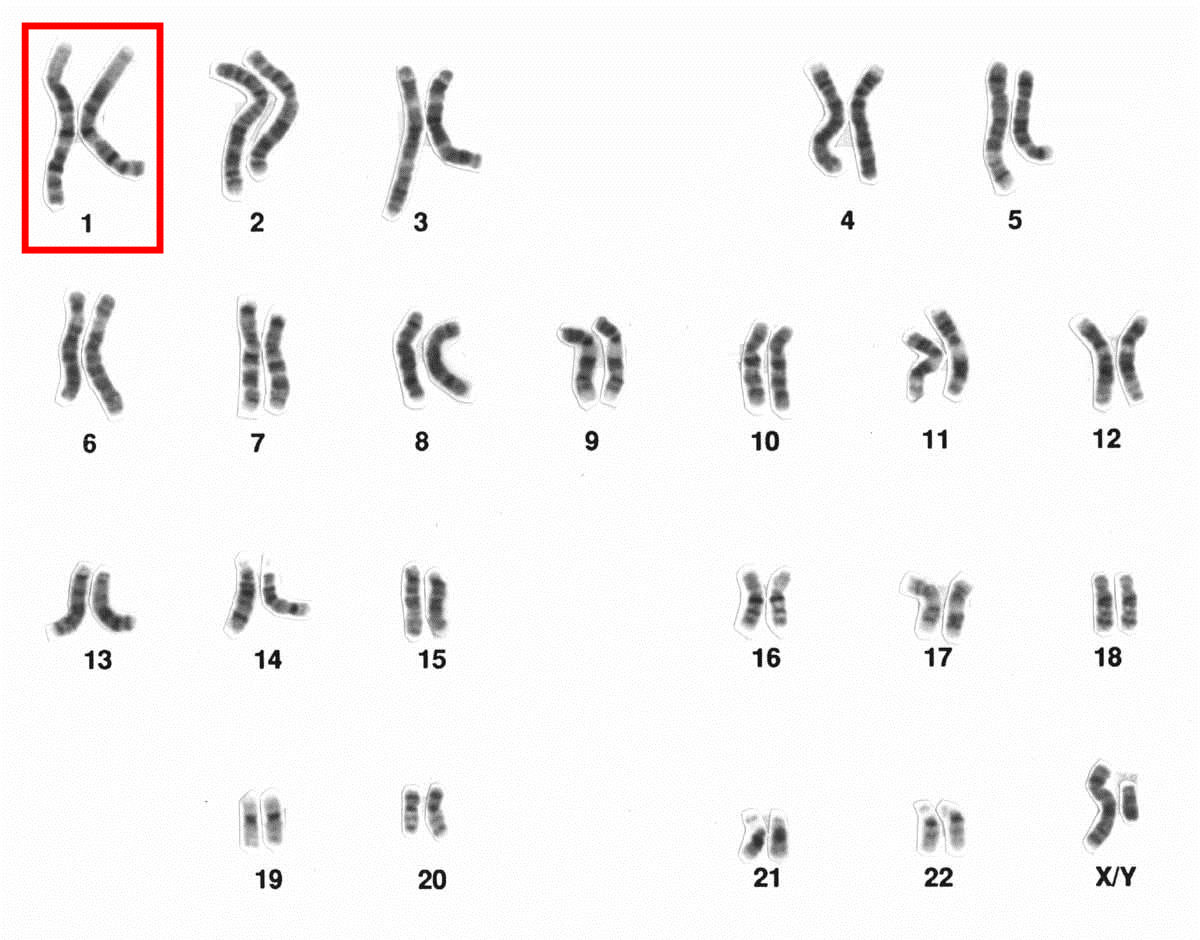
- Chromosome 1 pair in human male karyogram.

Features
- Length (bp): 248,387,328 bp (CHM13)
- No. of genes: 1,961 (CCDS)
- Type: Autosome
- Centromere position: Metacentric (123.4 Mbp)

Complete gene lists
- CCDS: Gene list
- HGNC: Gene list
- UniProt: Gene list
- NCBI: Gene list

External map viewers
- Ensembl: Chromosome 1
- Entrez: Chromosome 1
- NCBI: Chromosome 1
- UCSC: Chromosome 1

Full DNA sequences
- RefSeq: NC_000001 (FASTA)
- GenBank: CM000663 (FASTA)

Chromosome 1 is the designation for the largest human chromosome. Humans have two copies of chromosome 1, as they do with all of the autosomes, which are the non-sex chromosomes. Chromosome 1 spans about 249 million nucleotide base pairs, which are the basic units of information for DNA. It represents about 8% of the total DNA in human cells.

It was the last completed chromosome, sequenced two decades after the beginning of the Human Genome Project.

== Genes ==
=== Number of genes ===
The following are some of the gene count estimates of human chromosome 1. Because researchers' genome annotation approach varies, their predictions of the number of genes in each chromosome are different (for technical details, see gene prediction). Compared to various other projects, the Consensus Coding Sequence Project (CCDS) takes an extremely conservative strategy; as such, CCDS's gene number prediction represents a lower bound on the total number of human protein-coding genes.

Estimated by	Protein-coding genes	Non-coding RNA genes	Pseudogenes	Source	Release date
CCDS	1,961	—	—		2016-09-08
HGNC	1,993	707	1,113		2017-05-12
Ensembl	2,044	1,924	1,223		2017-03-29
UniProt	2,064	—	—		2018-02-28
NCBI	2,093	1,790	1,426		2017-05-19

=== Gene list ===
The following is a partial list of genes on human chromosome 1. For complete list, see the link in the infobox on the right.

- C1orf112: encoding protein Chromosome 1 open reading frame 112
- C1orf27: encoding protein Chromosome 1 open reading frame 27
- C1orf38: encoding protein Chromosome 1 open reading frame 38
- CCDC181: encoding protein Coiled-coil domain-containing protein 181
- CIROZ: Ciliated left-right organizer ZP-N domains-containing protein
- DENND1B: hypothesized to be related to asthma
- FHAD1: encoding protein Forkhead-associated domain containing protein 1
- LOC100132287: uncharacterized protein
- LRRIQ3: encoding protein Leucine-rich repeats and IQ motif containing 3
- Shisa family member 4: encoding protein Shisa family member 4
- TINAGL1: encoding protein Tubulointerstitial nephritis antigen-like

==== p-arm ====
Partial list of the genes located on p-arm (short arm) of human chromosome 1:

- AADACL3: Arylacetamide deacetylase-like 3
- AADACL4: Arylacetamide deacetylase-like 4
- ACADM: acyl-Coenzyme A dehydrogenase, C-4 to C-12 straight chain
- ACTG1P6: encoding protein Actin, gamma 1 pseudogene 6
- ACTL8: Actin-like 8
- ADGRL2 (1p31.1): adhesion G protein-coupled receptor L2
- ADPRHL2: Poly(ADP-ribose) glycohydrolase ARH3
- AMPD2: encoding enzyme AMP deaminase 2
- ARID1A (1p36)
- ATXN7L2: Ataxin 7-like 2
- AZIN2: encoding enzyme Antizyme inhibitor 2 (AzI2) also known as arginine decarboxylase (ADC)
- BCAS2: Breast carcinoma amplified sequence 2
- BCL10 (1p22)
- LRIF1: encoding protein Ligand-dependent nuclear receptor-interacting factor 1
- C1orf109: chromosome 1 open reading frame 109
- C1orf162: encoding protein Chromosome 1 open reading frame 162
- C1orf194: encoding protein Chromosome 1 open reading frame 194
- CZIB: chromosome 1 open reading frame 123
- CACHD1 encoding protein Cache domain containing 1
- CAMK2N1: encoding protein Calcium/calmodulin dependent protein kinase II inhibitor 1
- CAMTA1 (1p36)
- CASP9 (1p36)
- CASZ1 (1p36): Castor zinc finger 1
- CCDC17: encoding protein Coiled-coil domain containing 17
- CCDC18: encoding protein Coiled-coil domain containing 18
- CEP85: encoding protein Centrosomal protein 85
- CFAP74: encoding protein Cilia and flagella associated protein 74
- CHD5 (1p36)
- CLIC4 (1p36)
- CLSPN (1p34)
- CMPK: UMP-CMP kinase
- COL16A1 (1p35)
- COL11A1: collagen, type XI, alpha 1
- CPT2: carnitine palmitoyltransferase II
- CRYZ: Crystallin zeta
- CSDE1: Cold shock domain containing E1
- CYP4B1 (1p33)
- CYR61 (1p22)
- DBT: dihydrolipoamide branched chain transacylase E2
- DCLRE1B: DNA cross-link repair 1B
- DEPDC1 encoding protein DEP domain containing 1
- DIRAS3 (1p31): DIRAS family, GTP-binding RAS-like 3
- DISP3: encoding protein Dispatched rnd transporter family member 3
- DNASE2B: encoding protein Deoxyribonuclease 2 beta
- DPH5: Diphthine synthase
- DVL1 (1p36)
- ENO1 (1p36)
- EPHA2 (1p36)
- EPS15 (1p32)
- ESPN: espin (autosomal recessive deafness 36)
- EVI5: ecotropic viral integration site 5
- EXO5: encoding protein Exonuclease 5
- EXTL1: exostosin like glycosyltransferase 1
- EXTL2: exostosin like glycosyltransferase 2
- FAAH: Fatty-acid amide hydrolase 1
- FAM46B: family with sequence similarity 46, member B
- FAM46C: family with sequence similarity 46, member C
- FAM76A: family with sequence similarity 76, member A
- FAM87B: encoding protein Family with sequence similarity 87 member B
- FBXO2: F-box protein 2
- FNBP1L encoding protein Formin-binding protein 1-like
- FPGT: Fucose-1-phosphate guanylyltransferase
- FUBP1 (1p31)
- GALE: UDP-galactose-4-epimerase
- GADD45A (1p31)
- GBP1 (1p22)
- GBP2: guanylate binding protein 2
- GBP5 encoding protein Guanylate binding protein 5
- GBP6: encoding protein Guanylate binding protein family member 6
- GJB3: gap junction protein, beta 3, 31kDa (connexin 31)
- GLMN (1p22)
- GNL2: G protein nucleolar 2
- GSTM1 (1p13)
- GUCA2B: encoding protein Guanylate cyclase activator 2B
- HDAC1 (1p35)
- HES2: Hes family bHLH transcription factor 2
- HES3: Hes family bHLH transcription factor 3
- HMGCL: 3-hydroxymethyl-3-methylglutaryl-Coenzyme A lyase (hydroxymethylglutaricaciduria)
- HAO2 encoding protein Hydroxyacid oxidase 2
- HMGCS2: 3-hydroxy-3-methylglutaryl-CoA synthase 2
- HP1BP3: Heterochromatin protein 1, binding protein 3
- IFI6: Interferon alpha-inducible protein 6
- IL22RA1 (1p36)
- INTS11: Integrator complex subunit 11
- JAK1 (1p31)
- JUN (1p32)
- KANK4: encoding protein KN motif and ankyrin repeat domains 4
- KCNQ4: potassium voltage-gated channel, KQT-like subfamily, member 4
- KIF1B: kinesin family member 1B
- L1TD1: LINE-1 type transposase domain containing 1
- LCK (1p35)
- LINC01137: encoding protein Long intergenic non-protein coding RNA 1137
- LRRC39: Leucine-rich repeat-containing protein 39
- LRRC40: Leucine-rich repeat-containing protein 40
- LRRC41: Leucine-rich repeat-containing protein 41
- LRRC8D: Leucine-rich repeat-containing protein 8D
- MACO1: encoding protein Transmembrane protein 57
- MAN1A2: Mannosyl-oligosaccharide 1,2-alpha-mannosidase IB
- MAP3K6: encoding protein Mitogen-activated protein kinase kinase kinase 6
- MEAF6: MYST/ESA1 associated factor 6
- MECR: Trans-2-enoyl-CoA reductase, mitochondrial
- MFAP2: Microfibrillar-associated protein 2
- MIB2 (1p36)
- MIER1 (1p31)
- MIGA1: encoding protein Mitoguardin 1
- MFN2: mitofusin 2
- MFSD2: Major facilitator superfamily domain containing 2A
- MIR6079: microRNA 6079
- MMEL1: Membrane metallo-endopeptidase-like 1
- MTFR1L: mitochondrial fission regulator 1 like
- MTHFR (1p36): 5,10-methylenetetrahydrofolate reductase (NADPH)
- MUL1: Mitochondrial E3 ubiquitin protein ligase 1
- MUTYH (1p34): mutY homolog (E. coli)
- NBPF3: Neuroblastoma breakpoint family member 3
- NDUFA4P1: encoding protein Nadh dehydrogenase (ubiquinone) 1 alpha subcomplex, 4, 9kda, pseudogene 1
- NGF: Nerve Growth Factor
- NOL9: Nucleolar protein 9
- NRAS (1p13)
- NOTCH2 (1p12)
- OLFML3: Olfactomedin-like 3
- OMA1: Metalloendopeptidase OMA1, mitochondrial
- OVGP1: Oviductal glycoprotein 1
- PARK7 (1p36): Parkinson disease (autosomal recessive, early onset) 7
- PINK1: PTEN induced putative kinase 1
- PLOD1: procollagen-lysine 1, 2-oxoglutarate 5-dioxygenase 1
- PRAMEF10: encoding protein Prame family member 10
- PRMT6: Protein arginine methyltransferase 6
- PRXL2B: encoding protein Peroxiredoxin like 2B
- PSRC1: Proline/serine-rich coiled-coil protein 1
- RAD54L: RAD54-like
- RAP1A (1p13)
- RBM15 (1p13)
- RCC2: Regulator of chromosome condensation 2
- REG4 (1p12)
- RHBDL2: Rhomboid like 2
- RHOC (1p13)
- RIMS3: encoding protein Regulating synaptic membrane exocytosis 3
- RLF: rearranged L-myc fusion
- RNF11 (1p32)
- RNF19B: encoding protein Ring finger protein 19B
- RNF220: RING finger protein 220
- RPA2 (1p35)
- RSPO1 (1p34)
- S100A1 (1q21)
- SAMD11: encoding protein Sterile alpha motif domain containing 11
- SDC3: Syndecan-3
- SDHB (1p36)
- SFPQ (1p34): encoding protein Splicing factor proline and glutamine rich
- SGIP1: SH3 domain GRB2-like protein 3-interaction protein 1
- SH3BGRL3: SH3 domain-binding glutamic acid-rich-like protein 3
- SLC16A1 (1p13)
- SLC2A1 Glucose transporter 1
- SPSB1: SPRY domain-containing SOCS box protein 1
- STIL (1p33)
- SYCP1: Synaptonemal complex protein 1
- SZT2: Seizure threshold 2 homolog
- TACSTD2: tumor-associated calcium signal transducer 2
- TAL1 (1p33)
- TCTEX1D4: encoding protein Tctex1 domain containing 4
- TCEB3: Transcription elongation factor B polypeptide 3
- TGFBR3 (1p22)
- THRAP3 (1p34)
- TIE1 (1p34)
- TM2D1: encoding protein Tm2 domain containing 1
- TMCO2: encoding protein transmembrane and coiled-coil domains 2
- TMCO4: encoding protein transmembrane and coiled-coil domains 4
- TMEM48: encoding protein nucleoporin NDC1
- TMEM50A: Transmembrane protein 50A
- TMEM59: Transmembrane protein 59
- TMEM69: Transmembrane protein 69
- TMEM201 encoding protein Transmembrane protein 201
- TMEM222: Transmembrane protein 222
- TOE1: Target of EGR1 protein 1
- TRABD2B: encoding protein Trab domain containing 2b
- TRAPPC3: Trafficking protein particle complex subunit 3
- TRIT1: tRNA isopentenyltransferase, mitochondrial
- TSHB: thyroid stimulating hormone, beta
- TTC39A: Tetratricopeptide repeat 39A
- UBR4: E3 ubiquitin-protein ligase component n-recognin 4
- UROD: uroporphyrinogen decarboxylase (the gene for porphyria cutanea tarda)
- USP1 (1p31)
- USP48: Ubiquitin carboxyl-terminal hydrolase 48
- VAV3 (1p13)
- VPS13D: Vacuolar protein sorting-associated protein 13D
- VTCN1 (1p13)
- WARS2: Tryptophanyl-tRNA synthetase, mitochondrial
- WDR77 (1p13)
- YBX1 (1p34)
- ZCCHC17: zinc finger CCHC-type containing 17
- ZFP69: encoding protein Zfp69 zinc finger protein
- ZMYM1 encoding protein Zinc finger MYM-type containing 1
- ZNF436: Zinc finger protein 436
- ZNF684: encoding protein Zinc finger protein 684
- ZYG11B encoding protein Zyg-11 family member B, cell cycle regulator
- ZZZ3: ZZ-type zinc finger-containing protein 3

==== q-arm ====
Partial list of the genes located on q-arm (long arm) of human chromosome 1:

- ABL2 (1q25)
- ADIPOR1 (1q32)
- AHCTF1: encoding protein ELYS
- AKT3 (1q43-44)
- ANGPTL1: Angiopoietin-related protein 1
- ARHGEF2 (1q22)
- ARID4B: encoding protein AT-rich interactive domain-containing protein 4B
- ARV1 encoding protein ARV1 homolog (S. cerevisiae)
- ARNT (1q21)
- ASPM (1q31): a brain size determinant
- ATF3 (1q32)
- ATP2B4 (1q32)
- BCL9 (1q21)
- CATSPERE: encoding protein Catsper channel auxiliary subunit epsilon
- C1orf21: chromosome 1 open reading frame 21
- MMTAP2 encoding protein Multiple myeloma tumor-associated protein 2
- TEX35: TEX35
- C1orf74: chromosome 1 open reading frame 74
- C2CD4D: C2 calcium-dependent domain-containing 4D
- CTSS: Cathepsin S
- CD5L: CD5 molecule like
- CENPL: Centromere protein L
- CENPF (1q41)
- CHTOP: Chromatin target of prmt1
- CNIH4: cornichon homolog 4
- CNST: Consortin
- CREG1: Cellular repressor of E1A stimulated genes 1
- CRP: C-reactive protein
- CRTC2 (1q21)
- CSRP1: Cysteine and glycine rich protein 1
- DCAF8: encoding protein DDB1 and CUL4 associated factor 8
- DDX59: DEAD-box helicase 59
- DEL1Q21: encoding protein Chromosome 1q21.1 deletion syndrome
- DPT: Dermatopontin
- DISC2, long non-coding RNA
- DNAH14 encoding protein Dynein, axonemal, heavy chain 14
- DUSP10 (1q41)
- DUSP27: encoding protein Dual specificity phosphatase 27 (putative)
- DARS2 (1q25.1)
- ECM1 (1q21)
- EDEM3: ER degradation enhancing alpha-mannosidase like protein 3
- EGLN1 (1q42)
- ELF3: encoding protein E74 like ets transcription factor 3
- ENAH (1q42)
- ESRRG (1q41)
- FAM129A: family with sequence similarity 129, member A
- FAM163A: encoding protein neuroblastoma-derived secretory protein
- FAM20B: FAM20B, glycosaminoglycan xylosylkinase
- FAM63A: Family with sequence similarity 63, member A
- FAM78B: family with sequence similarity 78, member B
- FAM89A: encoding protein Fam89A
- FBXO28: F-box protein 28
- FCMR: Fc fragment of IgM receptor
- FCGR2B (1q23)
- FCGR2C: encoding protein Fc fragment of igg receptor iic (gene/pseudogene)
- FH (1q43): fumarase
- FLAD1: encoding protein Flavin adenine dinucleotide synthetase 1
- FLG-AS1: encoding protein FLG antisense RNA 1
- FMO3: flavin containing monooxygenase 3
- FRA1J encoding protein Fragile site, 5-azacytidine type, common, fra(1)(q12)
- G0S2: encoding G0/G1 switch 2
- GAS5 (1q25)
- GBA: glucosidase, beta; acid (includes glucosylceramidase) (gene for Gaucher disease)
- GBAP1: glucosylceramidase beta pseudogene 1
- GLC1A: gene for glaucoma
- GON4L: gon-4 like
- GPA33 (1q24)
- GPR37L1 G protein-coupled receptor 37 like 1
- H3C13: encoding protein Histone cluster 2 h3 family member d
- HEATR1: HEAT repeat-containing protein 1
- HFE2: hemochromatosis type 2 (juvenile)
- HIST2H2AB: Histone 2A type 2-B
- HIST2H2BF: Histone H2B type 2-F
- HIST2H3PS2: Histone cluster 2, H3, pseudogene 2
- HIST3H2A: Histone H2A type 3
- HIST3H2BB: Histone H2B type 3-B
- HRM2: Hair, curly
- IGSF8 (1q23)
- INAVA: Innate immunity activator protein
- INTS3: Integrator complex subunit 3
- IRF2BP2: encoding protein Interferon regulatory factor 2 binding protein 2
- IRF6: gene for connective tissue formation
- KCNH1 (1q32)
- KIF14 (1q32)
- LEFTY1: Left-right determination factor 1
- LHX9 encoding protein LIM homeobox 9
- LMNA: lamin A/C
- LMOD1: encoding protein Leiomodin 1
- LOC645166 encoding protein Lymphocyte-specific protein 1 pseudogene
- LYPLAL1: Lysophospholipase-like 1
- MAPKAPK2 (1q32)
- MIR194-1: microRNA 194-1
- MIR5008: microRNA 5008
- MPC2: Mitochondrial pyruvate carrier 2
- MOSC1: MOCO sulphurase C-terminal domain containing 1
- MOSC2: MOSC domain-containing protein 2, mitochondrial
- MPZ: myelin protein zero (Charcot–Marie–Tooth neuropathy 1B)
- MSTO1: misato 1
- MTR: 5-methyltetrahydrofolate-homocysteine methyltransferase
- NAV1: Neuron navigator 1
- NBPF16: Neuroblastoma breakpoint family, member 16
- NOC2L: Nucleolar complex protein 2 homolog
- NUCKS1: Nuclear ubiquitous casein and cyclin-dependent kinases substrate
- NVL: Nuclear valosin-containing protein-like
- OLFML2B: Olfactomedin-like 2B
- OPTC: Opticin
- OTUD7B: OTU domain-containing protein 7B
- PACERR encoding protein PTGS2 antisense NFKB1 complex-mediated expression regulator RNA
- PBX1 (1q23)
- PEA15 (1q23)
- PGDB5: PiggyBac transposable element derived 5
- PIAS3 (1q21)
- PI4KB: Phosphatidylinositol 4-kinase beta
- PIP5K1A (1q21): Phosphatidylinositol-4-phosphate 5-kinase type-1 alpha
- PLA2G4A (1q31)
- PPOX: protoporphyrinogen oxidase
- PRCC (1q23)
- PRR9 encoding protein Proline rich 9
- PSEN2 (1q42): presenilin 2 (Alzheimer disease 4)
- PTGS2 (1q31)
- PTPN14 (1q32-41)
- PTPN7 (1q32)
- RABIF: RAB interacting factor
- RASSF5 (1q32)
- RGS2 (1q31)
- RN5S1@: RNA, 5S ribosomal 1q42 cluster
- RPS27 (1q21)
- SCAMP3: Secretory carrier-associated membrane protein 3
- SDHC (1q23)
- SELE (1q24)
- SFT2D2: encoding protein Sft2 domain containing 2
- SHC1 (1q21)
- SHCBP1L: encoding protein Shc binding and spindle associated 1 like
- SLC30A10: encoding protein Solute carrier family 30 member 10
- SLC39A1 (1q21)
- SLC50A1: Solute carrier family 50 member 1
- SMCP: Sperm mitochondrial-associated cysteine-rich protein
- SMG7: nonsense mediated mRNA decay factor
- SMYD3 (1q44)
- SPG23
- SPRR1A: Cornifin-A
- SPRR1B: Cornifin-B
- SPRR2A: Small proline rich protein 2A
- SPRTN: Spartan
- TARBP1: TAR (HIV-1) RNA-binding protein 1
- TBCE: Tubulin-specific chaperone E
- THBS3: Thrombospondin 3
- TMCO1: Transmembrane and coiled-coil domain-containing protein 1
- TMEM9: Transmembrane protein 9
- TMEM63A: Transmembrane protein 63A
- TMEM81: Transmembrane protein 81
- TNFAIP8L2: encoding TNF alpha induced protein 8 like 2
- TNFSF18 (1q25)
- TNNT2: cardiac troponin T2
- TOR1AIP1: Torsin-1A-interacting protein 1
- TOR3A: encoding protein Torsin family 3 member A
- TP53BP2 (1q41)
- TRE-CTC1-5: Transfer RNA-Glu (CTC) 1-5
- UAP1: UDP-N-acetylhexosamine pyrophosphorylase
- USH2A: Usher syndrome 2A (autosomal recessive, mild)
- USF1 (1q23)
- VANGL2: encoding protein VANGL planar cell polarity protein 2
- VPS45: Vacuolar protein sorting-associated protein 45
- VPS72: Vacuolar protein sorting-associated protein 72
- YY1AP1: YY1-associated protein 1
- ZBED6: zinc finger, BED-type containing 6
- ZC3H11A: Zinc finger CCCH domain-containing protein 11A
- ZNF648 encoding protein Zinc finger protein 648
- ZNF669: Zinc finger protein 669
- ZNF687: Zinc finger protein 687
- ZNF692: Zinc finger protein 692
- ZNF695: Zinc finger protein 695

== Diseases and disorders ==
There are 890 known diseases related to this chromosome. Some of these diseases are hearing loss, Alzheimer's disease, glaucoma and breast cancer. Rearrangements and mutations of chromosome 1 are prevalent in cancer and many other diseases. Patterns of sequence variation reveal signals of recent selection in specific genes that may contribute to human fitness, and also in regions where no function is evident.

Complete monosomy (only having one copy of the entire chromosome) is invariably lethal before birth. Complete trisomy (having three copies of the entire chromosome) is lethal within days after conception. Some partial deletions and partial duplications produce birth defects.

The following diseases are some of those related to genes on chromosome 1 (which contains the most known genetic diseases of any human chromosome):

- 1q21.1 deletion syndrome
- 1q21.1 duplication syndrome
- Alzheimer's disease
- Autosomal dominant Charcot-Marie-Tooth disease type 2 with giant axons
- Bipolar disorder
- Breast cancer
- Brooke Greenberg Disease (Syndrome X)
- Carnitine palmitoyltransferase II deficiency
- Charcot–Marie–Tooth disease, types 1 and 2
- collagenopathy, types II and XI
- congenital hypothyroidism
- Ehlers–Danlos syndrome
- Factor V Leiden thrombophilia
- Familial adenomatous polyposis
- galactosemia
- Gaucher disease
- Gaucher-like disease
- Gelatinous drop-like corneal dystrophy
- Glaucoma
- GLUT1 deficiency syndrome
- Hearing loss, autosomal recessive deafness 36
- Hemochromatosis
- Hepatoerythropoietic porphyria
- Homocystinuria
- Hutchinson Gilford progeria syndrome
- 3-hydroxy-3-methylglutaryl-CoA lyase deficiency
- Hypertrophic cardiomyopathy, autosomal dominant mutations of TNNT2; hypertrophy usually mild; restrictive phenotype may be present; may carry high risk of sudden cardiac death
- maple syrup urine disease
- medium-chain acyl-coenzyme A dehydrogenase deficiency
- Microcephaly
- Mitochondrial enoyl-CoA reductase protein-associated neurodegeneration (MEPAN syndrome)
- Muckle–Wells syndrome
- Nonsyndromic deafness
- Oligodendroglioma
- Parkinson disease
- Pheochromocytoma
- porphyria
- porphyria cutanea tarda
- popliteal pterygium syndrome
- prostate cancer
- Skraban–Deardorff syndrome
- Stickler syndrome
- TAR syndrome
- trimethylaminuria
- Usher syndrome
- Usher syndrome type II
- Van der Woude syndrome
- Variegate porphyria
- GLYT1 Encephalopathy

== Cytogenetic band ==
G-banding ideograms of human chromosome 1

G-banding ideogram of human chromosome 1 in resolution 850 bphs. Band length in this diagram is proportional to base-pair length. This type of ideogram is generally used in genome browsers (e.g. Ensembl, UCSC Genome Browser).

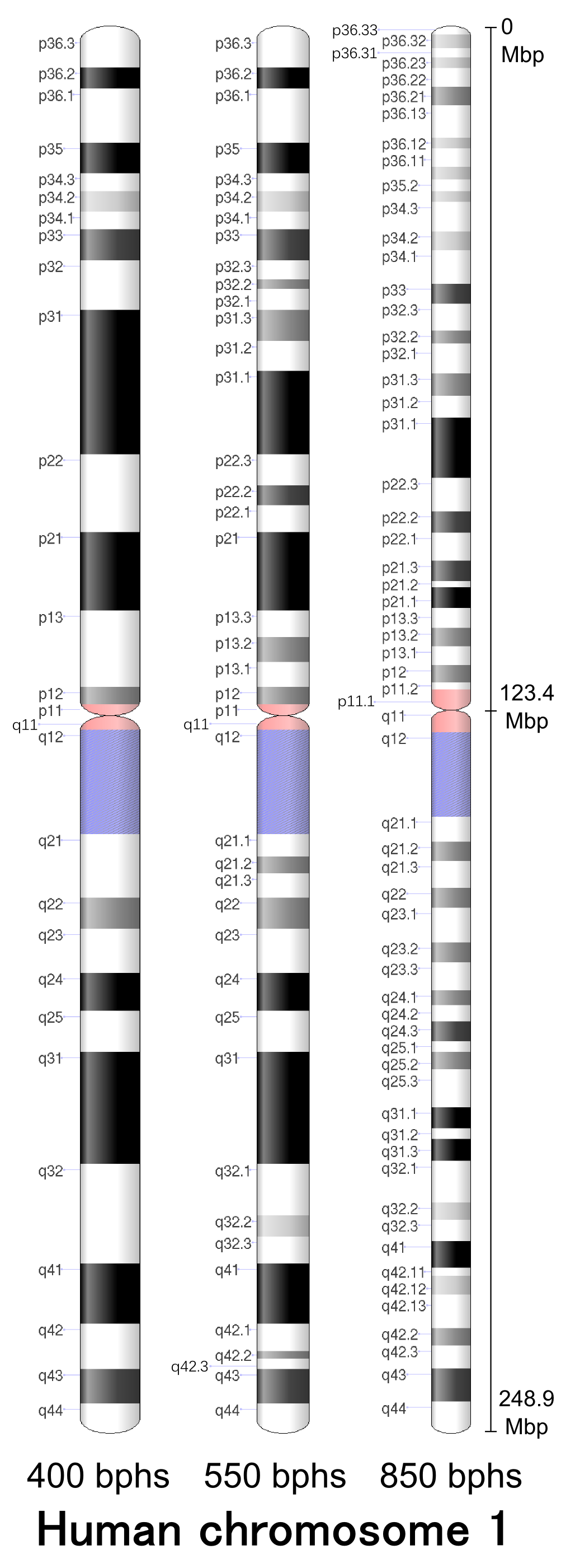
G-banding patterns of human chromosome 1 in three different resolutions (400, 550 and 850). Band length in this diagram is based on the ideograms from ISCN (2013). This type of ideogram represents actual relative band length observed under a microscope at the different moments during the mitotic process.

G-bands of human chromosome 1 in resolution 850 bphs
Chr.	Arm	Band	ISCN start	ISCN stop	Basepair start	Basepair stop	Stain	Density
1	p	36.33	0	100	1	2,300,000	gneg	
1	p	36.32	100	244	2,300,001	5,300,000	gpos	25
1	p	36.31	244	344	5,300,001	7,100,000	gneg	
1	p	36.23	344	459	7,100,001	9,100,000	gpos	25
1	p	36.22	459	660	9,100,001	12,500,000	gneg	
1	p	36.21	660	861	12,500,001	15,900,000	gpos	50
1	p	36.13	861	1206	15,900,001	20,100,000	gneg	
1	p	36.12	1206	1321	20,100,001	23,600,000	gpos	25
1	p	36.11	1321	1521	23,600,001	27,600,000	gneg	
1	p	35.3	1521	1651	27,600,001	29,900,000	gpos	25
1	p	35.2	1651	1780	29,900,001	32,300,000	gneg	
1	p	35.1	1780	1895	32,300,001	34,300,000	gpos	25
1	p	34.3	1895	2210	34,300,001	39,600,000	gneg	
1	p	34.2	2210	2411	39,600,001	43,700,000	gpos	25
1	p	34.1	2411	2770	43,700,001	46,300,000	gneg	
1	p	33	2770	2986	46,300,001	50,200,000	gpos	75
1	p	32.3	2986	3273	50,200,001	55,600,000	gneg	
1	p	32.2	3273	3416	55,600,001	58,500,000	gpos	50
1	p	32.1	3416	3732	58,500,001	60,800,000	gneg	
1	p	31.3	3732	3976	60,800,001	68,500,000	gpos	50
1	p	31.2	3976	4206	68,500,001	69,300,000	gneg	
1	p	31.1	4206	4852	69,300,001	84,400,000	gpos	100
1	p	22.3	4852	5210	84,400,001	87,900,000	gneg	
1	p	22.2	5210	5440	87,900,001	91,500,000	gpos	75
1	p	22.1	5440	5741	91,500,001	94,300,000	gneg	
1	p	21.3	5741	5957	94,300,001	99,300,000	gpos	75
1	p	21.2	5957	6029	99,300,001	101,800,000	gneg	
1	p	21.1	6029	6244	101,800,001	106,700,000	gpos	100
1	p	13.3	6244	6459	106,700,001	111,200,000	gneg	
1	p	13.2	6459	6660	111,200,001	115,500,000	gpos	50
1	p	13.1	6660	6861	115,500,001	117,200,000	gneg	
1	p	12	6861	7048	117,200,001	120,400,000	gpos	50
1	p	11.2	7048	7119	120,400,001	121,700,000	gneg	
1	p	11.1	7119	7335	121,700,001	123,400,000	acen	
1	q	11	7335	7579	123,400,001	125,100,000	acen	
1	q	12	7579	8483	125,100,001	143,200,000	gvar	
1	q	21.1	8483	8756	143,200,001	147,500,000	gneg	
1	q	21.2	8756	8957	147,500,001	150,600,000	gpos	50
1	q	21.3	8957	9244	150,600,001	155,100,000	gneg	
1	q	22	9244	9459	155,100,001	156,600,000	gpos	50
1	q	23.1	9459	9832	156,600,001	159,100,000	gneg	
1	q	23.2	9832	10048	159,100,001	160,500,000	gpos	50
1	q	23.3	10048	10349	160,500,001	165,500,000	gneg	
1	q	24.1	10349	10507	165,500,001	167,200,000	gpos	50
1	q	24.2	10507	10679	167,200,001	170,900,000	gneg	
1	q	24.3	10679	10894	170,900,001	173,000,000	gpos	75
1	q	25.1	10894	11009	173,000,001	176,100,000	gneg	
1	q	25.2	11009	11196	176,100,001	180,300,000	gpos	50
1	q	25.3	11196	11598	180,300,001	185,800,000	gneg	
1	q	31.1	11598	11827	185,800,001	190,800,000	gpos	100
1	q	31.2	11827	11942	190,800,001	193,800,000	gneg	
1	q	31.3	11942	12172	193,800,001	198,700,000	gpos	100
1	q	32.1	12172	12617	198,700,001	207,100,000	gneg	
1	q	32.2	12617	12803	207,100,001	211,300,000	gpos	25
1	q	32.3	12803	13033	211,300,001	214,400,000	gneg	
1	q	41	13033	13320	214,400,001	223,900,000	gpos	100
1	q	42.11	13320	13406	223,900,001	224,400,000	gneg	
1	q	42.12	13406	13607	224,400,001	226,800,000	gpos	25
1	q	42.13	13607	13966	226,800,001	230,500,000	gneg	
1	q	42.2	13966	14153	230,500,001	234,600,000	gpos	50
1	q	42.3	14153	14397	234,600,001	236,400,000	gneg	
1	q	43	14397	14756	236,400,001	243,500,000	gpos	75
1	q	44	14756	15100	243,500,001	248,956,422	gneg	
