= CNIH4 =

Protein-coding gene in humans

Identifiers
- Aliases: CNIH4, CNIH-4, HSPC163, cornichon family AMPA receptor auxiliary protein 4, CNIH2
- External IDs: OMIM: 617483; MGI: 1925828; GeneCards: CNIH4

Gene location (Human)
| Chr. | Chromosome 1 (human) |
| Band | 1q42.11 | Start | 224,356,858 bp |
| Band | 1q42.11 | End | 224,379,459 bp |

Gene location (Mouse)
| Chr. | Chromosome 1 (mouse) |
| Band | 1|1 H4 | Start | 180,972,258 bp |
| Band | 1|1 H4 | End | 180,996,559 bp |
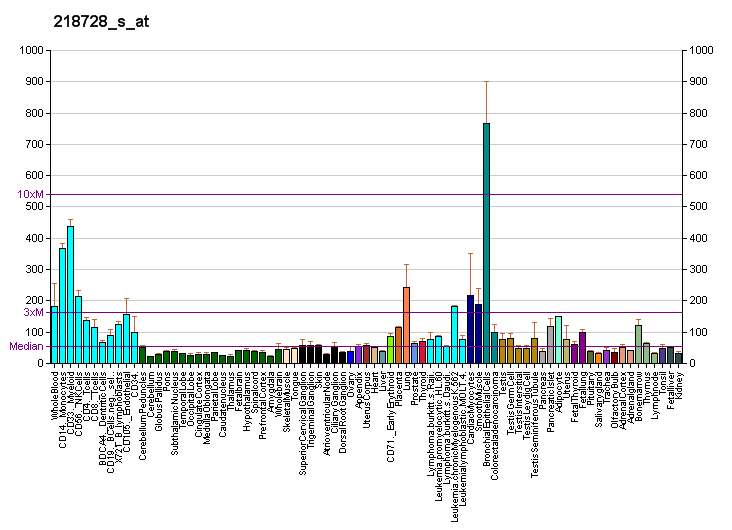
RNA expression pattern
| Bgee | Human / Mouse (ortholog); Top expressed in: jejunal mucosa; vulva; pericardium; right ventricle; human penis; oral cavity; cartilage tissue; mucosa of pharynx; biceps brachii; gums / Top expressed in: endothelial cell of lymphatic vessel; right kidney; internal carotid artery; medial ganglionic eminence; duodenum; morula; jejunum; hair follicle; external carotid artery; epithelium of stomach; More reference expression data |
| BioGPS | More reference expression data |
Gene ontology
| Molecular function | protein binding; CCR5 chemokine receptor binding |
| Cellular component | integral component of membrane; endoplasmic reticulum; membrane; endoplasmic reticulum-Golgi intermediate compartment |
| Biological process | protein transport; endoplasmic reticulum to Golgi vesicle-mediated transport; vesicle-mediated transport |
Sources:Amigo / QuickGO
Orthologs
| Databases | NCBI: entry; OMA: entry |
| Species | Human | Mouse |
| Entrez | 29097 | 98417 |
| Ensembl | ENSG00000143771 | ENSMUSG00000062169 |
| UniProt | Q9P003 | Q9CX13 |
| RefSeq (mRNA) | NM_001277197; NM_001277198; NM_001277199; NM_001277200; NM_014184 | NM_030131 |
| RefSeq (protein) | NP_001264126; NP_001264127; NP_001264128; NP_001264129; NP_054903 | NP_084407 |
| Location (UCSC) | Chr 1: 224.36 – 224.38 Mb | Chr 1: 180.97 – 181 Mb |
| PubMed search |
- Wikidata
| View/Edit Human | View/Edit Mouse |

Protein cornichon homolog 4 is a protein that in humans is encoded by the CNIH4 gene.
