= TMCO2 =

Protein-coding gene in humans

Identifiers
- Aliases: TMCO2, dJ39G22.2, transmembrane and coiled-coil domains 2
- External IDs: MGI: 1916719; GeneCards: TMCO2

Gene location (Human)
Chr.	Chromosome 1 (human)
Band	1p34.2	Start	40,245,947 bp
Band	1p34.2	End	40,251,684 bp

Gene location (Mouse)
Chr.	Chromosome 4 (mouse)
Band	4|4 D2.2	Start	120,962,848 bp
Band	4|4 D2.2	End	120,966,423 bp
RNA expression pattern
Bgee	Human / Mouse (ortholog); Top expressed in: sperm; left testis; right testis; testicle; tibialis anterior muscle; deltoid muscle; granulocyte; cerebellar hemisphere; right coronary artery; right hemisphere of cerebellum / Top expressed in: seminiferous tubule; spermatid; spermatocyte; gastrula; morula; blastocyst; submandibular gland; lumbar subsegment of spinal cord; granulocyte; digastric muscle; More reference expression data
BioGPS	n/a
Orthologs
Databases	NCBI: entry; OMA: entry
Species	Human	Mouse
Entrez	127391	69469
Ensembl	ENSG00000188800	ENSMUSG00000078577
UniProt	Q7Z6W1	P0C1V4
RefSeq (mRNA)	NM_001008740	NM_001081312
RefSeq (protein)	NP_001008740	n/a
Location (UCSC)	Chr 1: 40.25 – 40.25 Mb	Chr 4: 120.96 – 120.97 Mb
PubMed search
- Wikidata
View/Edit Human	View/Edit Mouse

Transmembrane and coiled-coil domains 2 is a protein that in humans is encoded by the TMCO2 gene.
