= CASZ1 =

Protein-coding gene in humans

Identifiers
- Aliases: CASZ1, CAS11, CST, SRG, ZNF693, dJ734G22.1, castor zinc finger 1
- External IDs: OMIM: 609895; MGI: 1196251; GeneCards: CASZ1

Gene location (Human)
Chr.	Chromosome 1 (human)
Band	1p36.22	Start	10,636,604 bp
Band	1p36.22	End	10,796,650 bp

Gene location (Mouse)
Chr.	Chromosome 4 (mouse)
Band	4 E2|4 78.87 cM	Start	148,888,886 bp
Band	4 E2|4 78.87 cM	End	149,039,346 bp
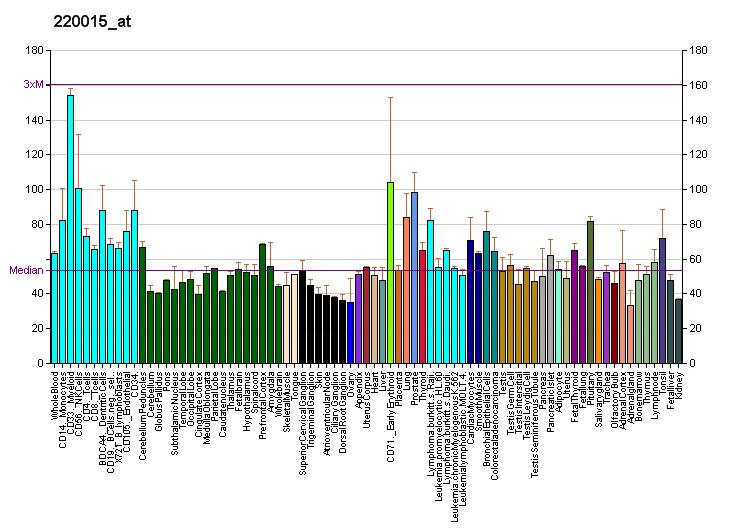
RNA expression pattern
Bgee	Human / Mouse (ortholog); Top expressed in: skin of leg; skin of abdomen; muscle of thigh; pancreatic ductal cell; buccal mucosa cell; gastrocnemius muscle; bronchial epithelial cell; skin of arm; muscle layer of sigmoid colon; body of stomach / Top expressed in: lip; neural layer of retina; muscle of thigh; gastrula; lumbar spinal ganglion; esophagus; interventricular septum; internal carotid artery; hair follicle; prostate; More reference expression data
BioGPS	More reference expression data
Gene ontology
Molecular function	metal ion binding; DNA binding; nucleic acid binding; DNA-binding transcription factor activity, RNA polymerase II-specific
Cellular component	intracellular membrane-bounded organelle; nucleoplasm; cytosol; nucleus
Biological process	multicellular organism development; regulation of transcription, DNA-templated; regulation of neuron differentiation; positive regulation of transcription, DNA-templated; transcription, DNA-templated; regulation of transcription by RNA polymerase II
Sources:Amigo / QuickGO
Orthologs
Databases	NCBI: entry; OMA: entry
Species	Human	Mouse
Entrez	54897	69743
Ensembl	ENSG00000130940	ENSMUSG00000028977
UniProt	Q86V15	Q9CWL2
RefSeq (mRNA)	NM_001039183; NM_001079843; NM_017766	NM_001159344; NM_027195
RefSeq (protein)	NP_001073312; NP_060236	NP_001152816; NP_081471
Location (UCSC)	Chr 1: 10.64 – 10.8 Mb	Chr 4: 148.89 – 149.04 Mb
PubMed search
- Wikidata
View/Edit Human	View/Edit Mouse

Putative survival-related protein is a protein that in humans is encoded by the CASZ1 gene.
