= VPS72 =

Protein-coding gene in humans

Identifiers
- Aliases: VPS72, CFL1, Swc2, TCFL1, YL-1, YL1, vacuolar protein sorting 72 homolog
- External IDs: OMIM: 600607; MGI: 1202305; GeneCards: VPS72
Available structures
PDB	Ortholog search: PDBe RCSB
PDB	List of PDB id codes 5FUG

Gene location (Human)
Chr.	Chromosome 1 (human)
Band	1q21.3	Start	151,176,304 bp
Band	1q21.3	End	151,195,321 bp

Gene location (Mouse)
Chr.	Chromosome 3 (mouse)
Band	3|3 F2.1	Start	95,018,333 bp
Band	3|3 F2.1	End	95,030,362 bp
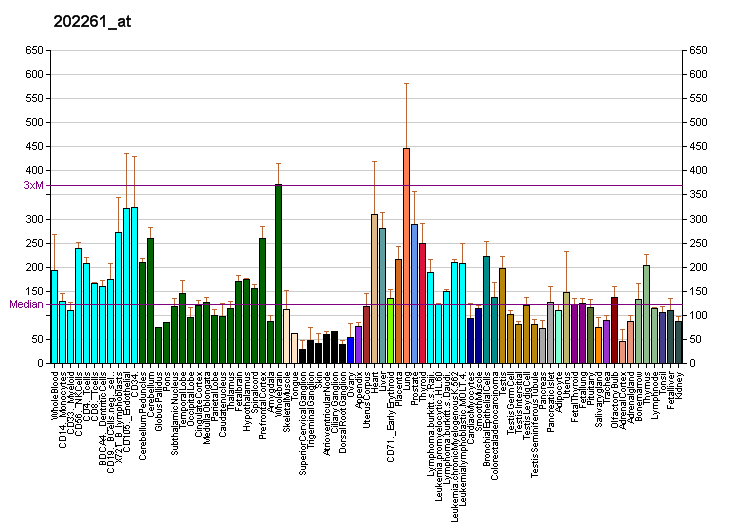
RNA expression pattern
Bgee	Human / Mouse (ortholog); Top expressed in: secondary oocyte; ganglionic eminence; ventricular zone; Achilles tendon; gastrocnemius muscle; islet of Langerhans; muscle of thigh; smooth muscle tissue; stromal cell of endometrium; prefrontal cortex / Top expressed in: ventricular zone; muscle of thigh; medial ganglionic eminence; neural tube; zygote; lip; internal carotid artery; external carotid artery; neural layer of retina; embryo; More reference expression data
BioGPS	More reference expression data
Gene ontology
Molecular function	DNA binding; protein binding; histone binding
Cellular component	nucleus; nucleoplasm; nuclear speck; protein-containing complex
Biological process	chromatin remodeling; regulation of transcription, DNA-templated; negative regulation of transcription by RNA polymerase II; somatic stem cell population maintenance; transcription, DNA-templated; histone exchange; chromatin organization
Sources:Amigo / QuickGO
Orthologs
Databases	NCBI: entry; OMA: entry
Species	Human	Mouse
Entrez	6944	21427
Ensembl	ENSG00000163159	ENSMUSG00000008958
UniProt	Q15906	Q62481
RefSeq (mRNA)	NM_005997; NM_001271087; NM_001271088	NM_009336
RefSeq (protein)	NP_001258016; NP_001258017; NP_005988	NP_033362
Location (UCSC)	Chr 1: 151.18 – 151.2 Mb	Chr 3: 95.02 – 95.03 Mb
PubMed search
- Wikidata
View/Edit Human	View/Edit Mouse

Vacuolar protein sorting-associated protein 72 homolog is a protein that in humans is encoded by the VPS72 gene.
