= Sterile alpha motif domain containing 11 =

Protein found in humans

SAMD11

Identifiers
- Aliases: SAMD11, MRS, sterile alpha motif domain containing 11
- External IDs: OMIM: 616765; MGI: 2446220; GeneCards: SAMD11

Gene location (Human)
Chr.	Chromosome 1 (human)
Band	1p36.33	Start	923,923 bp
Band	1p36.33	End	944,575 bp

Gene location (Mouse)
Chr.	Chromosome 4 (mouse)
Band	4|4 E2	Start	156,246,966 bp
Band	4|4 E2	End	156,255,657 bp
RNA expression pattern
Bgee	Human / Mouse (ortholog); Top expressed in: left uterine tube; pituitary gland; anterior pituitary; right auricle of heart; spleen; gonad; canal of the cervix; prostate; Descending thoracic aorta; body of uterus / Top expressed in: neural layer of retina; retinal pigment epithelium; fetal liver hematopoietic progenitor cell; photoreceptor layer of retina; pineal gland; blood; epithelium of lens; ascending aorta; aortic valve; supraoptic nucleus; More reference expression data
BioGPS	n/a
Orthologs
Databases	NCBI: entry; OMA: entry
Species	Human	Mouse
Entrez	148398	231004
Ensembl	ENSG00000187634	ENSMUSG00000096351
UniProt	Q96NU1	Q1RNF8
RefSeq (mRNA)	NM_152486; NM_001385640; NM_001385641	NM_001110516; NM_173736; NM_001355709
RefSeq (protein)	NP_689699	NP_001103986; NP_001342638
Location (UCSC)	Chr 1: 0.92 – 0.94 Mb	Chr 4: 156.25 – 156.26 Mb
PubMed search
- Wikidata
View/Edit Human	View/Edit Mouse

Sterile alpha motif domain containing 11 is a protein that is encoded by the SAMD11 gene in humans.
