= FAM20B =

Protein-coding gene in humans

Identifiers
- Aliases: FAM20B, gxk1, family with sequence similarity 20 member B, glycosaminoglycan xylosylkinase, FAM20B glycosaminoglycan xylosylkinase
- External IDs: OMIM: 611063; MGI: 2443990; GeneCards: FAM20B

Gene location (Human)
Chr.	Chromosome 1 (human)
Band	1q25.2	Start	179,025,804 bp
Band	1q25.2	End	179,076,567 bp

Gene location (Mouse)
Chr.	Chromosome 1 (mouse)
Band	1|1 G3	Start	156,506,102 bp
Band	1|1 G3	End	156,546,656 bp
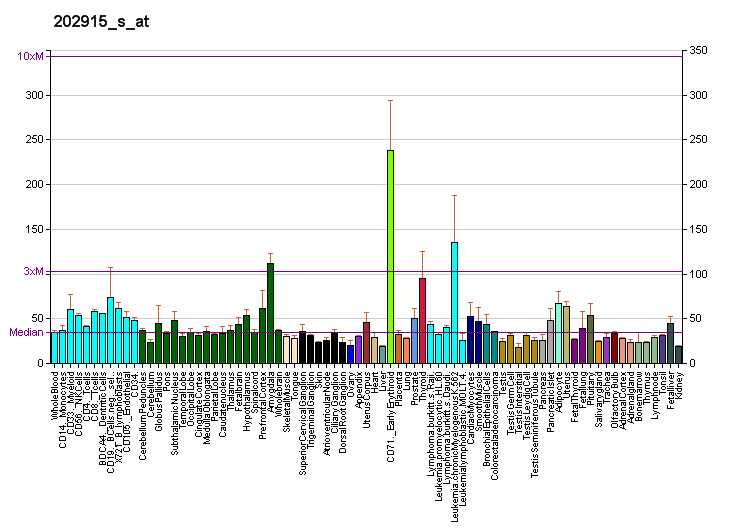

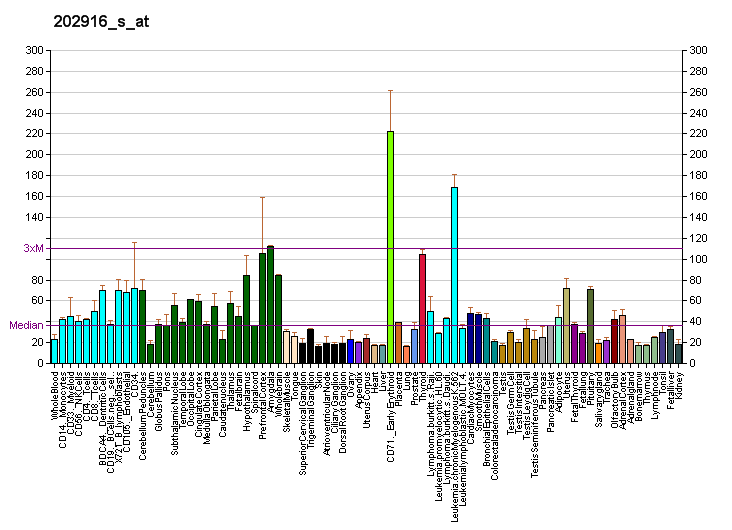
RNA expression pattern
Bgee	Human / Mouse (ortholog); Top expressed in: lateral nuclear group of thalamus; Brodmann area 10; saphenous vein; external globus pallidus; pars compacta; pars reticulata; frontal pole; spinal ganglia; tail of epididymis; trigeminal ganglion / Top expressed in: Paneth cell; ciliary body; retinal pigment epithelium; transitional epithelium of urinary bladder; saccule; ileum; crypt of lieberkuhn of small intestine; central gray substance of midbrain; left colon; ectoderm; More reference expression data
BioGPS	More reference expression data
Gene ontology
Molecular function	transferase activity; nucleotide binding; ATP binding; metal ion binding; phosphotransferase activity, alcohol group as acceptor; kinase activity; protein binding
Cellular component	integral component of membrane; Golgi membrane; Golgi apparatus; membrane; nucleoplasm
Biological process	phosphorylation; protein phosphorylation; proteoglycan biosynthetic process
Sources:Amigo / QuickGO
Orthologs
Databases	NCBI: entry; OMA: entry
Species	Human	Mouse
Entrez	9917	215015
Ensembl	ENSG00000116199	ENSMUSG00000033557
UniProt	O75063	Q8VCS3
RefSeq (mRNA)	NM_014864; NM_001324310; NM_001324311	NM_145413
RefSeq (protein)	NP_001311239; NP_001311240; NP_055679	NP_663388
Location (UCSC)	Chr 1: 179.03 – 179.08 Mb	Chr 1: 156.51 – 156.55 Mb
PubMed search
- Wikidata
View/Edit Human	View/Edit Mouse

Protein FAM20B is a protein that in humans is encoded by the FAM20B gene.
