= Cilia and flagella associated protein 74 =

Protein found in humans

CFAP74

Identifiers
- Aliases: CFAP74, C1orf222, KIAA1751, cilia and flagella associated protein 74
- External IDs: MGI: 1917130; GeneCards: CFAP74

Gene location (Human)
Chr.	Chromosome 1 (human)
Band	1p36.33	Start	1,921,951 bp
Band	1p36.33	End	2,003,837 bp

Gene location (Mouse)
Chr.	Chromosome 4 (mouse)
Band	4|4 E2	Start	155,409,190 bp
Band	4|4 E2	End	155,466,823 bp
RNA expression pattern
Bgee	Human / Mouse (ortholog); Top expressed in: right uterine tube; epithelium of bronchus; bronchial epithelial cell; olfactory zone of nasal mucosa; right hemisphere of cerebellum; right testis; left testis; testicle; buccal mucosa cell; gonad / Top expressed in: spermatocyte; testicle; spermatid; thymus; hypothalamus; cerebellar cortex; superior frontal gyrus; primary visual cortex; neural layer of retina; embryo; More reference expression data
BioGPS	n/a
Orthologs
Databases	NCBI: entry; OMA: entry
Species	Human	Mouse
Entrez	85452	544678
Ensembl	ENSG00000142609	ENSMUSG00000078490
UniProt	Q9C0B2	Q3UY96
RefSeq (mRNA)	NM_001003808; NM_001080484; NM_001304360	NM_001166029; NM_177674; NM_001368738
RefSeq (protein)	NP_001291289	NP_001159501; NP_808342; NP_001355667
Location (UCSC)	Chr 1: 1.92 – 2 Mb	Chr 4: 155.41 – 155.47 Mb
PubMed search
- Wikidata
View/Edit Human	View/Edit Mouse

Cilia and flagella associated protein 74 is a protein that in humans is encoded by the CFAP74 gene.
