= GNL2 =

Protein-coding gene in humans

Identifiers
- Aliases: GNL2, HUMAUANTIG, NGP1, Ngp-1, Nog2, Nug2, G protein nucleolar 2
- External IDs: OMIM: 609365; MGI: 2385207; GeneCards: GNL2

Gene location (Human)
Chr.	Chromosome 1 (human)
Band	1p34.3	Start	37,566,816 bp
Band	1p34.3	End	37,595,937 bp

Gene location (Mouse)
Chr.	Chromosome 4 (mouse)
Band	4|4 D2.2	Start	124,910,378 bp
Band	4|4 D2.2	End	124,949,173 bp
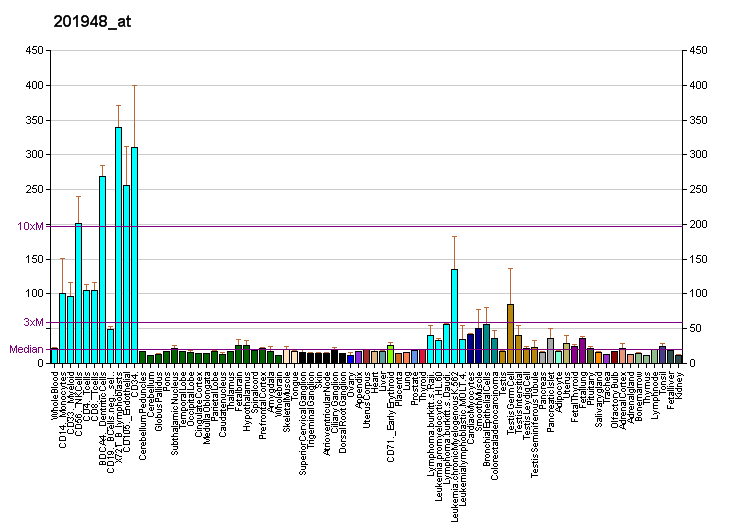
RNA expression pattern
Bgee	Human / Mouse (ortholog); Top expressed in: tendon of biceps brachii; gingival epithelium; sural nerve; Achilles tendon; gonad; amniotic fluid; olfactory zone of nasal mucosa; gastrocnemius muscle; epithelium of nasopharynx; anterior pituitary / Top expressed in: condyle; fossa; saccule; otic placode; internal carotid artery; external carotid artery; supraoptic nucleus; lens; spermatocyte; primary oocyte; More reference expression data
BioGPS	More reference expression data
Gene ontology
Molecular function	nucleotide binding; GTP binding; RNA binding; GTPase activity
Cellular component	membrane; nucleus; nucleolus; integral component of membrane
Biological process	ribosome biogenesis; biological process
Sources:Amigo / QuickGO
Orthologs
Databases	NCBI: entry; OMA: entry
Species	Human	Mouse
Entrez	29889	230737
Ensembl	ENSG00000134697	ENSMUSG00000028869
UniProt	Q13823	Q99LH1
RefSeq (mRNA)	NM_013285; NM_001323623; NM_001323624	NM_145552
RefSeq (protein)	NP_001310552; NP_001310553; NP_037417	NP_663527
Location (UCSC)	Chr 1: 37.57 – 37.6 Mb	Chr 4: 124.91 – 124.95 Mb
PubMed search
- Wikidata
View/Edit Human	View/Edit Mouse

Nucleolar GTP-binding protein 2 is a protein that in humans is encoded by the GNL2 gene.
