= ACTL8 =

Protein-coding gene in humans

Identifiers
- Aliases: ACTL8, CT57, actin like 8
- External IDs: GeneCards: ACTL8

Gene location (Human)
Chr.	Chromosome 1 (human)
Band	1p36.13	Start	17,755,333 bp
Band	1p36.13	End	17,827,063 bp
RNA expression pattern
Bgee	Human / Mouse (ortholog); Top expressed in: oocyte; secondary oocyte; testicle; gonad; right testis; left testis; mucosa of transverse colon; rectum; frontal lobe; Cortex of frontal lobe / n/a; More reference expression data
BioGPS	n/a
Gene ontology
Molecular function	protein binding; cytoskeletal protein-membrane anchor activity
Cellular component	cytoplasm; cytoskeleton; centrosome; dynactin complex; cell cortex region
Biological process	epithelial cell differentiation; establishment of mitotic spindle orientation; nuclear migration along microtubule
Sources:Amigo / QuickGO
Orthologs
Databases	NCBI: entry; OMA: entry
Species	Human	Mouse
Entrez	81569	n/a
Ensembl	ENSG00000117148	n/a
UniProt	Q9H568	n/a
RefSeq (mRNA)	NM_030812	n/a
RefSeq (protein)	NP_110439	n/a
Location (UCSC)	Chr 1: 17.76 – 17.83 Mb	n/a
PubMed search		n/a
- Wikidata
View/Edit Human

Actin-like 8 is a protein in humans that is encoded by the ACTL8 gene. It is a protein that is used in making the intracellular architecture of cells. ACTL8 expression is significantly upregulated in gastric cancer cells and is strongly associated with negative patient outcomes.
