= Centrosomal protein 85 =

Protein found in humans

CEP85

Identifiers
- Aliases: CEP85, CCDC21, centrosomal protein 85
- External IDs: MGI: 1917262; GeneCards: CEP85

Gene location (Human)
| Chr. | Chromosome 1 (human) |
| Band | 1p36.11 | Start | 26,234,200 bp |
| Band | 1p36.11 | End | 26,278,808 bp |

Gene location (Mouse)
| Chr. | Chromosome 4 (mouse) |
| Band | 4|4 D3 | Start | 134,129,858 bp |
| Band | 4|4 D3 | End | 134,187,112 bp |
RNA expression pattern
| Bgee | Human / Mouse (ortholog); Top expressed in: oocyte; secondary oocyte; Skeletal muscle tissue of rectus abdominis; muscle of thigh; thoracic diaphragm; gastrocnemius muscle; apex of heart; vastus lateralis muscle; gonad; muscle of arm / Top expressed in: right kidney; spermatocyte; muscle of thigh; thymus; neural layer of retina; yolk sac; proximal tubule; otic vesicle; zygote; spermatid; More reference expression data |
| BioGPS | n/a |
Gene ontology
| Molecular function | protein binding |
| Cellular component | centrosome; Golgi apparatus; spindle pole; pericentriolar material; nucleolus; cytoskeleton; nucleus; cytoplasm; cytosol; mitochondrion; microtubule organizing center |
| Biological process | regulation of mitotic centrosome separation; negative regulation of protein kinase activity; chromosome segregation |
Sources:Amigo / QuickGO
Orthologs
| Databases | NCBI: entry; OMA: entry |
| Species | Human | Mouse |
| Entrez | 64793 | 70012 |
| Ensembl | ENSG00000130695 | ENSMUSG00000037443 |
| UniProt | Q6P2H3 | Q8BMK0 |
| RefSeq (mRNA) | NM_001281517; NM_001281518; NM_022778; NM_001319944 | NM_144527 |
| RefSeq (protein) | NP_001268446; NP_001268447; NP_001306873; NP_073615 | NP_653110 |
| Location (UCSC) | Chr 1: 26.23 – 26.28 Mb | Chr 4: 134.13 – 134.19 Mb |
| PubMed search |
- Wikidata
| View/Edit Human | View/Edit Mouse |

Centrosomal protein 85 is a protein that in humans is encoded by the CEP85 gene.

== Function ==
This gene encodes a protein that belongs to the centrosome-associated family of proteins. The centrosome is a subcellular organelle in the animal cell that functions as a microtubule organizing center and is involved in cell-cycle progression. Alternate splicing results in multiple transcript variants. [provided by RefSeq, Jul 2013].
