= Transmembrane protein 201 =

Protein found in humans

TMEM201

Identifiers
- Aliases: TMEM201, NET5, transmembrane protein 201, Ima1, SAMP1
- External IDs: MGI: 1196277; GeneCards: TMEM201

Gene location (Human)
Chr.	Chromosome 1 (human)
Band	1p36.22	Start	9,588,911 bp
Band	1p36.22	End	9,614,877 bp

Gene location (Mouse)
Chr.	Chromosome 4 (mouse)
Band	4 E2|4 80.15 cM	Start	149,799,832 bp
Band	4 E2|4 80.15 cM	End	149,822,501 bp
RNA expression pattern
Bgee	Human / Mouse (ortholog); Top expressed in: cardiac muscle tissue of right atrium; myocardium of left ventricle; quadriceps femoris muscle; vastus lateralis muscle; gastrocnemius muscle; deltoid muscle; Skeletal muscle tissue of biceps brachii; Skeletal muscle tissue of rectus abdominis; muscle of thigh; body of tongue / Top expressed in: secondary oocyte; primary oocyte; zygote; cerebellar cortex; muscle of thigh; neural layer of retina; superior frontal gyrus; primary visual cortex; tail of embryo; skeletal muscle tissue; More reference expression data
BioGPS	n/a
Gene ontology
Molecular function	protein binding; lamin binding; actin filament binding
Cellular component	integral component of membrane; nuclear inner membrane; membrane; nucleus; spindle pole; cytoplasm; cytoskeleton; nuclear membrane; nuclear envelope; spindle pole centrosome; cortical endoplasmic reticulum; integral component of nuclear inner membrane
Biological process	fibroblast migration; nuclear migration; nuclear envelope organization; centrosome localization; protein localization to nuclear envelope; nuclear migration along microtubule
Sources:Amigo / QuickGO
Orthologs
Databases	NCBI: entry; OMA: entry
Species	Human	Mouse
Entrez	199953	230917
Ensembl	ENSG00000188807	ENSMUSG00000044700
UniProt	Q5SNT2	A2A8U2
RefSeq (mRNA)	NM_001010866; NM_001130924	NM_001025106; NM_001284270; NM_001284273; NM_177672
RefSeq (protein)	NP_001010866; NP_001124396	NP_001271199; NP_001271202; NP_808340
Location (UCSC)	Chr 1: 9.59 – 9.61 Mb	Chr 4: 149.8 – 149.82 Mb
PubMed search
- Wikidata
View/Edit Human	View/Edit Mouse

Transmembrane protein 201 is a protein that in humans is encoded by the TMEM201 gene.
