= Shisa family member 4 =

Protein found in humans

SHISA4

Identifiers
- Aliases: SHISA4, C1orf40, TMEM58, shisa family member 4
- External IDs: OMIM: 617326; MGI: 1924802; GeneCards: SHISA4

Gene location (Human)
Chr.	Chromosome 1 (human)
Band	1q32.1	Start	201,888,680 bp
Band	1q32.1	End	201,892,587 bp

Gene location (Mouse)
Chr.	Chromosome 1 (mouse)
Band	1|1 E4	Start	135,298,795 bp
Band	1|1 E4	End	135,302,975 bp
RNA expression pattern
Bgee	Human / Mouse (ortholog); Top expressed in: temporal lobe; amygdala; muscle of thigh; substantia nigra; prefrontal cortex; putamen; gastrocnemius muscle; hippocampus proper; caudate nucleus; nucleus accumbens / Top expressed in: triceps brachii muscle; ankle; temporal muscle; seminal vesicula; piriform cortex; muscle of thigh; vastus lateralis muscle; medial head of gastrocnemius muscle; pontine nuclei; skeletal muscle tissue; More reference expression data
BioGPS	n/a
Orthologs
Databases	NCBI: entry; OMA: entry
Species	Human	Mouse
Entrez	149345	77552
Ensembl	ENSG00000198892	ENSMUSG00000041889
UniProt	Q96DD7	Q8CA71
RefSeq (mRNA)	NM_198149	NM_175259
RefSeq (protein)	NP_937792	NP_780468
Location (UCSC)	Chr 1: 201.89 – 201.89 Mb	Chr 1: 135.3 – 135.3 Mb
PubMed search
- Wikidata
View/Edit Human	View/Edit Mouse

Shisa family member 4 is a protein that in humans is encoded by the SHISA4 gene.
