= ZNF669 =

Protein-coding gene in humans

Identifiers
- Aliases: ZNF669, zinc finger protein 669
- External IDs: MGI: 4867078; GeneCards: ZNF669

Gene location (Human)
Chr.	Chromosome 1 (human)
Band	1q44	Start	247,099,962 bp
Band	1q44	End	247,104,372 bp

Gene location (Mouse)
Chr.	Chromosome 8 (mouse)
Band	8|8 B3.3	Start	70,194,289 bp
Band	8|8 B3.3	End	70,202,620 bp
RNA expression pattern
Bgee	Human / Mouse (ortholog); Top expressed in: olfactory bulb; cerebellar vermis; gonad; ganglionic eminence; beta cell; nipple; superior surface of tongue; testicle; thoracic diaphragm; thymus / Top expressed in: zygote; secondary oocyte; primary oocyte; proximal tubule; ganglionic eminence; muscle of thigh; right kidney; granulocyte; quadriceps femoris muscle; bone marrow; More reference expression data
BioGPS	n/a
Gene ontology
Molecular function	DNA binding; metal ion binding; nucleic acid binding; DNA-binding transcription factor activity, RNA polymerase II-specific
Cellular component	intracellular anatomical structure; nucleus
Biological process	regulation of transcription, DNA-templated; transcription, DNA-templated; regulation of transcription by RNA polymerase II
Sources:Amigo / QuickGO
Orthologs
Databases	NCBI: entry; OMA: entry
Species	Human	Mouse
Entrez	79862	620419
Ensembl	ENSG00000188295	ENSMUSG00000092260
UniProt	Q96BR6	n/a
RefSeq (mRNA)	NM_001142572; NM_024804	NM_001200023
RefSeq (protein)	NP_001136044; NP_079080	n/a
Location (UCSC)	Chr 1: 247.1 – 247.1 Mb	Chr 8: 70.19 – 70.2 Mb
PubMed search
- Wikidata
View/Edit Human	View/Edit Mouse

Zinc finger protein 669 is a protein that in humans is encoded by the ZNF669 gene.
