= MTARC2 =

Protein-coding gene in humans

Identifiers
- Aliases: MTARC2, MOSC2, mitochondrial amidoxime reducing component 2, MARC2
- External IDs: OMIM: 614127; MGI: 1914497; GeneCards: MTARC2

Gene location (Human)
Chr.	Chromosome 1 (human)
Band	1q41	Start	220,748,225 bp
Band	1q41	End	220,784,815 bp

Gene location (Mouse)
Chr.	Chromosome 1 (mouse)
Band	1|1 H5	Start	184,545,265 bp
Band	1|1 H5	End	184,578,648 bp
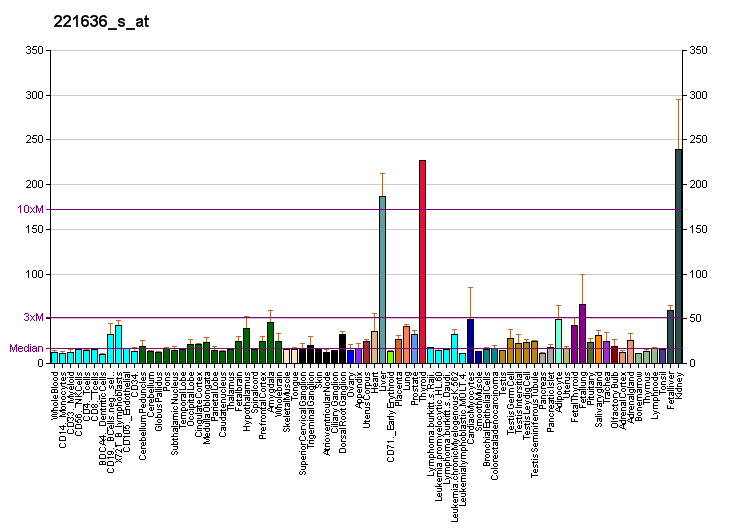

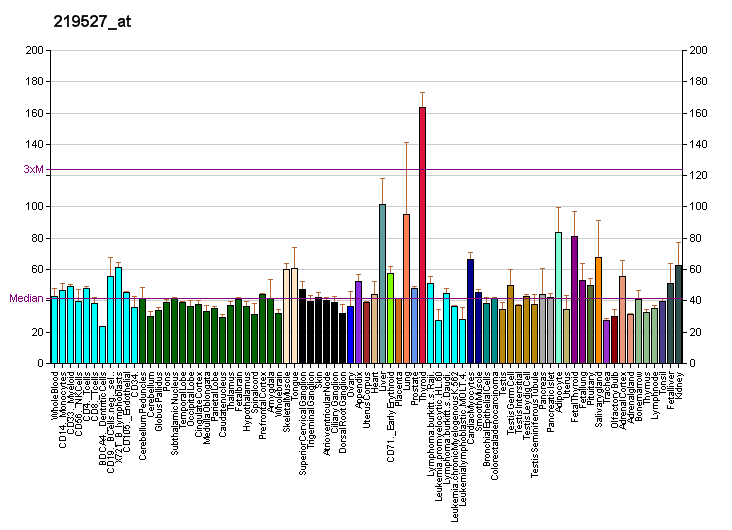
RNA expression pattern
Bgee	Human / Mouse (ortholog); Top expressed in: right lobe of liver; left lobe of thyroid gland; right lobe of thyroid gland; right lung; kidney tubule; duodenum; parotid gland; body of pancreas; jejunal mucosa; human kidney / Top expressed in: duodenum; left lobe of liver; jejunum; right kidney; parotid gland; lacrimal gland; gallbladder; proximal tubule; human kidney; submandibular gland; More reference expression data
BioGPS	More reference expression data
Gene ontology
Molecular function	molybdopterin cofactor binding; molybdenum ion binding; oxidoreductase activity; pyridoxal phosphate binding; nitrate reductase activity; catalytic activity
Cellular component	peroxisome; mitochondrion; membrane; mitochondrial outer membrane
Biological process	detoxification of nitrogen compound; nitrate metabolic process; xenobiotic metabolic process
Sources:Amigo / QuickGO
Orthologs
Databases	NCBI: entry; OMA: entry
Species	Human	Mouse
Entrez	54996	67247
Ensembl	ENSG00000117791	ENSMUSG00000073481
UniProt	Q969Z3	Q922Q1
RefSeq (mRNA)	NM_017898; NM_001317338; NM_001331042	NM_133684; NM_001368285; NM_001368286
RefSeq (protein)	NP_001304267; NP_001317971; NP_060368	NP_598445; NP_001355214; NP_001355215
Location (UCSC)	Chr 1: 220.75 – 220.78 Mb	Chr 1: 184.55 – 184.58 Mb
PubMed search
- Wikidata
View/Edit Human	View/Edit Mouse

MOSC domain-containing protein 2, mitochondrial is a protein that in humans is encoded by the MTARC2 gene (previously MOSC2).
