= Zinc finger MYM-type containing 1 =

Protein found in humans

ZMYM1

Identifiers
- Aliases: ZMYM1, MYM, zinc finger MYM-type containing 1
- External IDs: MGI: 1915560; GeneCards: ZMYM1

Gene location (Human)
Chr.	Chromosome 1 (human)
Band	1p34.3	Start	35,032,172 bp
Band	1p34.3	End	35,115,859 bp

Gene location (Mouse)
Chr.	Chromosome 4 (mouse)
Band	4|4 D2.2	Start	126,940,887 bp
Band	4|4 D2.2	End	126,954,945 bp
RNA expression pattern
Bgee	Human / Mouse (ortholog); Top expressed in: gonad; testicle; Achilles tendon; ventricular zone; stromal cell of endometrium; ganglionic eminence; islet of Langerhans; visceral pleura; Epithelium of choroid plexus; monocyte / Top expressed in: zygote; secondary oocyte; primitive streak; epiblast; primary oocyte; blastocyst; blastocyst; medial ganglionic eminence; morula; tail of embryo; More reference expression data
BioGPS	n/a
Gene ontology
Molecular function	metal ion binding; zinc ion binding; protein dimerization activity; DNA-binding transcription factor activity, RNA polymerase II-specific; DNA binding
Cellular component	nucleus; cytoplasm; nucleoplasm
Biological process	regulation of transcription by RNA polymerase II; cytoskeleton organization; regulation of cell morphogenesis
Sources:Amigo / QuickGO
Orthologs
Databases	NCBI: entry; OMA: entry
Species	Human	Mouse
Entrez	79830	68310
Ensembl	ENSG00000197056	ENSMUSG00000043872
UniProt	Q5SVZ6	n/a
RefSeq (mRNA)	NM_001289088; NM_001289089; NM_001289090; NM_001289091; NM_024772 NM_001319955	NM_026670; NM_001356311
RefSeq (protein)	NP_001276017; NP_001276018; NP_001276019; NP_001276020; NP_001306884 NP_079048	n/a
Location (UCSC)	Chr 1: 35.03 – 35.12 Mb	Chr 4: 126.94 – 126.95 Mb
PubMed search
- Wikidata
View/Edit Human	View/Edit Mouse

Zinc finger MYM-type containing 1 is a protein that in humans is encoded by the ZMYM1 gene.
