= Calcium/calmodulin dependent protein kinase II inhibitor 1 =

Protein found in humans

CAMK2N1

Identifiers
- Aliases: CAMK2N1, PRO1489, calcium/calmodulin dependent protein kinase II inhibitor 1
- External IDs: OMIM: 614986; MGI: 1913509; HomoloGene: 10238; GeneCards: CAMK2N1; OMA:CAMK2N1 - orthologs

Gene location (Human)
Chr.	Chromosome 1 (human)
Band	1p36.12	Start	20,482,391 bp
Band	1p36.12	End	20,486,210 bp

Gene location (Mouse)
Chr.	Chromosome 4 (mouse)
Band	4|4 D3	Start	138,181,625 bp
Band	4|4 D3	End	138,187,434 bp
RNA expression pattern
Bgee	Human / Mouse (ortholog); Top expressed in: Brodmann area 46; parietal lobe; postcentral gyrus; entorhinal cortex; orbitofrontal cortex; middle temporal gyrus; occipital lobe; internal globus pallidus; superior frontal gyrus; primary visual cortex / Top expressed in: prefrontal cortex; olfactory tubercle; cingulate gyrus; primary motor cortex; globus pallidus; piriform cortex; temporal lobe; amygdala; medial dorsal nucleus; visual cortex; More reference expression data
BioGPS	n/a
Gene ontology
Molecular function	protein kinase inhibitor activity; calcium-dependent protein kinase inhibitor activity; protein kinase binding
Cellular component	neuron projection; cell junction; soma; postsynaptic membrane; plasma membrane; dendrite; synapse; membrane; postsynaptic density; intracellular anatomical structure; cellular component
Biological process	negative regulation of protein kinase activity; negative regulation of cell population proliferation; positive regulation of gene expression; negative regulation of cell cycle; negative regulation of proteolysis; negative regulation of ERK1 and ERK2 cascade; negative regulation of cyclin-dependent protein kinase activity
Sources:Amigo / QuickGO
Orthologs
Species	Human	Mouse
Entrez	55450	66259
Ensembl	ENSG00000162545	ENSMUSG00000046447
UniProt	Q7Z7J9	Q6QWF9
RefSeq (mRNA)	NM_018584	NM_025451
RefSeq (protein)	NP_061054	NP_079727
Location (UCSC)	Chr 1: 20.48 – 20.49 Mb	Chr 4: 138.18 – 138.19 Mb
PubMed search
- Wikidata
View/Edit Human	View/Edit Mouse

Calcium/calmodulin dependent protein kinase II inhibitor 1 is a protein that in humans is encoded by the CAMK2N1 gene.
