= ZBED6 =

Protein-coding gene in humans

Identifiers
- Aliases: ZBED6, MGR, zinc finger BED-type containing 6
- External IDs: OMIM: 613512; MGI: 3828086; GeneCards: ZBED6

Gene location (Human)
Chr.	Chromosome 1 (human)
Band	1q32.1	Start	203,795,714 bp
Band	1q32.1	End	203,854,999 bp

Gene location (Mouse)
Chr.	Chromosome 1 (mouse)
Band	1|1 E4	Start	133,547,678 bp
Band	1|1 E4	End	133,589,056 bp
RNA expression pattern
Bgee	Human / Mouse (ortholog); Top expressed in: bone marrow cell; gonad; epithelium of colon; tonsil; islet of Langerhans; stromal cell of endometrium; Achilles tendon; duodenum; smooth muscle tissue; sural nerve / Top expressed in: ascending aorta; aortic valve; tail of embryo; olfactory tubercle; genital tubercle; arcuate nucleus; median eminence; medial geniculate nucleus; inferior colliculi; paraventricular nucleus of hypothalamus; More reference expression data
BioGPS	n/a
Gene ontology
Molecular function	DNA binding; protein dimerization activity; metal ion binding; DNA-binding transcription factor activity; RNA polymerase II transcription regulatory region sequence-specific DNA binding; DNA-binding transcription factor activity, RNA polymerase II-specific
Cellular component	nucleolus; nucleus
Biological process	negative regulation of transcription, DNA-templated; regulation of transcription, DNA-templated; transcription, DNA-templated; regulation of transcription by RNA polymerase II
Sources:Amigo / QuickGO
Orthologs
Databases	NCBI: entry; OMA: entry
Species	Human	Mouse
Entrez	100381270	667118
Ensembl	ENSG00000257315	ENSMUSG00000094410
UniProt	P86452	D2EAC2
RefSeq (mRNA)	NM_001174108; NM_001395895	NM_001166552; NM_001395904
RefSeq (protein)	NP_001167579	NP_001160024; NP_001382833
Location (UCSC)	Chr 1: 203.8 – 203.85 Mb	Chr 1: 133.55 – 133.59 Mb
PubMed search
- Wikidata
View/Edit Human	View/Edit Mouse

Zinc finger, BED-type containing 6 is a protein that in humans is encoded by the ZBED6 gene.
