= PSRC1 =

Protein-coding gene in humans

Identifiers
- Aliases: PSRC1, DDA3, FP3214, proline and serine rich coiled-coil 1
- External IDs: OMIM: 613126; MGI: 1913099; GeneCards: PSRC1

Gene location (Human)
Chr.	Chromosome 1 (human)
Band	1p13.3	Start	109,279,556 bp
Band	1p13.3	End	109,283,186 bp

Gene location (Mouse)
Chr.	Chromosome 3 (mouse)
Band	3|3 F3	Start	108,291,155 bp
Band	3|3 F3	End	108,295,547 bp
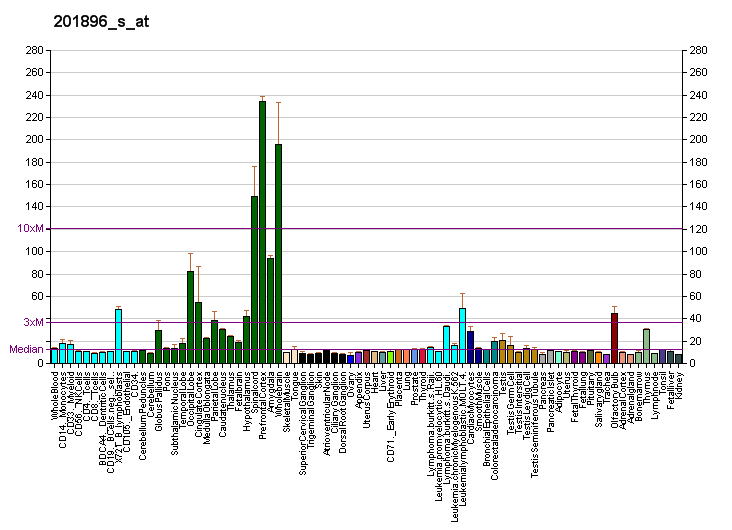
RNA expression pattern
Bgee	Human / Mouse (ortholog); Top expressed in: C1 segment; ventricular zone; inferior olivary nucleus; inferior ganglion of vagus nerve; hippocampus proper; right frontal lobe; Brodmann area 9; substantia nigra; anterior cingulate cortex; primary visual cortex / Top expressed in: zygote; secondary oocyte; ventricular zone; primary oocyte; genital tubercle; epiblast; condyle; calvaria; maxillary prominence; mandibular prominence; More reference expression data
BioGPS	More reference expression data
Gene ontology
Molecular function	protein binding; microtubule binding
Cellular component	spindle microtubule; cytoskeleton; spindle; cytosol; microtubule cytoskeleton; spindle pole; midbody; cytoplasm; nucleoplasm
Biological process	mitotic metaphase plate congression; negative regulation of cell growth; microtubule bundle formation; regulation of mitotic spindle organization; cell division; cell cycle; cellular process or phenomenon; positive regulation of transcription, DNA-templated; positive regulation of microtubule polymerization; positive regulation of cyclin-dependent protein serine/threonine kinase activity
Sources:Amigo / QuickGO
Orthologs
Databases	NCBI: entry; OMA: entry
Species	Human	Mouse
Entrez	84722	56742
Ensembl	ENSG00000134222	ENSMUSG00000068744
UniProt	Q6PGN9; Q5T2Z0	Q9D0P7
RefSeq (mRNA)	NM_001005290; NM_001032290; NM_001032291; NM_032636; NM_001350237 NM_001350238; NM_001350239; NM_001350240; NM_001350241; NM_001350242; NM_001363309; NM_001394002; NM_001394003; NM_001394004; NM_001394005	NM_001190161; NM_019976
RefSeq (protein)	NP_001005290; NP_001027462; NP_116025; NP_001337166; NP_001337167 NP_001337168; NP_001337169; NP_001337170; NP_001337171; NP_001350238	NP_001177090; NP_064360
Location (UCSC)	Chr 1: 109.28 – 109.28 Mb	Chr 3: 108.29 – 108.3 Mb
PubMed search
- Wikidata
View/Edit Human	View/Edit Mouse

Proline/serine-rich coiled-coil protein 1 is a protein that in humans is encoded by the PSRC1 gene.

This gene encodes a proline-rich protein. Studies of the related mouse gene suggest that this gene is regulated by p53 and may participate in p53-mediated growth suppression. Alternatively spliced transcript variants encoding different isoforms have been described.
