= MEAF6 =

Protein-coding gene in humans

Identifiers
- Aliases: MEAF6, C1orf149, CENP-28, EAF6, NY-SAR-91, MYST/Esa1 associated factor 6
- External IDs: OMIM: 611001; MGI: 1917338; GeneCards: MEAF6

Gene location (Human)
Chr.	Chromosome 1 (human)
Band	1p34.3	Start	37,489,993 bp
Band	1p34.3	End	37,514,766 bp

Gene location (Mouse)
Chr.	Chromosome 4 (mouse)
Band	4|4 D2.2	Start	124,978,927 bp
Band	4|4 D2.2	End	125,007,031 bp
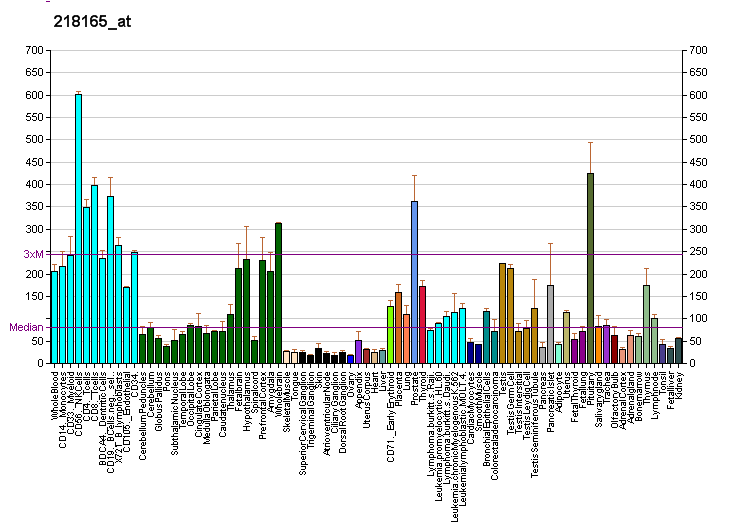
RNA expression pattern
Bgee	Human / Mouse (ortholog); Top expressed in: oocyte; ganglionic eminence; Achilles tendon; anterior pituitary; pons; secondary oocyte; islet of Langerhans; seminal vesicula; prefrontal cortex; bronchial epithelial cell / Top expressed in: superior cervical ganglion; neural layer of retina; genital tubercle; tail of embryo; superior frontal gyrus; ventricular zone; hand; neural tube; zygote; dentate gyrus of hippocampal formation granule cell; More reference expression data
BioGPS	More reference expression data
Gene ontology
Molecular function	protein binding; histone acetyltransferase activity (H3-K23 specific)
Cellular component	NuA4 histone acetyltransferase complex; MOZ/MORF histone acetyltransferase complex; histone acetyltransferase complex; nucleus; nucleolus; chromosome; kinetochore; chromosome, centromeric region; nucleoplasm; NuA3a histone acetyltransferase complex; NuA3b histone acetyltransferase complex
Biological process	histone H4-K12 acetylation; regulation of transcription, DNA-templated; histone H4-K5 acetylation; histone acetylation; histone H4-K8 acetylation; histone H4-K16 acetylation; histone H3-K14 acetylation; histone H2A acetylation; transcription, DNA-templated; regulation of signal transduction by p53 class mediator; chromatin organization; histone H3-K23 acetylation
Sources:Amigo / QuickGO
Orthologs
Databases	NCBI: entry; OMA: entry
Species	Human	Mouse
Entrez	64769	70088
Ensembl	ENSG00000163875	ENSMUSG00000028863
UniProt	Q9HAF1	Q2VPQ9
RefSeq (mRNA)	NM_001270875; NM_001270876; NM_022756	NM_001290701; NM_027310; NM_001374123
RefSeq (protein)	NP_001257804; NP_001257805; NP_073593	NP_001277630; NP_081586; NP_001361052
Location (UCSC)	Chr 1: 37.49 – 37.51 Mb	Chr 4: 124.98 – 125.01 Mb
PubMed search
- Wikidata
View/Edit Human	View/Edit Mouse

Chromatin modification-related protein MEAF6 is a protein that in humans is encoded by the MEAF6 gene.
