= Olfactomedin-like 2B =

Protein found in humans

OLFML2B

Identifiers
- Aliases: OLFML2B, Olfactomedin-like 2b, olfactomedin like 2B
- External IDs: MGI: 2443310; GeneCards: OLFML2B

Gene location (Human)
| Chr. | Chromosome 1 (human) |
| Band | 1q23.3 | Start | 161,983,192 bp |
| Band | 1q23.3 | End | 162,023,869 bp |

Gene location (Mouse)
| Chr. | Chromosome 1 (mouse) |
| Band | 1|1 H3 | Start | 170,472,101 bp |
| Band | 1|1 H3 | End | 170,510,358 bp |
RNA expression pattern
| Bgee | Human / Mouse (ortholog); Top expressed in: decidua; periodontal fiber; gallbladder; vena cava; stromal cell of endometrium; right coronary artery; popliteal artery; tibial arteries; saphenous vein; left coronary artery / Top expressed in: body of femur; granulocyte; umbilical cord; maxillary nerve; metatarsal bones; ascending aorta; mandibular nerve; ankle; sciatic nerve; bones of pectoral girdle; More reference expression data |
| BioGPS | n/a |
Gene ontology
| Molecular function | host cell surface receptor binding |
| Cellular component | extracellular region |
| Biological process | fusion of virus membrane with host plasma membrane |
Sources:Amigo / QuickGO
Orthologs
| Databases | NCBI: entry; OMA: entry |
| Species | Human | Mouse |
| Entrez | 25903 | 320078 |
| Ensembl | ENSG00000162745 | ENSMUSG00000038463 |
| UniProt | Q68BL8 | Q3V1G4 |
| RefSeq (mRNA) | NM_001297713; NM_015441; NM_001347700 | NM_177068 |
| RefSeq (protein) | NP_001284642; NP_001334629; NP_056256 | NP_796042; NP_001391230; NP_001391231; NP_001391233; NP_001391234 NP_001391235; NP_001391236; NP_001391237; NP_001391238; NP_001391239; NP_001391240 |
| Location (UCSC) | Chr 1: 161.98 – 162.02 Mb | Chr 1: 170.47 – 170.51 Mb |
| PubMed search |
- Wikidata
| View/Edit Human | View/Edit Mouse |

Olfactomedin-like 2B is a protein that in humans is encoded by the OLFML2B gene.
