= CATSPERE =

Protein-coding gene in humans

Identifiers
- Aliases: CATSPERE, C1orf101, catsper channel auxiliary subunit epsilon, C10orf101
- External IDs: OMIM: 617510; MGI: 3647531; GeneCards: CATSPERE

Gene location (Human)
Chr.	Chromosome 1 (human)
Band	1q44	Start	244,454,377 bp
Band	1q44	End	244,641,177 bp

Gene location (Mouse)
Chr.	Chromosome 1 (mouse)
Band	1|1 H4	Start	177,635,997 bp
Band	1|1 H4	End	177,790,244 bp
RNA expression pattern
Bgee	Human / Mouse (ortholog); Top expressed in: gonad; left testis; right testis; testicle; sperm; bronchial epithelial cell; Achilles tendon; right uterine tube; olfactory zone of nasal mucosa; stromal cell of endometrium / Top expressed in: spermatocyte; spermatid; testicle; dentate gyrus of hippocampal formation granule cell; primary visual cortex; superior frontal gyrus; cerebellar cortex; hypothalamus; urinary bladder; islet of Langerhans; More reference expression data
BioGPS	n/a
Orthologs
Databases	NCBI: entry; OMA: entry
Species	Human	Mouse
Entrez	257044	631584
Ensembl	ENSG00000179397	ENSMUSG00000102483
UniProt	Q5SY80	P0DP43
RefSeq (mRNA)	NM_001130957; NM_001242340; NM_173807	NM_001368823
RefSeq (protein)	NP_001124429; NP_001229269; NP_776168	XP_006497146; XP_006497147; XP_006497148; XP_006497150; XP_017169520 XP_017169522
Location (UCSC)	Chr 1: 244.45 – 244.64 Mb	Chr 1: 177.64 – 177.79 Mb
PubMed search
- Wikidata
View/Edit Human	View/Edit Mouse

Catsper channel auxiliary subunit epsilon is a protein that in humans is encoded by the CATSPERE gene.
