= THEMIS2 =

Protein-coding gene in humans

Identifiers
- Aliases: THEMIS2, C1orf38, ICB-1, thymocyte selection associated family member 2, ICB1, Chromosome 1 open reading frame 38
- External IDs: OMIM: 617856; MGI: 2446213; HomoloGene: 21009; GeneCards: THEMIS2; OMA:THEMIS2 - orthologs

Gene location (Human)
Chr.	Chromosome 1 (human)
Band	1p35.3	Start	27,872,543 bp
Band	1p35.3	End	27,886,685 bp

Gene location (Mouse)
Chr.	Chromosome 4 (mouse)
Band	4|4 D2.3	Start	132,509,154 bp
Band	4|4 D2.3	End	132,523,698 bp
RNA expression pattern
Bgee	Human / Mouse (ortholog); Top expressed in: monocyte; granulocyte; blood; spleen; bone marrow cell; right lung; upper lobe of left lung; appendix; C1 segment; gallbladder / Top expressed in: granulocyte; lymph node; spleen; mesenteric lymph nodes; blood; stroma of bone marrow; gastrula; subcutaneous adipose tissue; submandibular gland; tibiofemoral joint; More reference expression data
BioGPS	n/a
Gene ontology
Molecular function	protein binding
Cellular component	nucleus; cytoplasm
Biological process	inflammatory response; immune system process; cell adhesion; T cell receptor signaling pathway
Sources:Amigo / QuickGO
Orthologs
Species	Human	Mouse
Entrez	9473	230787
Ensembl	ENSG00000130775	ENSMUSG00000037731
UniProt	Q5TEJ8	Q91YX0
RefSeq (mRNA)	NM_001039477; NM_001105556; NM_001286113; NM_001286115; NM_004848	NM_001033308
RefSeq (protein)	NP_001034566; NP_001099026; NP_001273042; NP_001273044; NP_004839	NP_001028480
Location (UCSC)	Chr 1: 27.87 – 27.89 Mb	Chr 4: 132.51 – 132.52 Mb
PubMed search
- Wikidata
View/Edit Human	View/Edit Mouse

Thymocyte selection associated family member 2 is a protein that in humans is encoded by the THEMIS2 gene. The gene is also known as ICB-1 and C1orf38 in humans, and the orthologue in mice is BC013712. C1orf38 has been associated with cancer susceptibility.
