= MIR6079 =

Protein-coding gene in humans

Identifiers
- Aliases: MIR6079, hsa-mir-6079, microRNA 6079
- External IDs: GeneCards: MIR6079

Gene location (Human)
Chr.	Chromosome 1 (human)
Band	1p34.1	Start	43,838,622 bp
Band	1p34.1	End	43,838,683 bp
RNA expression pattern
Bgee	Human / Mouse (ortholog); Top expressed in: left adrenal gland / n/a; More reference expression data
BioGPS	n/a
Orthologs
Databases	NCBI: entry; OMA: entry
Species	Human	Mouse
Entrez	102464830	n/a
Ensembl	ENSG00000283477	n/a
UniProt	n a	n/a
RefSeq (mRNA)	n/a	n/a
RefSeq (protein)	n/a	n/a
Location (UCSC)	Chr 1: 43.84 – 43.84 Mb	n/a
PubMed search		n/a
- Wikidata
View/Edit Human

MicroRNA 6079 is a protein that in humans is encoded by the MIR6079 gene.

== Function ==
microRNAs (miRNAs) are short (20-24 nt) non-coding RNAs that are involved in post-transcriptional regulation of gene expression in multicellular organisms by affecting both the stability and translation of mRNAs. miRNAs are transcribed by RNA polymerase II as part of capped and polyadenylated primary transcripts (pri-miRNAs) that can be either protein-coding or non-coding. The primary transcript is cleaved by the Drosha ribonuclease III enzyme to produce an approximately 70-nt stem-loop precursor miRNA (pre-miRNA), which is further cleaved by the cytoplasmic Dicer ribonuclease to generate the mature miRNA and antisense miRNA star (miRNA*) products. The mature miRNA is incorporated into a RNA-induced silencing complex (RISC), which recognizes target mRNAs through imperfect base pairing with the miRNA and most commonly results in translational inhibition or destabilization of the target mRNA. The RefSeq represents the predicted microRNA stem-loop.
