= PIP5K1A =

Protein-coding gene in humans

Identifiers
- Aliases: PIP5K1A, phosphatidylinositol-4-phosphate 5-kinase type 1 alpha
- External IDs: OMIM: 603275; MGI: 107929; GeneCards: PIP5K1A
Enzyme activity
EC #	BRENDA	ExPASy	KEGG	MetaCyc
2.7.1.68	↗	↗	↗	↗

Gene location (Human)
Chr.	Chromosome 1 (human)
Band	1q21.3	Start	151,197,949 bp
Band	1q21.3	End	151,249,536 bp

Gene location (Mouse)
Chr.	Chromosome 3 (mouse)
Band	3|3 F2.1	Start	95,058,530 bp
Band	3|3 F2.1	End	95,106,930 bp
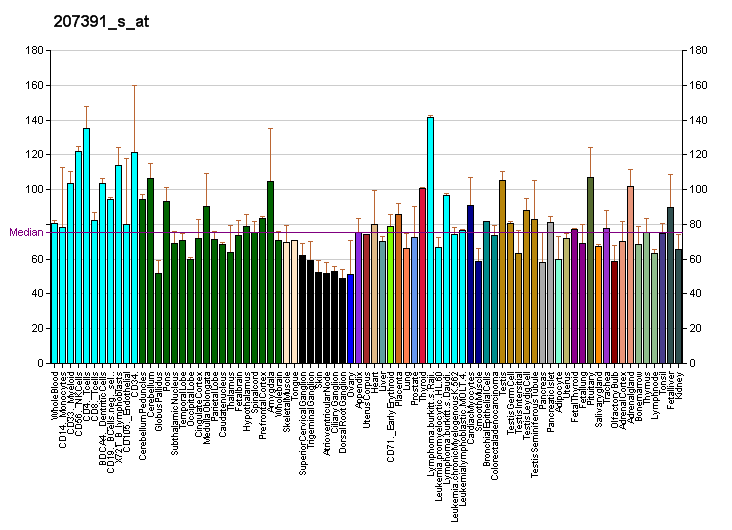

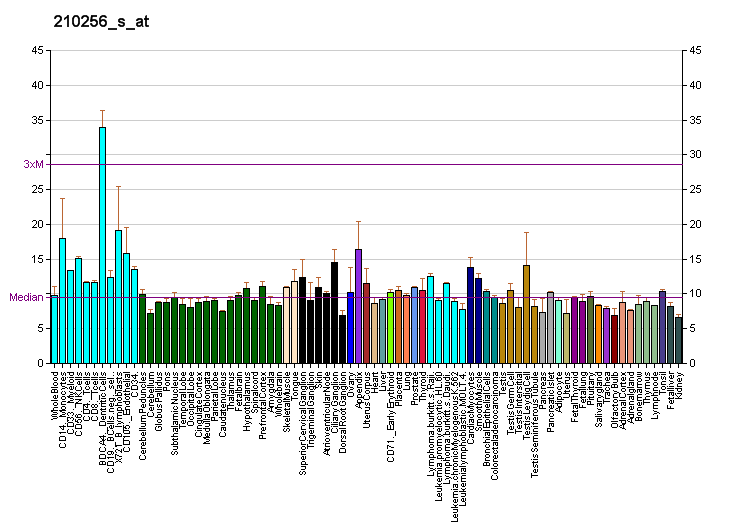
RNA expression pattern
Bgee	Human / Mouse (ortholog); Top expressed in: right testis; epithelium of colon; left testis; sural nerve; Achilles tendon; gastric mucosa; skin of leg; left uterine tube; skin of abdomen; islet of Langerhans / Top expressed in: gastrula; Rostral migratory stream; decidua; olfactory tubercle; cumulus cell; CA3 field; dentate gyrus; pineal gland; dentate gyrus of hippocampal formation granule cell; primary motor cortex; More reference expression data
BioGPS	More reference expression data
Gene ontology
Molecular function	transferase activity; nucleotide binding; 1-phosphatidylinositol-4-phosphate 5-kinase activity; kinase activity; kinase binding; protein binding; phosphatidylinositol phosphate kinase activity; ATP binding; 1-phosphatidylinositol-3-phosphate 5-kinase activity; 1-phosphatidylinositol-5-kinase activity; phosphatidylinositol-3,4-bisphosphate 5-kinase activity; 1-phosphatidylinositol-3-phosphate 4-kinase activity
Cellular component	nuclear speck; mRNA cleavage and polyadenylation specificity factor complex; cell projection; membrane; focal adhesion; ruffle; plasma membrane; nucleoplasm; ruffle membrane; nucleus; lamellipodium; cytoplasm; cytosol
Biological process	fibroblast migration; actin cytoskeleton reorganization; phosphatidylinositol metabolic process; activation of GTPase activity; phosphorylation; keratinocyte differentiation; focal adhesion assembly; phospholipid biosynthetic process; phagocytosis; cell chemotaxis; glycerophospholipid metabolic process; ruffle assembly; cell migration; signal transduction; phosphatidylinositol phosphate biosynthetic process; regulation of phosphatidylinositol 3-kinase signaling; phosphatidylinositol biosynthetic process; protein localization to plasma membrane
Sources:Amigo / QuickGO
Orthologs
Databases	NCBI: entry; OMA: entry
Species	Human	Mouse
Entrez	8394	18720
Ensembl	ENSG00000143398	ENSMUSG00000028126
UniProt	Q99755	P70182
RefSeq (mRNA)	NM_001135636; NM_001135637; NM_001135638; NM_003557; NM_001330689	NM_001293707; NM_008847
RefSeq (protein)	NP_001129108; NP_001129109; NP_001129110; NP_001317618; NP_003548	NP_001280636; NP_032873
Location (UCSC)	Chr 1: 151.2 – 151.25 Mb	Chr 3: 95.06 – 95.11 Mb
PubMed search
- Wikidata
View/Edit Human	View/Edit Mouse

Phosphatidylinositol-4-phosphate 5-kinase type-1 alpha is an enzyme that in humans is encoded by the PIP5K1A gene.
