= Consortin =

Protein found in humans

CNST

Identifiers
- Aliases: CNST, C1orf71, PPP1R64, consortin, connexin sorting protein
- External IDs: OMIM: 613439; MGI: 2445141; GeneCards: CNST

Gene location (Human)
Chr.	Chromosome 1 (human)
Band	1q44	Start	246,566,444 bp
Band	1q44	End	246,668,595 bp

Gene location (Mouse)
Chr.	Chromosome 1 (mouse)
Band	1|1 H4	Start	179,373,935 bp
Band	1|1 H4	End	179,455,043 bp
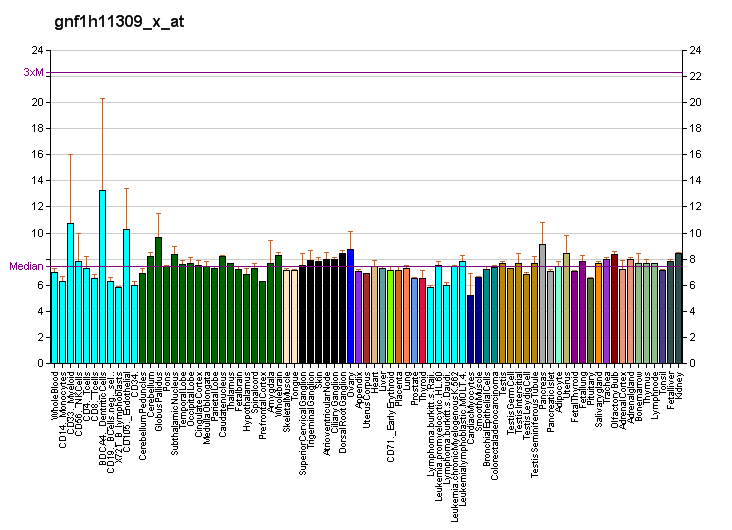

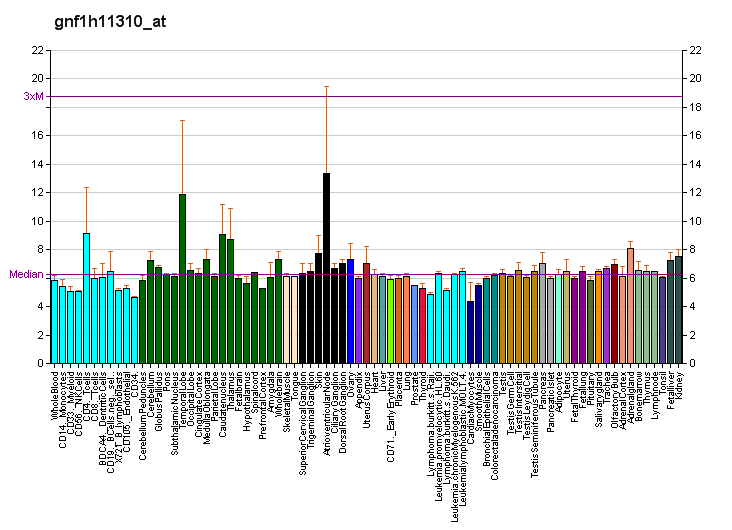

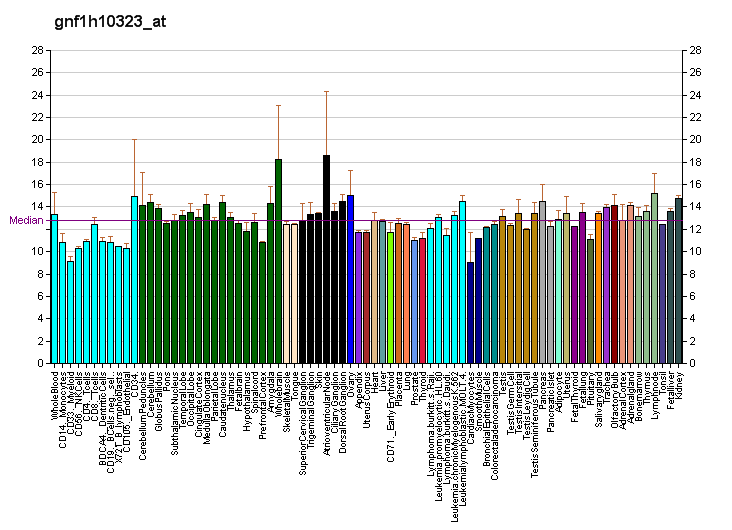
RNA expression pattern
Bgee	Human / Mouse (ortholog); Top expressed in: middle temporal gyrus; spinal ganglia; secondary oocyte; vastus lateralis muscle; deltoid muscle; Skeletal muscle tissue of rectus abdominis; trigeminal ganglion; visceral pleura; gastrocnemius muscle; lateral nuclear group of thalamus / Top expressed in: vestibular membrane of cochlear duct; primary oocyte; zygote; blood; habenula; Epithelium of choroid plexus; extraocular muscle; retinal pigment epithelium; secondary oocyte; knee joint; More reference expression data
BioGPS	More reference expression data
Gene ontology
Molecular function	phosphatase binding; protein binding; connexin binding
Cellular component	integral component of membrane; trans-Golgi network; plasma membrane; Golgi apparatus; transport vesicle; membrane; cytoplasmic vesicle; intracellular membrane-bounded organelle; protein-containing complex
Biological process	negative regulation of phosphatase activity; positive regulation of Golgi to plasma membrane protein transport
Sources:Amigo / QuickGO
Orthologs
Databases	NCBI: entry; OMA: entry
Species	Human	Mouse
Entrez	163882	226744
Ensembl	ENSG00000162852	ENSMUSG00000038949
UniProt	Q6PJW8	Q8CBC4
RefSeq (mRNA)	NM_001139459; NM_152609	NM_146105
RefSeq (protein)	NP_001132931; NP_689822	NP_666217
Location (UCSC)	Chr 1: 246.57 – 246.67 Mb	Chr 1: 179.37 – 179.46 Mb
PubMed search
- Wikidata
View/Edit Human	View/Edit Mouse

Consortin (CNST) is a protein that in humans is encoded by the CNST gene.
