= Flavin adenine dinucleotide synthetase 1 =

Protein found in humans

FLAD1

Identifiers
- Aliases: FLAD1, FAD1, FADS, PP591, flavin adenine dinucleotide synthetase 1, LSMFLAD
- External IDs: OMIM: 610595; MGI: 2443030; GeneCards: FLAD1
Enzyme activity
EC #	BRENDA	ExPASy	KEGG	MetaCyc
2.7.7.2	↗	↗	↗	↗
3.6.1.18	↗	↗	↗	↗
3.6.1.22	↗	↗	↗	↗

Gene location (Human)
Chr.	Chromosome 1 (human)
Band	1q21.3	Start	154,983,338 bp
Band	1q21.3	End	154,993,111 bp

Gene location (Mouse)
Chr.	Chromosome 3 (mouse)
Band	3|3 F1	Start	89,401,004 bp
Band	3|3 F1	End	89,411,870 bp
RNA expression pattern
Bgee	Human / Mouse (ortholog); Top expressed in: apex of heart; granulocyte; mucosa of transverse colon; muscle of thigh; skin of leg; skin of abdomen; gonad; gastrocnemius muscle; right lobe of thyroid gland; right lobe of liver / Top expressed in: interventricular septum; extraocular muscle; left lobe of liver; digastric muscle; muscle of thigh; temporal muscle; sternocleidomastoid muscle; triceps brachii muscle; right kidney; right ventricle; More reference expression data
BioGPS	n/a
Gene ontology
Molecular function	transferase activity; nucleotide binding; nucleotidyltransferase activity; protein binding; catalytic activity; ATP binding; FMN adenylyltransferase activity
Cellular component	mitochondrial matrix; plasma membrane; mitochondrion; cytoplasm; cytosol
Biological process	riboflavin metabolic process; metabolism; FAD biosynthetic process
Sources:Amigo / QuickGO
Orthologs
Databases	NCBI: entry; OMA: entry
Species	Human	Mouse
Entrez	80308	319945
Ensembl	ENSG00000160688	ENSMUSG00000042642
UniProt	Q8NFF5	Q8R123
RefSeq (mRNA)	NM_001184891; NM_001184892; NM_025207; NM_201398	NM_177041
RefSeq (protein)	NP_001171820; NP_001171821; NP_079483; NP_958800	NP_796015; NP_001349304; NP_001349305
Location (UCSC)	Chr 1: 154.98 – 154.99 Mb	Chr 3: 89.4 – 89.41 Mb
PubMed search
- Wikidata
View/Edit Human	View/Edit Mouse

Flavin adenine dinucleotide synthetase 1 is a protein that in humans is encoded by the FLAD1 gene.

== Function ==
This gene encodes the enzyme that catalyzes adenylation of flavin mononucleotide (FMN) to form flavin adenine dinucleotide (FAD) coenzyme. Alternatively spliced transcript variants encoding distinct isoforms have been observed.
