= Coiled-coil domain containing 17 =

Protein found in humans

CCDC17

Identifiers
- Aliases: CCDC17, coiled-coil domain containing 17
- External IDs: MGI: 1915667; HomoloGene: 77410; GeneCards: CCDC17; OMA:CCDC17 - orthologs

Gene location (Human)
Chr.	Chromosome 1 (human)
Band	1p34.1	Start	45,620,044 bp
Band	1p34.1	End	45,624,057 bp

Gene location (Mouse)
Chr.	Chromosome 4 (mouse)
Band	4|4 D1	Start	116,453,851 bp
Band	4|4 D1	End	116,457,463 bp
RNA expression pattern
Bgee	Human / Mouse (ortholog); Top expressed in: right uterine tube; bronchial epithelial cell; olfactory zone of nasal mucosa; mucosa of paranasal sinus; nasal epithelium; right lung; left uterine tube; trachea; epithelium of nasopharynx; caput epididymis / Top expressed in: right kidney; granulocyte; proximal tubule; neural layer of retina; embryo; esophagus; morula; embryo; lip; visual cortex; More reference expression data
BioGPS	n/a
Orthologs
Species	Human	Mouse
Entrez	149483	622665
Ensembl	ENSG00000159588	ENSMUSG00000034035
UniProt	Q96LX7	Q8CE13
RefSeq (mRNA)	NM_001114938; NM_001190182; NM_152500	NM_001037916
RefSeq (protein)	NP_001108410; NP_001177111	NP_001033005
Location (UCSC)	Chr 1: 45.62 – 45.62 Mb	Chr 4: 116.45 – 116.46 Mb
PubMed search
- Wikidata
View/Edit Human	View/Edit Mouse

Coiled-coil domain containing 17 is a protein that in humans is encoded by the CCDC17 gene.
