= GBAP1 =

Gene found in humans

Identifiers
- Aliases: GBAP1, GBAP, glucosylceramidase beta pseudogene 1, GBA, Beta-GC, GLUC, GC
- External IDs: GeneCards: GBAP1

Gene location (Human)
Chr.	Chromosome 1 (human)
Band	1q22	Start	155,213,821 bp
Band	1q22	End	155,227,574 bp
Orthologs
Databases	NCBI: entry; OMA: entry
Species	Human	Mouse
Entrez	2630	n/a
Ensembl	ENSG00000160766	n/a
UniProt	n a	n/a
RefSeq (mRNA)	n/a	n/a
RefSeq (protein)	n/a	n/a
Location (UCSC)	Chr 1: 155.21 – 155.23 Mb	n/a
PubMed search		n/a
- Wikidata
View/Edit Human

Glucosidase, beta; acid, pseudogene, also known as GBAP, is a human gene.
