= Mitoguardin 1 =

Protein found in humans

MIGA1

Identifiers
- Aliases: MIGA1, FAM73A, family with sequence similarity 73 member A, mitoguardin 1
- External IDs: OMIM: 616773; MGI: 1924567; GeneCards: MIGA1

Gene location (Human)
Chr.	Chromosome 1 (human)
Band	1p31.1	Start	77,779,624 bp
Band	1p31.1	End	77,879,539 bp

Gene location (Mouse)
Chr.	Chromosome 3 (mouse)
Band	3|3 H3	Start	151,979,486 bp
Band	3|3 H3	End	152,046,044 bp
RNA expression pattern
Bgee	Human / Mouse (ortholog); Top expressed in: endothelial cell; pars compacta; Brodmann area 23; pars reticulata; lateral nuclear group of thalamus; pancreatic epithelial cell; pons; subthalamic nucleus; inferior ganglion of vagus nerve; external globus pallidus / Top expressed in: dorsomedial hypothalamic nucleus; ventral tegmental area; pontine nuclei; dorsal tegmental nucleus; lateral hypothalamus; medial vestibular nucleus; mammillary body; piriform cortex; superior colliculus; medial dorsal nucleus; More reference expression data
BioGPS	n/a
Gene ontology
Molecular function	protein binding; protein homodimerization activity; protein heterodimerization activity
Cellular component	mitochondrial outer membrane; integral component of membrane; mitochondrion; membrane; integral component of plasma membrane
Biological process	mitochondrial fusion
Sources:Amigo / QuickGO
Orthologs
Databases	NCBI: entry; OMA: entry
Species	Human	Mouse
Entrez	374986	215708
Ensembl	ENSG00000180488	ENSMUSG00000054942
UniProt	Q8NAN2	Q4QQM5
RefSeq (mRNA)	NM_001270384; NM_198549; NM_001363583; NM_001363584; NM_001363586	NM_001162375; NM_174868
RefSeq (protein)	NP_001257313; NP_940951; NP_001350512; NP_001350513; NP_001350515	NP_001155847; NP_777357
Location (UCSC)	Chr 1: 77.78 – 77.88 Mb	Chr 3: 151.98 – 152.05 Mb
PubMed search
- Wikidata
View/Edit Human	View/Edit Mouse

Mitoguardin 1 is a protein that in humans is encoded by the MIGA1 gene.
