= Exonuclease 5 =

Protein found in humans

EXO5

Identifiers
- Aliases: EXO5, C1orf176, DEM1, Exo V, hExo5, exonuclease 5
- External IDs: MGI: 1920422; GeneCards: EXO5

Gene location (Human)
| Chr. | Chromosome 1 (human) |
| Band | 1p34.2 | Start | 40,508,741 bp |
| Band | 1p34.2 | End | 40,516,038 bp |

Gene location (Mouse)
| Chr. | Chromosome 4 (mouse) |
| Band | 4|4 D2.2 | Start | 120,778,393 bp |
| Band | 4|4 D2.2 | End | 120,782,214 bp |
RNA expression pattern
| Bgee | Human / Mouse (ortholog); Top expressed in: secondary oocyte; buccal mucosa cell; tendon of biceps brachii; testicle; granulocyte; ganglionic eminence; stromal cell of endometrium; ventricular zone; islet of Langerhans; monocyte / Top expressed in: hand; medial ganglionic eminence; superior cervical ganglion; secondary oocyte; renal corpuscle; medullary collecting duct; trigeminal ganglion; primary oocyte; otolith organ; zygote; More reference expression data |
| BioGPS | n/a |
Gene ontology
| Molecular function | DNA binding; 4 iron, 4 sulfur cluster binding; nuclease activity; iron-sulfur cluster binding; single-stranded DNA 5'-3' exodeoxyribonuclease activity; exonuclease activity; protein homodimerization activity; hydrolase activity; single-stranded DNA 3'-5' exodeoxyribonuclease activity; metal ion binding |
| Cellular component | cytosol; nucleus; nucleoplasm; cytoplasm |
| Biological process | interstrand cross-link repair; DNA repair; cellular response to DNA damage stimulus; nucleic acid phosphodiester bond hydrolysis |
Sources:Amigo / QuickGO
Orthologs
| Databases | NCBI: entry; OMA: entry |
| Species | Human | Mouse |
| Entrez | 64789 | 73172 |
| Ensembl | ENSG00000164002 | ENSMUSG00000028629 |
| UniProt | Q9H790 | Q9CXP9 |
| RefSeq (mRNA) | NM_001346946; NM_001346947; NM_001346948; NM_001346949; NM_001346950 NM_001346951; NM_001346952; NM_001346953; NM_001346954; NM_001346955; NM_001346956; NM_022774 | NM_001160043; NM_028457 |
| RefSeq (protein) | NP_001333875; NP_001333876; NP_001333877; NP_001333878; NP_001333879 NP_001333880; NP_001333881; NP_001333882; NP_001333883; NP_001333884; NP_001333885; NP_073611 | NP_001153515; NP_082733 |
| Location (UCSC) | Chr 1: 40.51 – 40.52 Mb | Chr 4: 120.78 – 120.78 Mb |
| PubMed search |
- Wikidata
| View/Edit Human | View/Edit Mouse |

Exonuclease 5 is a protein that in humans is encoded by the EXO5 gene.

== Function ==
The protein encoded by this gene is a single-stranded DNA (ssDNA)-specific exonuclease that can slide along the DNA before cutting it. However, human replication protein A binds ssDNA and restricts sliding of the encoded protein, providing a 5'-directionality to the enzyme. This protein localizes to nuclear repair loci after DNA damage. [provided by RefSeq, Nov 2016].
