= TEX35 =

Protein-coding gene in humans

Identifiers
- Aliases: TEX35, C1orf49, TSC24, testis expressed 35
- External IDs: MGI: 1920685; GeneCards: TEX35

Gene location (Human)
Chr.	Chromosome 1 (human)
Band	1q25.2	Start	178,513,109 bp
Band	1q25.2	End	178,548,602 bp

Gene location (Mouse)
Chr.	Chromosome 1 (mouse)
Band	1|1 H1	Start	156,926,709 bp
Band	1|1 H1	End	156,936,250 bp
RNA expression pattern
Bgee	Human / Mouse (ortholog); Top expressed in: left testis; right testis; sperm; testicle; duodenum; sensory nervous system; face; sensory organ; mucosa of nose; atrium / Top expressed in: seminiferous tubule; spermatid; spermatocyte; secondary oocyte; zygote; embryo; blastocyst; primary oocyte; embryo; sternocleidomastoid muscle; More reference expression data
BioGPS	n/a
Orthologs
Databases	NCBI: entry; OMA: entry
Species	Human	Mouse
Entrez	84066	73435
Ensembl	ENSG00000240021	ENSMUSG00000026592
UniProt	Q5T0J7	Q14BK3
RefSeq (mRNA)	NM_032126; NM_001170722; NM_001170723; NM_001170724	NM_028540; NM_001305059; NM_001305061; NM_001305062; NM_001305063 NM_001374637; NM_001400230; NM_001400232; NM_001400233
RefSeq (protein)	NP_001164193; NP_001164194; NP_001164195; NP_115502	NP_001291988; NP_001291990; NP_001291991; NP_001291992; NP_082816 NP_001361566; NP_001387159; NP_001387161; NP_001387162
Location (UCSC)	Chr 1: 178.51 – 178.55 Mb	Chr 1: 156.93 – 156.94 Mb
PubMed search
- Wikidata
View/Edit Human	View/Edit Mouse

Testis-expressed protein 35 is a protein that in humans is encoded by the TEX35 gene. Not much has been reported about the function of this protein, but it is located in the microtubules of the cytoskeleton, especially in cells found in the testis.
