= BCAS2 =

Protein-coding gene in humans

Identifiers
- Aliases: BCAS2, DAM1, SPF27, Snt309, breast carcinoma amplified sequence 2, pre-mRNA processing factor, BCAS2 pre-mRNA processing factor
- External IDs: OMIM: 605783; MGI: 1915433; GeneCards: BCAS2

Gene location (Human)
Chr.	Chromosome 1 (human)
Band	1p13.2	Start	114,567,557 bp
Band	1p13.2	End	114,581,629 bp

Gene location (Mouse)
Chr.	Chromosome 3 (mouse)
Band	3|3 F2.2	Start	103,078,971 bp
Band	3|3 F2.2	End	103,086,482 bp
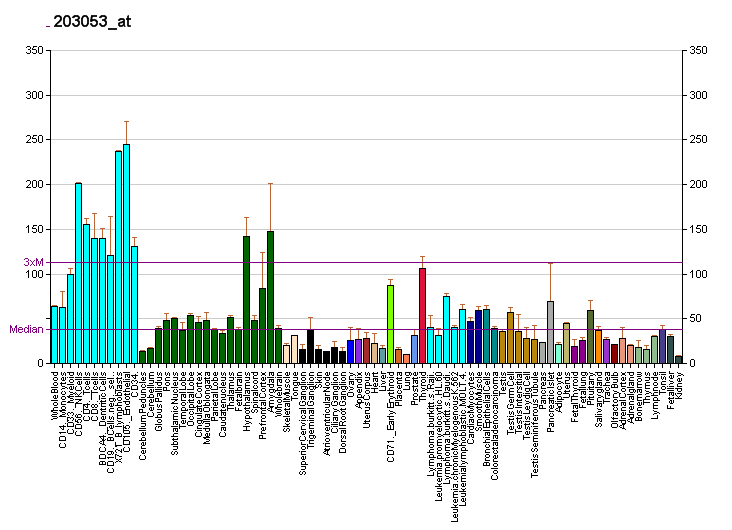
RNA expression pattern
Bgee	Human / Mouse (ortholog); Top expressed in: secondary oocyte; Achilles tendon; palpebral conjunctiva; glutes; pons; endothelial cell; islet of Langerhans; parietal pleura; Skeletal muscle tissue of rectus abdominis; pars compacta / Top expressed in: mandibular prominence; maxillary prominence; endocardial cushion; superior cervical ganglion; dorsomedial hypothalamic nucleus; paraventricular nucleus of hypothalamus; human fetus; atrioventricular valve; migratory enteric neural crest cell; somite; More reference expression data
BioGPS	More reference expression data
Gene ontology
Molecular function	protein binding
Cellular component	DNA replication factor A complex; catalytic step 2 spliceosome; spliceosomal complex; nucleolus; precatalytic spliceosome; Prp19 complex; nucleoplasm; nucleus; centrosome; nuclear speck; U2-type catalytic step 2 spliceosome
Biological process	RNA splicing, via transesterification reactions; mRNA processing; RNA splicing; mRNA splicing, via spliceosome
Sources:Amigo / QuickGO
Orthologs
Databases	NCBI: entry; OMA: entry
Species	Human	Mouse
Entrez	10286	68183
Ensembl	ENSG00000116752	ENSMUSG00000005687
UniProt	O75934	Q9D287
RefSeq (mRNA)	NM_005872	NM_026602; NM_001356330; NM_001356331
RefSeq (protein)	NP_005863	NP_080878; NP_001343259; NP_001343260
Location (UCSC)	Chr 1: 114.57 – 114.58 Mb	Chr 3: 103.08 – 103.09 Mb
PubMed search
- Wikidata
View/Edit Human	View/Edit Mouse

Pre-mRNA-splicing factor SPF27 is a protein that in humans is encoded by the BCAS2 gene.
