= Coiled-coil domain containing 18 =

Protein found in humans

CCDC18

Identifiers
- Aliases: CCDC18, NY-SAR-41, coiled-coil domain containing 18
- External IDs: MGI: 1922974; GeneCards: CCDC18

Gene location (Human)
Chr.	Chromosome 1 (human)
Band	1p22.1	Start	93,179,919 bp
Band	1p22.1	End	93,278,730 bp

Gene location (Mouse)
Chr.	Chromosome 5 (mouse)
Band	5|5 F	Start	108,280,741 bp
Band	5|5 F	End	108,381,494 bp
RNA expression pattern
Bgee	Human / Mouse (ortholog); Top expressed in: testicle; gonad; ventricular zone; bone marrow cell; left testis; Achilles tendon; right testis; oocyte; ganglionic eminence; monocyte / Top expressed in: zygote; secondary oocyte; tail of embryo; spermatid; primary oocyte; spermatocyte; genital tubercle; blastocyst; embryo; morula; More reference expression data
BioGPS	n/a
Orthologs
Databases	NCBI: entry; OMA: entry
Species	Human	Mouse
Entrez	343099	73254
Ensembl	ENSG00000122483	ENSMUSG00000056531
UniProt	Q5T9S5	Q640L5
RefSeq (mRNA)	NM_001306076; NM_206886; NM_001378204	NM_028481
RefSeq (protein)	NP_001293005; NP_996769; NP_001365133	NP_082757
Location (UCSC)	Chr 1: 93.18 – 93.28 Mb	Chr 5: 108.28 – 108.38 Mb
PubMed search
- Wikidata
View/Edit Human	View/Edit Mouse

Coiled-coil domain containing 18 is a protein that in humans is encoded by the CCDC18 gene.
