= NUCKS1 =

Protein-coding gene in humans

Identifiers
- Aliases: NUCKS1, NUCKS, JC7, nuclear casein kinase and cyclin-dependent kinase substrate 1, nuclear casein kinase and cyclin dependent kinase substrate 1
- External IDs: OMIM: 611912; MGI: 1934811; GeneCards: NUCKS1

Gene location (Human)
| Chr. | Chromosome 1 (human) |
| Band | 1q32.1 | Start | 205,712,822 bp |
| Band | 1q32.1 | End | 205,750,182 bp |

Gene location (Mouse)
| Chr. | Chromosome 1 (mouse) |
| Band | 1|1 E4 | Start | 131,838,272 bp |
| Band | 1|1 E4 | End | 131,864,059 bp |
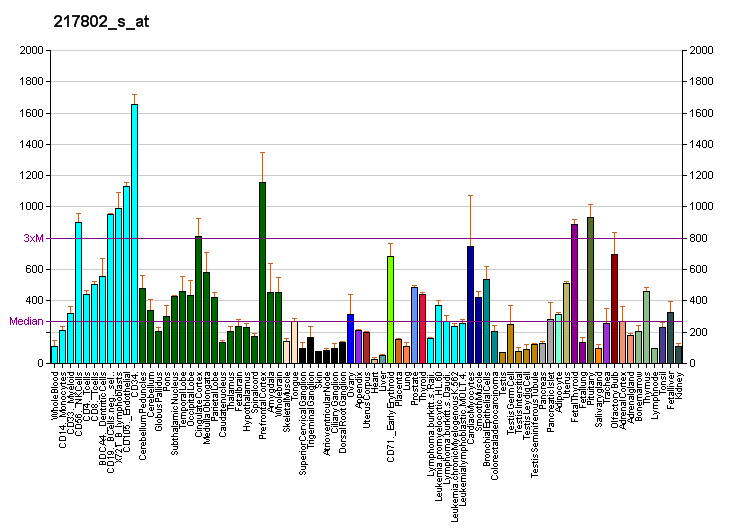
RNA expression pattern
| Bgee | Human / Mouse (ortholog); Top expressed in: tendon of biceps brachii; parietal pleura; internal globus pallidus; germinal epithelium; visceral pleura; middle temporal gyrus; external globus pallidus; pars reticulata; seminal vesicula; tibia / Top expressed in: Rostral migratory stream; primitive streak; ciliary body; abdominal wall; migratory enteric neural crest cell; dermis; Gonadal ridge; renal corpuscle; internal carotid artery; vas deferens; More reference expression data |
| BioGPS | More reference expression data |
Gene ontology
| Molecular function | DNA-binding transcription activator activity, RNA polymerase II-specific; transcription factor binding; chromatin binding; double-stranded DNA binding; single-stranded DNA binding; RNA binding |
| Cellular component | cytoplasm; nucleus; chromatin; nucleolus |
| Biological process | positive regulation of insulin receptor signaling pathway; transcription by RNA polymerase II; glucose homeostasis; positive regulation of transcription by RNA polymerase II; interstrand cross-link repair; regulation of DNA strand elongation; cellular response to X-ray; regulation of DNA replication; gene conversion; double-strand break repair via homologous recombination; regulation of transcription by RNA polymerase II; replication fork processing; cellular glucose homeostasis; chromatin organization; regulation of insulin receptor signaling pathway |
Sources:Amigo / QuickGO
Orthologs
| Databases | NCBI: entry; OMA: entry |
| Species | Human | Mouse |
| Entrez | 64710 | 98415 |
| Ensembl | ENSG00000069275 | ENSMUSG00000026434 |
| UniProt | Q9H1E3 | Q80XU3 |
| RefSeq (mRNA) | NM_022731 | NM_001145804; NM_175294 |
| RefSeq (protein) | NP_073568 | NP_001139276; NP_780503 |
| Location (UCSC) | Chr 1: 205.71 – 205.75 Mb | Chr 1: 131.84 – 131.86 Mb |
| PubMed search |
- Wikidata
| View/Edit Human | View/Edit Mouse |

Nuclear ubiquitous casein and cyclin-dependent kinases substrate is a protein that in humans is encoded by the NUCKS1 gene.
