= CCDST =

Non-coding RNA in humans

Identifiers
- Aliases: CCDST, FLG antisense RNA 1, LINC02962, uncharacterized LOC112268240, long intergenic non-protein coding RNA 2962
- External IDs: GeneCards: CCDST

Gene location (Human)
Chr.	Chromosome 1 (human)
Band	1q21.3	Start	152,168,125 bp
Band	1q21.3	End	152,445,456 bp
RNA expression pattern
Bgee	Human / Mouse (ortholog); Top expressed in: buccal mucosa cell; testicle; sural nerve; oral cavity; bone marrow cell; right ovary; left ovary; amniotic fluid; vagina; left uterine tube / n/a; More reference expression data
BioGPS	n/a
Orthologs
Databases	NCBI: entry, entry; OMA: entry
Species	Human	Mouse
Entrez	339400,112268240; 339400,112268240	n/a
Ensembl	ENSG00000237975	n/a
UniProt	n a	n/a
RefSeq (mRNA)	n/a	n/a
RefSeq (protein)	n/a	n/a
Location (UCSC)	Chr 1: 152.17 – 152.45 Mb	n/a
PubMed search		n/a
- Wikidata
View/Edit Human

Cervical cancer associated DHX9 suppressive transcript is a non-coding RNA that in humans is encoded by the gene CCDST (previously FLG-AS1).
