= Family with sequence similarity 87 member B =

Protein found in humans

FAM87B

Identifiers
- Aliases: FAM87B, family with sequence similarity 87 member B
- External IDs: GeneCards: FAM87B

Gene location (Human)
Chr.	Chromosome 1 (human)
Band	1p36.33	Start	817,371 bp
Band	1p36.33	End	819,837 bp
RNA expression pattern
Bgee	Human / Mouse (ortholog); Top expressed in: bone marrow cell; tibial arteries; skeletal muscle tissue; ventricular zone; right adrenal gland; left adrenal cortex; right adrenal cortex; sural nerve; subcutaneous adipose tissue; right uterine tube / n/a; More reference expression data
BioGPS	n/a
Orthologs
Databases	NCBI: entry; OMA: entry
Species	Human	Mouse
Entrez	400728	n/a
Ensembl	ENSG00000177757	n/a
UniProt	n a	n/a
RefSeq (mRNA)	NM_207464	n/a
RefSeq (protein)	n/a	n/a
Location (UCSC)	Chr 1: 0.82 – 0.82 Mb	n/a
PubMed search		n/a
- Wikidata
View/Edit Human

Family with sequence similarity 87 member B is a protein that in humans is encoded by the FAM87B gene.
