= PRR9 =

Protein-coding gene in humans

Identifiers
- Aliases: PRR9, proline rich 9
- External IDs: MGI: 1925680; GeneCards: PRR9

Gene location (Human)
Chr.	Chromosome 1 (human)
Band	1q21.3	Start	153,217,584 bp
Band	1q21.3	End	153,219,310 bp

Gene location (Mouse)
Chr.	Chromosome 3 (mouse)
Band	3|3 F1	Start	92,029,511 bp
Band	3|3 F1	End	92,031,254 bp
RNA expression pattern
Bgee	Human / Mouse (ortholog); Top expressed in: skin of arm; testicle; sperm; skin of hip; germinal epithelium; nipple; gonad; right testis; left testis; amniotic fluid / Top expressed in: hair follicle; lip; skin of abdomen; skin of external ear; skin of back; embryo; sexually immature organism; esophagus; dermis; condyle; More reference expression data
BioGPS	n/a
Gene ontology
Molecular function	structural molecule activity
Cellular component	cytoplasm; cornified envelope
Biological process	peptide cross-linking; keratinocyte differentiation
Sources:Amigo / QuickGO
Orthologs
Databases	NCBI: entry; OMA: entry
Species	Human	Mouse
Entrez	574414	109314
Ensembl	ENSG00000203783	ENSMUSG00000056270
UniProt	Q5T870	Q8BV84
RefSeq (mRNA)	NM_001195571	NM_175424
RefSeq (protein)	NP_001182500	NP_780633
Location (UCSC)	Chr 1: 153.22 – 153.22 Mb	Chr 3: 92.03 – 92.03 Mb
PubMed search
- Wikidata
View/Edit Human	View/Edit Mouse

Proline rich 9 is a protein that in humans is encoded by the PRR9 gene.
