= NOC2L =

Protein-coding gene in humans

Identifiers
- Aliases: NOC2L, NET15, NET7, NIR, PPP1R112, NOC2 like nucleolar associated transcriptional repressor
- External IDs: OMIM: 610770; MGI: 1931051; GeneCards: NOC2L

Gene location (Human)
Chr.	Chromosome 1 (human)
Band	1p36.33	Start	944,203 bp
Band	1p36.33	End	959,309 bp

Gene location (Mouse)
Chr.	Chromosome 4 (mouse)
Band	4|4 E2	Start	156,320,376 bp
Band	4|4 E2	End	156,332,073 bp
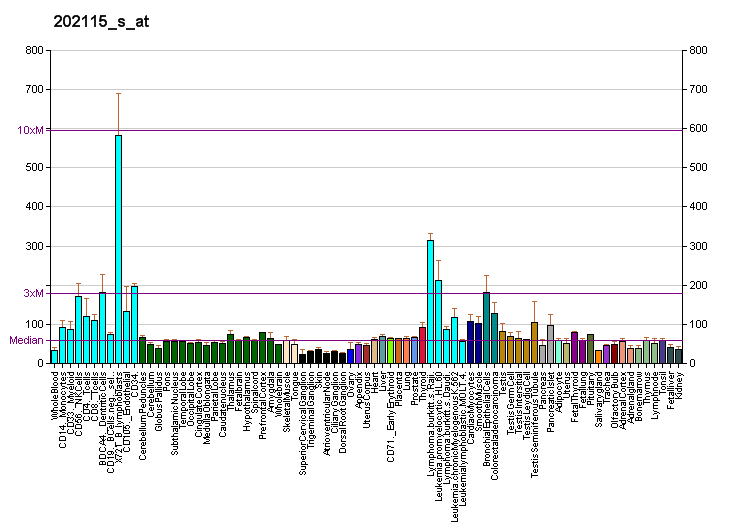
RNA expression pattern
Bgee	Human / Mouse (ortholog); Top expressed in: right uterine tube; left testis; right testis; right hemisphere of cerebellum; skin of leg; gastrocnemius muscle; skin of abdomen; anterior pituitary; right lobe of liver; canal of the cervix / Top expressed in: ectoderm; otic vesicle; otic placode; saccule; tail of embryo; epiblast; yolk sac; ventricular zone; genital tubercle; superior frontal gyrus; More reference expression data
BioGPS	More reference expression data
Gene ontology
Molecular function	histone binding; nucleosome binding; chromatin binding; protein binding; transcription corepressor activity; RNA binding
Cellular component	Noc1p-Noc2p complex; Noc2p-Noc3p complex; nucleolus; nucleus; nucleoplasm; cytosol
Biological process	cellular response to UV; negative regulation of B cell apoptotic process; negative regulation of histone acetylation; negative regulation of transcription by RNA polymerase II; regulation of transcription, DNA-templated; transcription, DNA-templated; negative regulation of intrinsic apoptotic signaling pathway; apoptotic process; ribosomal large subunit biogenesis; regulation of signal transduction by p53 class mediator
Sources:Amigo / QuickGO
Orthologs
Databases	NCBI: entry; OMA: entry
Species	Human	Mouse
Entrez	26155	57741
Ensembl	ENSG00000188976	ENSMUSG00000095567
UniProt	Q9Y3T9	Q9WV70
RefSeq (mRNA)	NM_015658	NM_021303; NM_001369270
RefSeq (protein)	NP_056473	n/a
Location (UCSC)	Chr 1: 0.94 – 0.96 Mb	Chr 4: 156.32 – 156.33 Mb
PubMed search
- Wikidata
View/Edit Human	View/Edit Mouse

Nucleolar complex protein 2 homolog is a protein that in humans is encoded by the NOC2L gene.
