= Zinc finger protein 648 =

Protein found in humans

ZNF648

Identifiers
- Aliases: ZNF648, zinc finger protein 648
- External IDs: MGI: 2685049; GeneCards: ZNF648

Gene location (Human)
Chr.	Chromosome 1 (human)
Band	1q25.3	Start	182,054,570 bp
Band	1q25.3	End	182,061,712 bp

Gene location (Mouse)
Chr.	Chromosome 1 (mouse)
Band	1|1 G3	Start	154,076,933 bp
Band	1|1 G3	End	154,081,435 bp
RNA expression pattern
Bgee	Human / Mouse (ortholog); Top expressed in: testicle; gonad; liver; olfactory zone of nasal mucosa; right lobe of liver; ovary; left ovary; anterior pituitary; right ovary; fundus / Top expressed in: primary visual cortex; right kidney; superior frontal gyrus; hippocampus proper; human kidney; neural tube; olfactory bulb; rhombencephalon; limb; esophagus; More reference expression data
BioGPS	n/a
Gene ontology
Molecular function	DNA binding; metal ion binding; nucleic acid binding; DNA-binding transcription factor activity, RNA polymerase II-specific; DNA-binding transcription factor activity
Cellular component	nucleus
Biological process	regulation of transcription, DNA-templated; transcription, DNA-templated; regulation of transcription by RNA polymerase II
Sources:Amigo / QuickGO
Orthologs
Databases	NCBI: entry; OMA: entry
Species	Human	Mouse
Entrez	127665	100503355
Ensembl	ENSG00000179930	ENSMUSG00000066797
UniProt	Q5T619	D3Z0W3
RefSeq (mRNA)	NM_001009992	NM_001204908
RefSeq (protein)	NP_001009992	NP_001191837
Location (UCSC)	Chr 1: 182.05 – 182.06 Mb	Chr 1: 154.08 – 154.08 Mb
PubMed search
- Wikidata
View/Edit Human	View/Edit Mouse

Zinc finger protein 648 is a protein that in humans is encoded by the ZNF648 gene.
