= LSP1P5 =

Protein-coding gene in humans

Identifiers
- Aliases: LSP1P5, lymphocyte specific protein 1 pseudogene, LSP1 pseudogene 5
- External IDs: GeneCards: LSP1P5

Gene location (Human)
Chr.	Chromosome 1 (human)
Band	1q21.1	Start	144,716,062 bp
Band	1q21.1	End	144,758,298 bp
Orthologs
Databases	NCBI: entry; OMA: entry
Species	Human	Mouse
Entrez	645166	n/a
Ensembl	ENSG00000288905	n/a
UniProt	n a	n/a
RefSeq (mRNA)	n/a	n/a
RefSeq (protein)	n/a	n/a
Location (UCSC)	Chr 1: 144.72 – 144.76 Mb	n/a
PubMed search		n/a
- Wikidata
View/Edit Human

Lymphocyte-specific protein 1 pseudogene is a protein that in humans is encoded by the LSP1P5 gene.
