= GPR37L1 =

Protein-coding gene in humans

Identifiers
- Aliases: GPR37L1, ET(B)R-LP-2, ETBR-LP-2, G protein-coupled receptor 37 like 1, ETBRLP2
- External IDs: OMIM: 617630; MGI: 1928503; GeneCards: GPR37L1

Gene location (Human)
Chr.	Chromosome 1 (human)
Band	1q32.1	Start	202,122,886 bp
Band	1q32.1	End	202,133,592 bp

Gene location (Mouse)
Chr.	Chromosome 1 (mouse)
Band	1|1 E4	Start	135,087,972 bp
Band	1|1 E4	End	135,095,419 bp
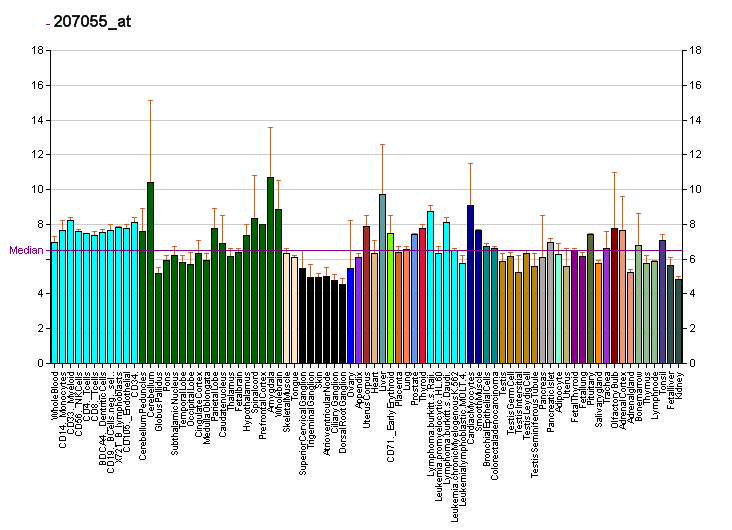
RNA expression pattern
Bgee	Human / Mouse (ortholog); Top expressed in: buccal mucosa cell; caudate nucleus; internal globus pallidus; amygdala; putamen; right frontal lobe; nucleus accumbens; endothelial cell; primary visual cortex; C1 segment / Top expressed in: lobe of cerebellum; cerebellar vermis; deep cerebellar nuclei; dorsal tegmental nucleus; medulla oblongata; superior colliculus; globus pallidus; medial vestibular nucleus; inferior colliculi; optic nerve; More reference expression data
BioGPS	More reference expression data
Gene ontology
Molecular function	peptide binding; G protein-coupled peptide receptor activity; protein binding; G protein-coupled receptor activity; signal transducer activity; prosaposin receptor activity
Cellular component	integral component of membrane; plasma membrane; receptor complex; membrane; cell projection; ciliary membrane
Biological process	positive regulation of cerebellar granule cell precursor proliferation; negative regulation of astrocyte differentiation; negative regulation of hydrogen peroxide-induced cell death; adenylate cyclase-inhibiting G protein-coupled receptor signaling pathway; negative regulation of neuron differentiation; negative regulation of smoothened signaling pathway; positive regulation of MAPK cascade; signal transduction; G protein-coupled receptor signaling pathway; negative regulation of systemic arterial blood pressure
Sources:Amigo / QuickGO
Orthologs
Databases	NCBI: entry; OMA: entry
Species	Human	Mouse
Entrez	9283	171469
Ensembl	ENSG00000170075	ENSMUSG00000026424
UniProt	O60883	Q99JG2
RefSeq (mRNA)	NM_004767	NM_134438
RefSeq (protein)	NP_004758	NP_602320
Location (UCSC)	Chr 1: 202.12 – 202.13 Mb	Chr 1: 135.09 – 135.1 Mb
PubMed search
- Wikidata
View/Edit Human	View/Edit Mouse

Endothelin B receptor-like protein 2 is a protein that in humans is encoded by the GPR37L1 gene.
