= RN5S1@ =

Gene in the species Homo sapiens

Identifiers
- Aliases: RN5S1@, RN5S, RNA, 5S ribosomal 1q42 cluster
- External IDs: GeneCards: RN5S1@; OMA:RN5S1@ - orthologs
Orthologs
Species	Human	Mouse
Entrez	6025	n/a
Ensembl	n/a	n/a
UniProt	n a	n/a
RefSeq (mRNA)	n/a	n/a
RefSeq (protein)	n/a	n/a
Location (UCSC)	n/a	n/a
PubMed search		n/a
- Wikidata
View/Edit Human

RNA, 5S cluster 1, also known as RN5S1@, is a human gene encoding the 5S subunit of ribosomal RNA.
