= Ptgs2 antisense nfkb1 complex-mediated expression regulator rna =

Non-coding RNA in the species Homo sapiens

PACERR

Identifiers
- Aliases: PACERR, PACER, PTGS2-AS1, PTGS2 antisense NFKB1 complex-mediated expression regulator RNA, PTGS2AS1
- External IDs: OMIM: 617650; GeneCards: PACERR; OMA:PACERR - orthologs
Orthologs
Species	Human	Mouse
Entrez	103752588	n/a
Ensembl	ENSG00000273129	n/a
UniProt	n a	n/a
RefSeq (mRNA)	n/a	n/a
RefSeq (protein)	n/a	n/a
Location (UCSC)	n/a	n/a
PubMed search		n/a
- Wikidata
View/Edit Human

PTGS2 antisense NFKB1 complex-mediated expression regulator RNA is a protein that in humans is encoded by the PACERR gene.

== Function ==
This gene represents transcription of a long non-coding RNA produced in antisense to the prostaglandin-endoperoxide synthase 2 (PTGS2) gene. This transcript interacts with NF-κB transcriptional regulators to promote expression of PTGS2.
