= FRA1J =

Gene in the species Homo sapiens

Identifiers
- Aliases: FRA1J, fragile site, 5-azacytidine type, common, fra(1)(q12)
- External IDs: GeneCards: FRA1J; OMA:FRA1J - orthologs
Orthologs
Species	Human	Mouse
Entrez	2369	n/a
Ensembl	n/a	n/a
UniProt	n a	n/a
RefSeq (mRNA)	n/a	n/a
RefSeq (protein)	n/a	n/a
Location (UCSC)	n/a	n/a
PubMed search		n/a
- Wikidata
View/Edit Human

Fragile site, 5-azacytidine type, common, fra(1)(q12) is a protein that in humans is encoded by the FRA1J gene.
