= Chromatin target of PRMT1 =

Protein found in humans

An Error has occurred retrieving Wikidata item for infobox Chromatin target of PRMT1 is a protein that in humans is encoded by the CHTOP gene.

== Function ==
This gene encodes a small nuclear protein that is characterized by an arginine and glycine rich region. The encoded protein may be involved in cell cycle progression. This protein interacts with protein arginine methyltransferases and plays a role in the activation of estradiol-dependent transcription. Alternate splicing results in multiple transcript variants.
