= TRE-CTC1-5 =

Non-coding RNA found in humans

Identifiers
- Aliases: TRE-CTC1-5, TRNAE5, transfer RNA-Glu (CTC) 1-5, tRNA-Glu (CTC) 1-5, tRNA-Glu (anticodon CTC) 1-5
- External IDs: GeneCards: TRE-CTC1-5
Orthologs
Databases	NCBI: entry
Species	Human	Mouse
Entrez	100189017	n/a
Ensembl	n/a	n/a
UniProt	n a	n/a
RefSeq (mRNA)	n/a	n/a
RefSeq (protein)	n/a	n/a
Location (UCSC)	n/a	n/a
PubMed search		n/a
- Wikidata
View/Edit Human

Transfer RNA-Glu (CTC) 1-5 is a non-coding RNA that in humans is encoded by the TRE-CTC1-5 gene. It functions as a transfer RNA.
