= LOC100132287 =

Non-coding RNA in the species Homo sapiens

Identifiers
- Aliases: uncharacterized LOC100132287
- External IDs: GeneCards:
Orthologs
Databases	NCBI: entry
Species	Human	Mouse
Entrez	100132287	n/a
Ensembl	n/a	n/a
UniProt	n a	n/a
RefSeq (mRNA)	n/a	n/a
RefSeq (protein)	n/a	n/a
Location (UCSC)	n/a	n/a
PubMed search		n/a
- Wikidata
View/Edit Human

Uncharacterized LOC100132287 is a putative non-coding RNA that in humans is encoded by the LOC100132287 gene.
