= Hair, curly =

Protein found in humans

HRM2

Identifiers
- Aliases: haircurly
- External IDs: GeneCards:
Orthologs
Databases	NCBI: entry
Species	Human	Mouse
Entrez	100379199	n/a
Ensembl	n/a	n/a
UniProt	n a	n/a
RefSeq (mRNA)	n/a	n/a
RefSeq (protein)	n/a	n/a
Location (UCSC)	n/a	n/a
PubMed search		n/a
- Wikidata
View/Edit Human

Hair, curly is a protein that in humans is encoded by the HRM2 gene.
