= NDUFA4P1 =

Pseudogene in the species Homo sapiens

Identifiers
- Aliases: NDUFA4P1, NDUFA4, NADH dehydrogenase (ubiquinone) 1 alpha subcomplex, 4, 9kDa, pseudogene 1, NDUFA4, mitochondrial complex associated pseudogene 1, NDUFA4 pseudogene 1
- External IDs: GeneCards: NDUFA4P1; OMA:NDUFA4P1 - orthologs
Orthologs
Species	Human	Mouse
Entrez	360165	n/a
Ensembl	n/a	n/a
UniProt	n a	n/a
RefSeq (mRNA)	n/a	n/a
RefSeq (protein)	n/a	n/a
Location (UCSC)	n/a	n/a
PubMed search		n/a
- Wikidata
View/Edit Human

NADH dehydrogenase (ubiquinone) 1 alpha subcomplex, 4, 9kDa, pseudogene 1 is a protein that in humans is encoded by the NDUFA4P1 gene.
