= ACTG1P6 =

Pseudogene in the species Homo sapiens

Identifiers
- Aliases: ACTG1P6, ACTGP6, actin gamma 1 pseudogene 6
- External IDs: GeneCards: ACTG1P6; OMA:ACTG1P6 - orthologs
Orthologs
| Species | Human | Mouse |
| Entrez | 78 | n/a |
| Ensembl | n/a | n/a |
| UniProt | n a | n/a |
| RefSeq (mRNA) | n/a | n/a |
| RefSeq (protein) | n/a | n/a |
| Location (UCSC) | n/a | n/a |
| PubMed search | | n/a |
- Wikidata
| View/Edit Human |

ACTG1P6 (Actin, gamma 1 pseudogene 6) is a non-functional, processed pseudogene related to the ACTG1 gene, which encodes gamma-actin, a protein involved in cytoskeletal structure and cellular motility in humans.
