= CRYZL1 =

Protein-coding gene in the species Homo sapiens

Identifiers
- Aliases: CRYZL1, 4P11, QOH-1, crystallin zeta like 1
- External IDs: OMIM: 603920; MGI: 1913859; HomoloGene: 3749; GeneCards: CRYZL1; OMA:CRYZL1 - orthologs

Gene location (Human)
Chr.	Chromosome 21 (human)
Band	21q22.11	Start	33,589,341 bp
Band	21q22.11	End	33,643,926 bp

Gene location (Mouse)
Chr.	Chromosome 16 (mouse)
Band	16|16 C4	Start	91,486,210 bp
Band	16|16 C4	End	91,525,863 bp
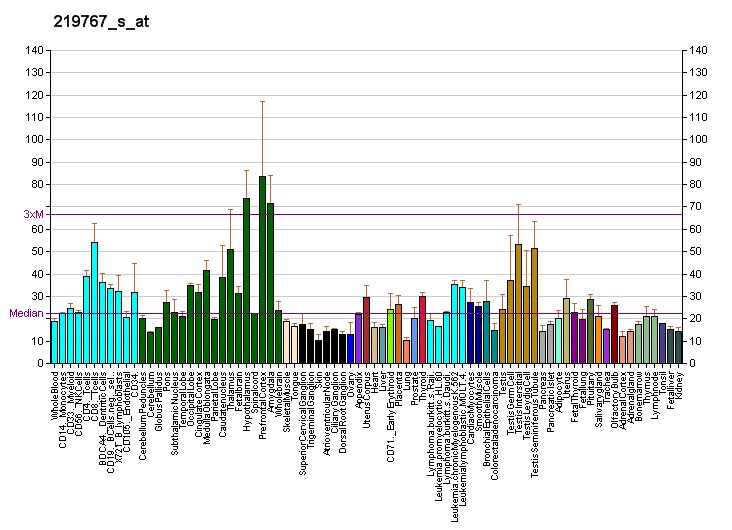
RNA expression pattern
Bgee	Human / Mouse (ortholog); Top expressed in: ganglionic eminence; gastric mucosa; popliteal artery; tibial arteries; muscle layer of sigmoid colon; ventricular zone; Descending thoracic aorta; anterior cingulate cortex; left ovary; amygdala / Top expressed in: sciatic nerve; dentate gyrus of hippocampal formation granule cell; Region I of hippocampus proper; superior frontal gyrus; medial ganglionic eminence; cerebellar cortex; renal corpuscle; primary visual cortex; Paneth cell; epithelium of lens; More reference expression data
BioGPS	More reference expression data
Gene ontology
Molecular function	oxidoreductase activity; NADP binding; NADPH:quinone reductase activity
Cellular component	cytosol
Biological process	quinone metabolic process
Sources:Amigo / QuickGO
Orthologs
Species	Human	Mouse
Entrez	9946	66609
Ensembl	ENSG00000205758	ENSMUSG00000058240
UniProt	O95825	Q921W4
RefSeq (mRNA)	NM_145858; NM_145311	NM_026994; NM_133679
RefSeq (protein)	NP_665857	NP_081270; NP_598440
Location (UCSC)	Chr 21: 33.59 – 33.64 Mb	Chr 16: 91.49 – 91.53 Mb
PubMed search
- Wikidata
View/Edit Human	View/Edit Mouse

Quinone oxidoreductase-like protein 1 is an enzyme that in humans is encoded by the CRYZL1 gene.

This gene encodes a protein that has sequence similarity to zeta crystallin, also known as quinone oxidoreductase. This zeta crystallin-like protein also contains an NAD(P)H binding site. Alternatively spliced transcript variants have been observed but their full-length nature has not been completely determined.
