= DIP2A =

Protein-coding gene in the species Homo sapiens

Identifiers
- Aliases: DIP2A, C21orf106, DIP2, disco interacting protein 2 homolog A
- External IDs: OMIM: 607711; MGI: 2385920; HomoloGene: 41012; GeneCards: DIP2A; OMA:DIP2A - orthologs

Gene location (Human)
Chr.	Chromosome 21 (human)
Band	21q22.3	Start	46,458,891 bp
Band	21q22.3	End	46,570,015 bp

Gene location (Mouse)
Chr.	Chromosome 10 (mouse)
Band	10 C1|10 38.76 cM	Start	76,095,263 bp
Band	10 C1|10 38.76 cM	End	76,181,125 bp
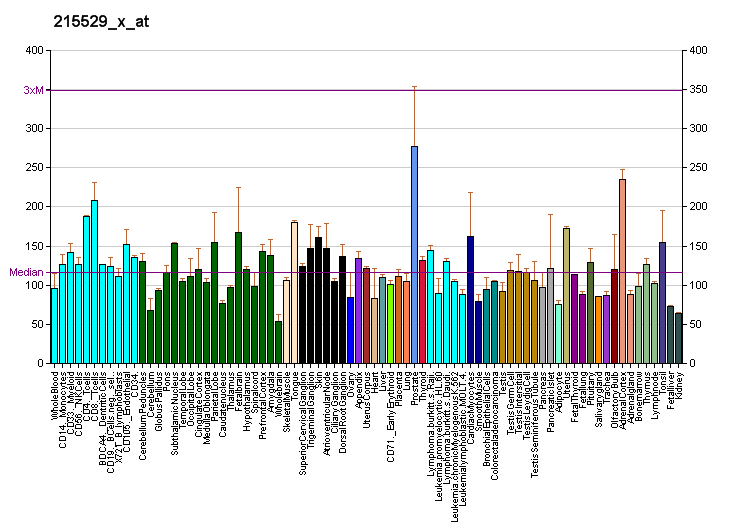
RNA expression pattern
Bgee	Human / Mouse (ortholog); Top expressed in: visceral pleura; parietal pleura; tibia; cardia; ventral tegmental area; renal medulla; inferior ganglion of vagus nerve; nipple; sperm; endothelial cell / Top expressed in: substantia nigra; deep cerebellar nuclei; otolith organ; utricle; iris; anterior horn of spinal cord; nucleus of stria terminalis; trigeminal ganglion; pontine nuclei; central gray substance of midbrain; More reference expression data
BioGPS	More reference expression data
Gene ontology
Molecular function	catalytic activity; protein binding
Cellular component	nucleus; cell surface
Biological process	multicellular organism development; negative regulation of gene expression; metabolism; regulation of apoptotic process
Sources:Amigo / QuickGO
Orthologs
Species	Human	Mouse
Entrez	23181	64451
Ensembl	ENSG00000160305	ENSMUSG00000020231
UniProt	Q14689	Q8BWT5
RefSeq (mRNA)	NM_001146114; NM_001146115; NM_001146116; NM_015151; NM_206889 NM_206890; NM_206891; NM_001353942; NM_001353943; NM_001353944	NM_001081419
RefSeq (protein)	NP_001139587; NP_001139588; NP_055966; NP_996772; NP_996773 NP_996774; NP_001340871; NP_001340872; NP_001340873	NP_001074888
Location (UCSC)	Chr 21: 46.46 – 46.57 Mb	Chr 10: 76.1 – 76.18 Mb
PubMed search
- Wikidata
View/Edit Human	View/Edit Mouse

Disco-interacting protein 2 homolog A is a protein that in humans is encoded by the DIP2A gene.

== See also ==
- DIP2B
- DIP2C
