= TRAPPC10 =

Protein-coding gene in the species Homo sapiens

Identifiers
- Aliases: TRAPPC10, EHOC-1, EHOC1, GT334, TMEM1, TRS130, TRS30, trafficking protein particle complex 10, trafficking protein particle complex subunit 10
- External IDs: OMIM: 602103; MGI: 1336209; GeneCards: TRAPPC10

Gene location (Human)
Chr.	Chromosome 21 (human)
Band	21q22.3	Start	44,012,309 bp
Band	21q22.3	End	44,106,552 bp
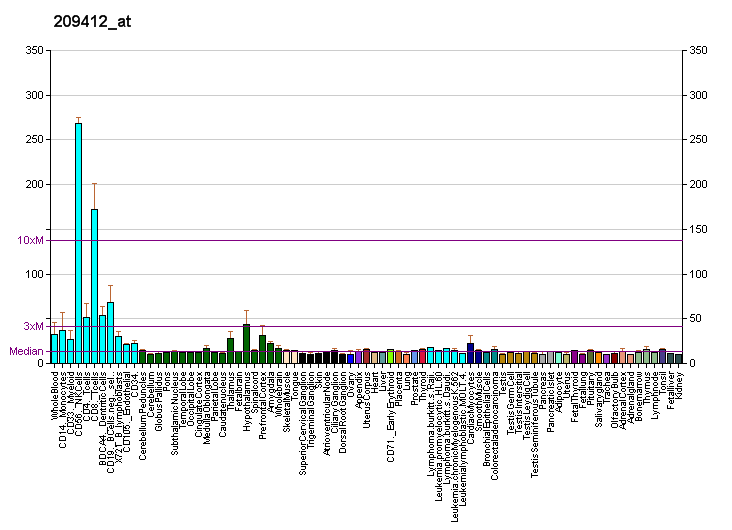

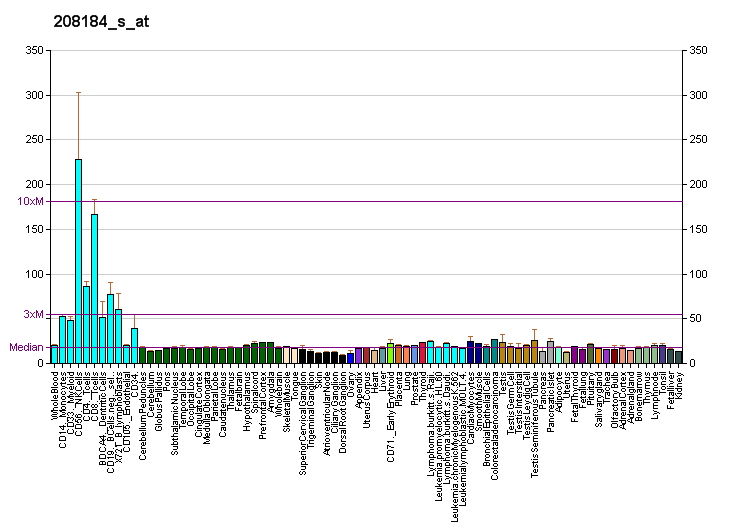
RNA expression pattern
Bgee	Human / Mouse (ortholog); Top expressed in: bone marrow cell; granulocyte; rectum; appendix; monocyte; stromal cell of endometrium; epithelium of colon; transverse colon; sural nerve; islet of Langerhans / n/a; More reference expression data
BioGPS	More reference expression data
Gene ontology
Molecular function	sodium ion transmembrane transporter activity; protein binding
Cellular component	integral component of membrane; cytosol; Golgi apparatus; TRAPPII protein complex; Golgi membrane; TRAPP complex
Biological process	early endosome to Golgi transport; COPII vesicle coating; intra-Golgi vesicle-mediated transport; vesicle-mediated transport; sodium ion transport; sodium ion transmembrane transport; protein complex oligomerization
Sources:Amigo / QuickGO
Orthologs
Databases	NCBI: entry; OMA: entry
Species	Human	Mouse
Entrez	7109	216131
Ensembl	ENSG00000160218	ENSMUSG00000000374
UniProt	P48553	Q3TLI0
RefSeq (mRNA)	NM_001001723; NM_003274; NM_001351709	NM_001081055
RefSeq (protein)	NP_003265; NP_001338638	NP_001074524
Location (UCSC)	Chr 21: 44.01 – 44.11 Mb	n/a
PubMed search
- Wikidata
View/Edit Human	View/Edit Mouse

Trafficking protein particle complex subunit 10 is a protein that in humans is encoded by the TRAPPC10 gene.

The protein encoded by this gene is a transmembrane protein found in the cis-Golgi complex. The encoded protein is part of the multisubunit transport protein particle (TRAPP) complex and may be involved in vesicular transport from the endoplasmic reticulum to the Golgi.

Mutations in this gene could be responsible for the Unverricht-Lundborg type of progressive myoclonus epilepsy, or for autoimmune polyglandular disease type 1. Two transcript variants encoding different isoforms have been found for this gene.
