= MIS18A =

Protein-coding gene in the species Homo sapiens

Identifiers
- Aliases: MIS18A, B28, C21orf45, C21orf46, FASP1, MIS18alpha, hMis18alpha, MIS18 kinetochore protein A
- External IDs: OMIM: 618137; MGI: 1913828; HomoloGene: 41294; GeneCards: MIS18A; OMA:MIS18A - orthologs

Gene location (Human)
Chr.	Chromosome 21 (human)
Band	21q22.11	Start	32,268,228 bp
Band	21q22.11	End	32,279,049 bp

Gene location (Mouse)
Chr.	Chromosome 16 (mouse)
Band	16|16 C3.3	Start	90,516,200 bp
Band	16|16 C3.3	End	90,524,292 bp
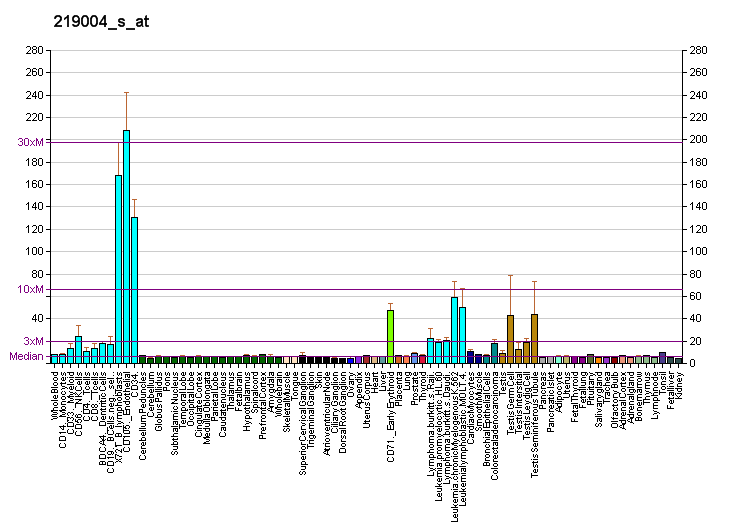
RNA expression pattern
Bgee	Human / Mouse (ortholog); Top expressed in: oocyte; secondary oocyte; gonad; ventricular zone; ganglionic eminence; testicle; right testis; left testis; buccal mucosa cell; mucosa of sigmoid colon / Top expressed in: Paneth cell; primitive streak; endocardial cushion; endothelial cell of lymphatic vessel; primary oocyte; abdominal wall; hair follicle; condyle; cumulus cell; atrioventricular junction; More reference expression data
BioGPS	More reference expression data
Gene ontology
Molecular function	protein binding; metal ion binding
Cellular component	chromosome; nucleoplasm; chromosome, centromeric region; nucleus; chromatin; cytosol
Biological process	cell division; regulation of DNA methylation; cell cycle; chromosome segregation; CENP-A containing chromatin assembly
Sources:Amigo / QuickGO
Orthologs
Species	Human	Mouse
Entrez	54069	66578
Ensembl	ENSG00000159055	ENSMUSG00000022978
UniProt	Q9NYP9	Q9CZJ6
RefSeq (mRNA)	NM_018944	NM_025642
RefSeq (protein)	NP_061817	NP_079918
Location (UCSC)	Chr 21: 32.27 – 32.28 Mb	Chr 16: 90.52 – 90.52 Mb
PubMed search
- Wikidata
View/Edit Human	View/Edit Mouse

Protein Mis18-alpha is a protein that in humans is encoded by the MIS18A gene.
