= Leucine rich repeat containing 3 =

Protein-coding gene in the species Homo sapiens

LRRC3

Identifiers
- Aliases: LRRC3, C21orf102, leucine rich repeat containing 3, LRRC3DN, C21orf30
- External IDs: OMIM: 617620; MGI: 2447899; HomoloGene: 12789; GeneCards: LRRC3; OMA:LRRC3 - orthologs

Gene location (Human)
Chr.	Chromosome 21 (human)
Band	21q22.3	Start	44,455,510 bp
Band	21q22.3	End	44,462,196 bp

Gene location (Mouse)
Chr.	Chromosome 10 (mouse)
Band	10|10 C1	Start	77,733,409 bp
Band	10|10 C1	End	77,738,370 bp
RNA expression pattern
Bgee	Human / Mouse (ortholog); Top expressed in: right lobe of liver; ganglionic eminence; muscle layer of sigmoid colon; ventricular zone; testicle; Descending thoracic aorta; ascending aorta; gastric mucosa; apex of heart; fundus / Top expressed in: lumbar spinal ganglion; left lobe of liver; internal carotid artery; external carotid artery; urethra; supraoptic nucleus; right kidney; substantia nigra; yolk sac; proximal tubule; More reference expression data
BioGPS	n/a
Gene ontology
Molecular function	protein binding; protein kinase inhibitor activity
Cellular component	membrane; integral component of membrane; cytoplasm
Biological process	negative regulation of protein kinase activity; cytokine-mediated signaling pathway; negative regulation of receptor signaling pathway via JAK-STAT
Sources:Amigo / QuickGO
Orthologs
Species	Human	Mouse
Entrez	81543	237387
Ensembl	ENSG00000160233	ENSMUSG00000051652
UniProt	Q9BY71	P59034
RefSeq (mRNA)	NM_030891	NM_145152
RefSeq (protein)	NP_112153	NP_660134
Location (UCSC)	Chr 21: 44.46 – 44.46 Mb	Chr 10: 77.73 – 77.74 Mb
PubMed search
- Wikidata
View/Edit Human	View/Edit Mouse

Leucine rich repeat containing 3 is a protein that in humans is encoded by the LRRC3 gene.

== See also ==
- Leucine rich repeat
