= UBASH3A =

Protein-coding gene in the species Homo sapiens

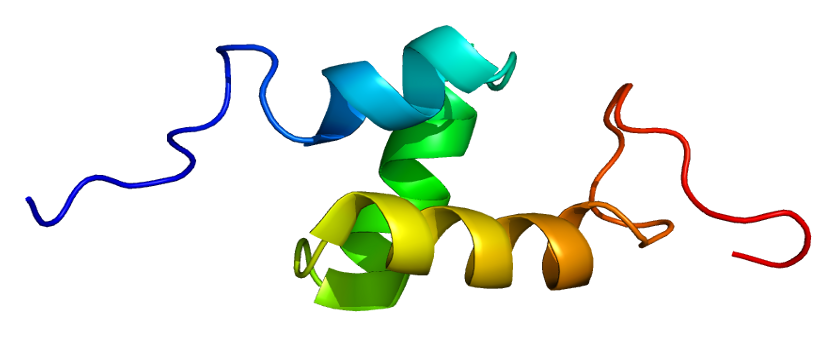

Identifiers
- Aliases: UBASH3A, CLIP4, STS-2, TULA, TULA-1, ubiquitin associated and SH3 domain containing A
- External IDs: OMIM: 605736; MGI: 1926074; GeneCards: UBASH3A
Available structures
PDB	Ortholog search: PDBe RCSB
PDB	List of PDB id codes 2CRN

Gene location (Human)
Chr.	Chromosome 21 (human)
Band	21q22.3	Start	42,403,447 bp
Band	21q22.3	End	42,447,684 bp

Gene location (Mouse)
Chr.	Chromosome 17 (mouse)
Band	17|17 A3.3- B1	Start	31,426,847 bp
Band	17|17 A3.3- B1	End	31,465,866 bp
RNA expression pattern
Bgee	Human / Mouse (ortholog); Top expressed in: granulocyte; blood; lymph node; testicle; thymus; spleen; appendix; gallbladder; rectum; tonsil / Top expressed in: thymus; mesenteric lymph nodes; granulocyte; blood; embryo; yolk sac; parasympathetic nervous system; thyroid gland; pharynx; tongue; More reference expression data
BioGPS	n/a
Gene ontology
Molecular function	protein binding; phosphatase activity
Cellular component	cytoplasm; cytosol; extracellular exosome; nucleus; nucleoplasm; Golgi apparatus
Biological process	regulation of cytokine production; negative regulation of T cell receptor signaling pathway; negative regulation of signal transduction; dephosphorylation
Sources:Amigo / QuickGO
Orthologs
Databases	NCBI: entry; OMA: entry
Species	Human	Mouse
Entrez	53347	328795
Ensembl	ENSG00000160185	ENSMUSG00000042345
UniProt	P57075	Q3V3E1
RefSeq (mRNA)	NM_001001895; NM_001243467; NM_018961	NM_177823
RefSeq (protein)	NP_001001895; NP_001230396; NP_061834	NP_808491
Location (UCSC)	Chr 21: 42.4 – 42.45 Mb	Chr 17: 31.43 – 31.47 Mb
PubMed search
- Wikidata
View/Edit Human	View/Edit Mouse

Ubiquitin-associated and SH3 domain-containing protein A is a protein that in humans is encoded by the UBASH3A gene.
