= HSPA13 =

Protein-coding gene in the species Homo sapiens

Identifiers
- Aliases: HSPA13, STCH, heat shock protein family A (Hsp70) member 13
- External IDs: OMIM: 601100; MGI: 1309463; GeneCards: HSPA13

Gene location (Human)
Chr.	Chromosome 21 (human)
Band	21q11.2	Start	14,371,115 bp
Band	21q11.2	End	14,383,484 bp

Gene location (Mouse)
Chr.	Chromosome 16 (mouse)
Band	16 C3.1|16 43.36 cM	Start	75,542,319 bp
Band	16 C3.1|16 43.36 cM	End	75,563,992 bp
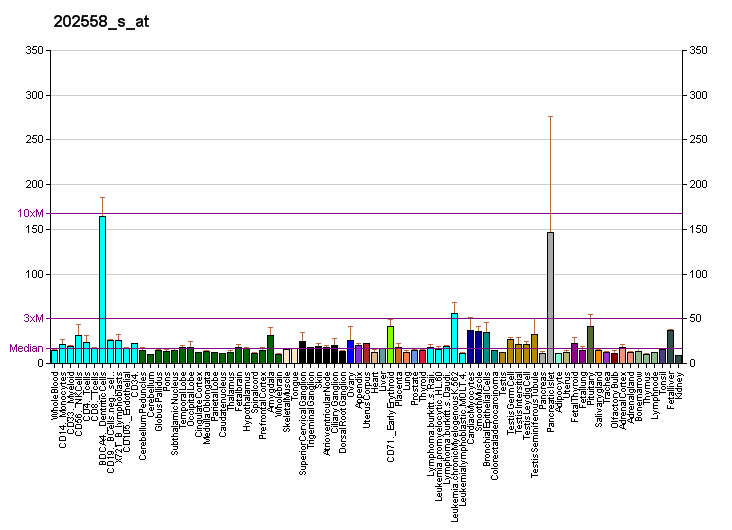

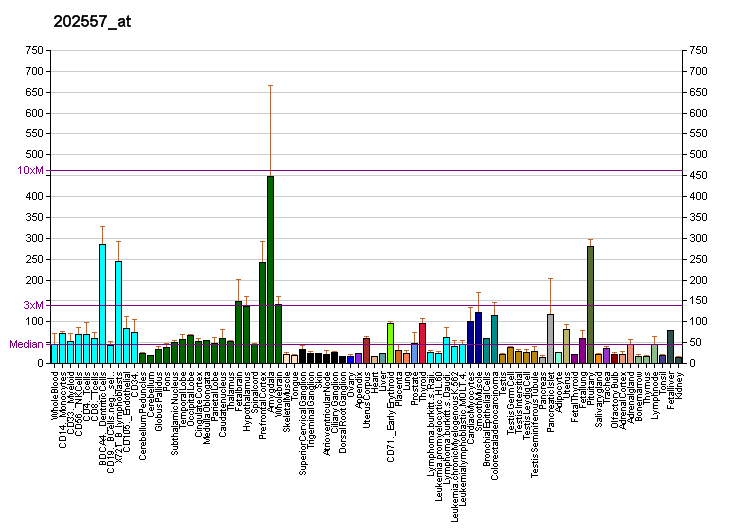
RNA expression pattern
Bgee	Human / Mouse (ortholog); Top expressed in: ventricular zone; cartilage tissue; islet of Langerhans; ganglionic eminence; endothelial cell; corpus epididymis; retinal pigment epithelium; beta cell; caput epididymis; orbitofrontal cortex / Top expressed in: hand; lacrimal gland; seminal vesicula; superior cervical ganglion; otolith organ; arcuate nucleus; median eminence; utricle; cumulus cell; dermis; More reference expression data
BioGPS	More reference expression data
Gene ontology
Molecular function	nucleotide binding; protein binding; ATP binding; ATPase activity; heat shock protein binding; protein folding chaperone activity; unfolded protein binding; misfolded protein binding
Cellular component	extracellular exosome; endoplasmic reticulum; intracellular membrane-bounded organelle; nucleus; cytoplasm; endoplasmic reticulum lumen; membrane; endoplasmic reticulum chaperone complex
Biological process	response to unfolded protein; ubiquitin-dependent ERAD pathway; endoplasmic reticulum unfolded protein response; cellular response to heat; Unfolded Protein Response; protein refolding; chaperone cofactor-dependent protein refolding
Sources:Amigo / QuickGO
Orthologs
Databases	NCBI: entry; OMA: entry
Species	Human	Mouse
Entrez	6782	110920
Ensembl	ENSG00000155304	ENSMUSG00000032932
UniProt	P48723	Q8BM72
RefSeq (mRNA)	NM_006948	NM_030201
RefSeq (protein)	NP_008879	NP_084477
Location (UCSC)	Chr 21: 14.37 – 14.38 Mb	Chr 16: 75.54 – 75.56 Mb
PubMed search
- Wikidata
View/Edit Human	View/Edit Mouse

Heat shock 70 kDa protein 13 is a protein that in humans is encoded by the HSPA13 gene.

The protein encoded by this gene is a member of the heat shock protein 70 family and is found associated with endoplasmic reticulum. Members of this protein family play a role in the processing of cytosolic and secretory proteins, as well as in the removal of denatured or incorrectly folded proteins. The encoded protein contains an ATPase domain and has been shown to associate with a ubiquitin-like protein.
