= PAXBP1 =

Protein-coding gene in the species Homo sapiens

Identifiers
- Aliases: PAXBP1, BM020, C21orf66, FSAP105, GCFC, GCFC1, PAX3 and PAX7 binding protein 1
- External IDs: OMIM: 617621; MGI: 1914617; HomoloGene: 9604; GeneCards: PAXBP1; OMA:PAXBP1 - orthologs

Gene location (Human)
Chr.	Chromosome 21 (human)
Band	21q22.11	Start	32,733,899 bp
Band	21q22.11	End	32,771,792 bp

Gene location (Mouse)
Chr.	Chromosome 16 (mouse)
Band	16|16 C3.3	Start	90,810,925 bp
Band	16|16 C3.3	End	90,841,431 bp
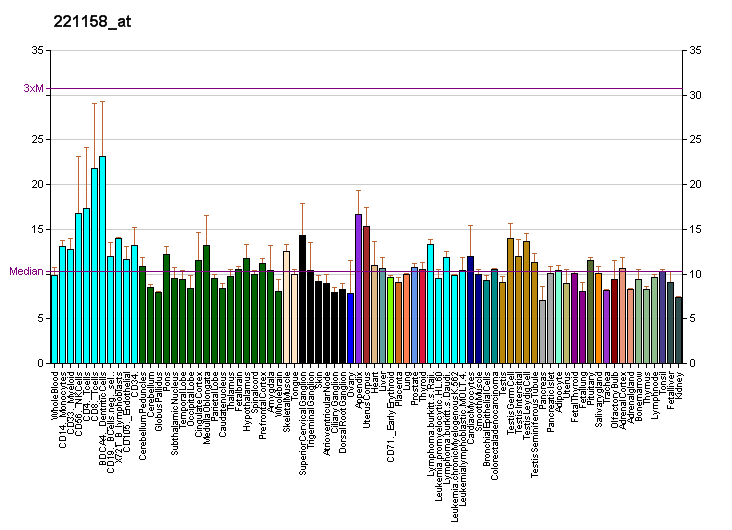

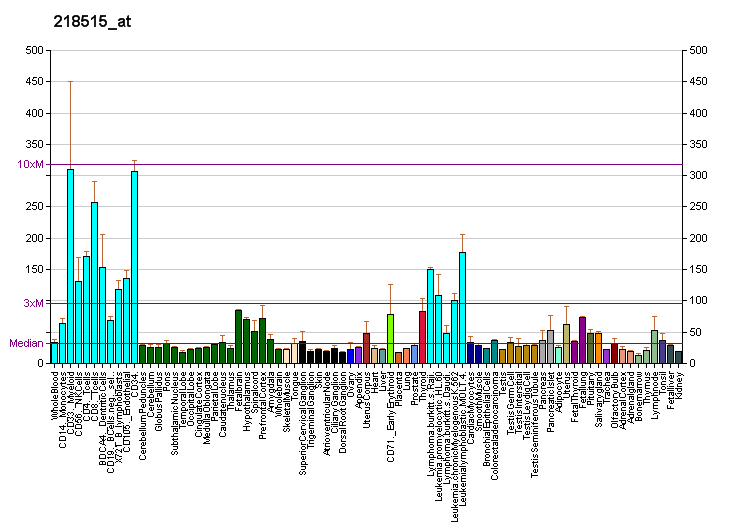
RNA expression pattern
Bgee	Human / Mouse (ortholog); Top expressed in: sural nerve; sperm; right uterine tube; left ovary; Achilles tendon; tibia; right ovary; ventricular zone; corpus callosum; right hemisphere of cerebellum / Top expressed in: cerebellar cortex; lobe of cerebellum; Ileal epithelium; cerebellar vermis; genital tubercle; neural layer of retina; thymus; dermis; ventricular zone; tail of embryo; More reference expression data
BioGPS	More reference expression data
Gene ontology
Molecular function	RNA polymerase II cis-regulatory region sequence-specific DNA binding; transcription factor binding; DNA-binding transcription factor activity; DNA-binding transcription repressor activity, RNA polymerase II-specific; DNA binding
Cellular component	nucleus; cytosol
Biological process	positive regulation of transcription by RNA polymerase II; regulation of skeletal muscle satellite cell proliferation; regulation of transcription, DNA-templated; muscle organ development; positive regulation of myoblast proliferation; positive regulation of histone methylation; transcription, DNA-templated; negative regulation of transcription by RNA polymerase II
Sources:Amigo / QuickGO
Orthologs
Species	Human	Mouse
Entrez	94104	67367
Ensembl	ENSG00000159086; ENSG00000263141	ENSMUSG00000022974
UniProt	Q9Y5B6	P58501
RefSeq (mRNA)	NM_013329; NM_016631; NM_058191; NM_145328	NM_026110
RefSeq (protein)	NP_037461; NP_057715	NP_080386
Location (UCSC)	Chr 21: 32.73 – 32.77 Mb	Chr 16: 90.81 – 90.84 Mb
PubMed search
- Wikidata
View/Edit Human	View/Edit Mouse

GC-rich sequence DNA-binding factor homolog is a protein that in humans is encoded by the PAXBP1 gene.

Similarity to a transcriptional repressor suggests that this gene's protein product is involved in the regulation of transcription. Alternative splicing of this gene results in three transcript variants encoding different isoforms. Additional transcript variants have been described, but their full-length sequences have not been determined.
