= PSMG1 =

Protein found in humans

Identifiers
- Aliases: PSMG1, C21LRP, DSCR2, LRPC21, PAC-1, PAC1, proteasome assembly chaperone 1
- External IDs: OMIM: 605296; MGI: 1860263; HomoloGene: 2759; GeneCards: PSMG1; OMA:PSMG1 - orthologs

Gene location (Human)
Chr.	Chromosome 21 (human)
Band	21q22.2	Start	39,174,769 bp
Band	21q22.2	End	39,183,488 bp

Gene location (Mouse)
Chr.	Chromosome 16 (mouse)
Band	16|16 C4	Start	95,781,133 bp
Band	16|16 C4	End	95,792,160 bp
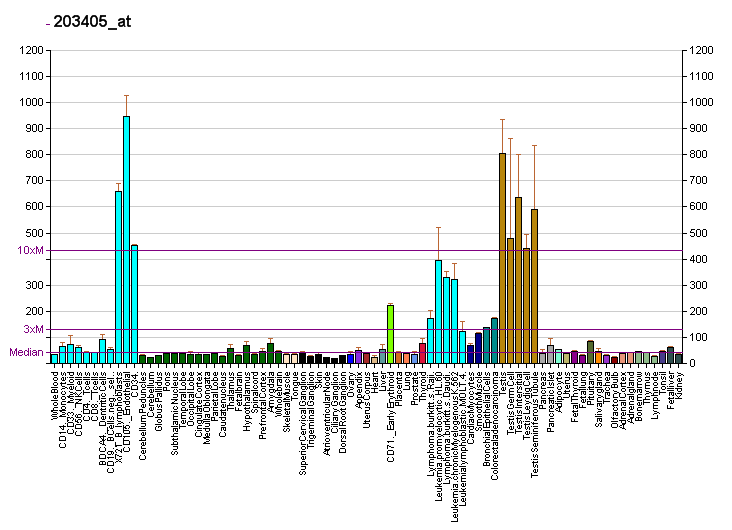
RNA expression pattern
Bgee	Human / Mouse (ortholog); Top expressed in: left testis; right testis; gonad; rectum; endometrium; mucosa of transverse colon; body of pancreas; mucosa of esophagus; right adrenal gland; right adrenal cortex / Top expressed in: otic placode; saccule; otic vesicle; primitive streak; epiblast; embryo; endocardial cushion; embryo; abdominal wall; left lobe of liver; More reference expression data
BioGPS	More reference expression data
Gene ontology
Molecular function	protein binding; proteasome binding
Cellular component	cytoplasm; Golgi apparatus; endoplasmic reticulum; nucleus; nucleoplasm; cytosol
Biological process	cerebellar granule cell precursor proliferation; proteasome assembly; proteasome core complex assembly
Sources:Amigo / QuickGO
Orthologs
Species	Human	Mouse
Entrez	8624	56088
Ensembl	ENSG00000183527	ENSMUSG00000022913
UniProt	O95456	Q9JK23
RefSeq (mRNA)	NM_001261824; NM_003720; NM_203433; NM_001320795	NM_019537
RefSeq (protein)	NP_001248753; NP_001307724; NP_003711; NP_982257	NP_062410
Location (UCSC)	Chr 21: 39.17 – 39.18 Mb	Chr 16: 95.78 – 95.79 Mb
PubMed search
- Wikidata
View/Edit Human	View/Edit Mouse

Proteasome assembly chaperone 1 is a protein that in humans is encoded by the PSMG1 gene.

== See also ==
- Proteasome
- Chaperone
