= ZBTB21 =

Protein-coding gene in the species Homo sapiens

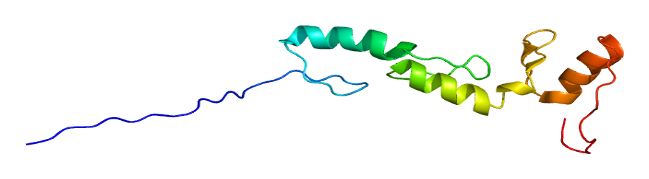

Identifiers
- Aliases: ZBTB21, ZNF295, zinc finger and BTB domain containing 21
- External IDs: OMIM: 616485; MGI: 1927240; GeneCards: ZBTB21
Available structures
PDB	Human UniProt search: PDBe RCSB
PDB	List of PDB id codes 1WJP

Gene location (Human)
Chr.	Chromosome 21 (human)
Band	21q22.3	Start	41,986,831 bp
Band	21q22.3	End	42,010,387 bp

Gene location (Mouse)
Chr.	Chromosome 16 (mouse)
Band	16|16 C4	Start	97,744,557 bp
Band	16|16 C4	End	97,763,822 bp
RNA expression pattern
Bgee	Human / Mouse (ortholog); Top expressed in: tail of epididymis; endothelial cell; pancreatic epithelial cell; corpus epididymis; secondary oocyte; caput epididymis; Brodmann area 23; cartilage tissue; mucosa of paranasal sinus; Achilles tendon / Top expressed in: lumbar spinal ganglion; zygote; secondary oocyte; primary oocyte; tail of embryo; yolk sac; Rostral migratory stream; Paneth cell; spermatocyte; otic vesicle; More reference expression data
BioGPS	n/a
Gene ontology
Molecular function	methyl-CpG binding; DNA binding; protein binding; metal ion binding; nucleic acid binding; DNA-binding transcription factor activity, RNA polymerase II-specific
Cellular component	nucleus; nucleoplasm; cytosol
Biological process	negative regulation of transcription, DNA-templated; regulation of transcription, DNA-templated; transcription, DNA-templated; regulation of transcription by RNA polymerase II
Sources:Amigo / QuickGO
Orthologs
Databases	NCBI: entry; OMA: entry
Species	Human	Mouse
Entrez	49854	114565
Ensembl	ENSG00000173276	ENSMUSG00000046962
UniProt	Q9ULJ3	n/a
RefSeq (mRNA)	NM_001098402; NM_001098403; NM_020727; NM_001320729; NM_001320731	NM_001081684; NM_001081685; NM_175428; NM_001320385
RefSeq (protein)	NP_001091872; NP_001091873; NP_001307658; NP_001307660; NP_065778	n/a
Location (UCSC)	Chr 21: 41.99 – 42.01 Mb	Chr 16: 97.74 – 97.76 Mb
PubMed search
- Wikidata
View/Edit Human	View/Edit Mouse

Zinc finger and BTB domain-containing protein 21 is a protein that in humans is encoded by the ZBTB21 gene.

== See also ==
- BTB domain
- Zinc finger
