= Chromosome 21 open reading frame 91 =

Protein found in humans

C21orf91

Identifiers
- Aliases: C21orf91, C21orf14, C21orf38, CSSG1, EURL, YG81, chromosome 21 open reading frame 91
- External IDs: MGI: 1196400; GeneCards: C21orf91

Gene location (Human)
Chr.	Chromosome 21 (human)
Band	21q21.1	Start	17,788,974 bp
Band	21q21.1	End	17,819,386 bp

Gene location (Mouse)
Chr.	Chromosome 16 (mouse)
Band	16 C3.1|16 45.36 cM	Start	78,337,226 bp
Band	16 C3.1|16 45.36 cM	End	78,373,596 bp
RNA expression pattern
Bgee	Human / Mouse (ortholog); Top expressed in: sperm; inferior ganglion of vagus nerve; gingival epithelium; palpebral conjunctiva; skin of thigh; corpus callosum; parietal pleura; endothelial cell; skin of hip; subthalamic nucleus / Top expressed in: spermatid; hair follicle; Rostral migratory stream; seminiferous tubule; retinal pigment epithelium; lumbar subsegment of spinal cord; spermatocyte; ascending aorta; aortic valve; seminal vesicula; More reference expression data
BioGPS	n/a
Orthologs
Databases	NCBI: entry; OMA: entry
Species	Human	Mouse
Entrez	54149	67102
Ensembl	ENSG00000154642	ENSMUSG00000022864
UniProt	Q9NYK6	Q9D7G4
RefSeq (mRNA)	NM_017447; NM_001100420; NM_001100421	NM_001252438; NM_001252439; NM_001252440; NM_025967
RefSeq (protein)	NP_001093890; NP_001093891; NP_059143	NP_001239367; NP_001239368; NP_001239369; NP_080243
Location (UCSC)	Chr 21: 17.79 – 17.82 Mb	Chr 16: 78.34 – 78.37 Mb
PubMed search
- Wikidata
View/Edit Human	View/Edit Mouse

Chromosome 21 open reading frame 91 is a protein that in humans is encoded by the C21orf91 gene.

EURL is a structural protein gene that is encoded within the human chromosome 21. It stands for gene Expressed in Undifferentiated Retina and Lens and was first found in chick embryos. It is also known as C21orf 91 (Chromosome 21 open reading frame 91). This gene produces many molecules; among them is a protein that influences neural development. This protein-coding region helps to code for neural development in humans and is strongly associated with neural progenitor cells as well as neurons associated with the cerebral cortex of the brain.

Thus, being on chromosome 21, defects linked to this gene are heavily correlated to Down syndrome. There are some knockout models regarding other genes involved in Down Syndrome, but there seems to be primary interest in a knockdown model for this specific gene. It is believed that because there is three codes of this gene rather than two, that the higher concentration of this molecule has the implications leading to Down Syndrome. Scientists are currently working on a hypothesis that the dosage of the EURL protein is directly correlated to neural development in the embryo and how an altered dosage leads to the neural deficits seen in Down Syndrome.
