= SAM domain, SH3 domain and nuclear localization signals 1 =

Protein-coding gene in the species Homo sapiens

SAMSN1

Identifiers
- Aliases: SAMSN1, HACS1, NASH1, SASH2, SH3D6B, SLy2, SAM domain, SH3 domain and nuclear localization signals 1
- External IDs: OMIM: 607978; MGI: 1914992; GeneCards: SAMSN1
Available structures
PDB	Ortholog search: PDBe RCSB
PDB	List of PDB id codes 2KEA

Gene location (Human)
Chr.	Chromosome 21 (human)
Band	21q11.2	Start	14,485,228 bp
Band	21q11.2	End	14,658,821 bp

Gene location (Mouse)
Chr.	Chromosome 16 (mouse)
Band	16|16 C3.1	Start	75,655,681 bp
Band	16|16 C3.1	End	75,819,169 bp
RNA expression pattern
Bgee	Human / Mouse (ortholog); Top expressed in: bone marrow; appendix; bone marrow cell; monocyte; right lung; blood; spleen; lymph node; epithelium of nasopharynx; trabecular bone / Top expressed in: granulocyte; lumbar spinal ganglion; mesenteric lymph nodes; neural layer of retina; spleen; bone marrow; blood; thymus; tibiofemoral joint; fetal liver hematopoietic progenitor cell; More reference expression data
BioGPS	n/a
Gene ontology
Molecular function	phosphotyrosine residue binding; RNA binding
Cellular component	cytoplasm; ruffle; cytosol; cell projection; nucleus; plasma membrane
Biological process	negative regulation of B cell activation; negative regulation of peptidyl-tyrosine phosphorylation; negative regulation of adaptive immune response
Sources:Amigo / QuickGO
Orthologs
Databases	NCBI: entry; OMA: entry
Species	Human	Mouse
Entrez	64092	67742
Ensembl	ENSG00000155307	ENSMUSG00000022876
UniProt	Q9NSI8	P57725
RefSeq (mRNA)	NM_001256370; NM_001286523; NM_022136	NM_023380
RefSeq (protein)	NP_001243299; NP_001273452; NP_071419	NP_075869
Location (UCSC)	Chr 21: 14.49 – 14.66 Mb	Chr 16: 75.66 – 75.82 Mb
PubMed search
- Wikidata
View/Edit Human	View/Edit Mouse

SAM domain-containing protein SAMSN-1 is a protein that in humans is encoded by the SAMSN1 gene.

== Function ==
SAMSN1 is a member of a novel gene family of putative adaptors and scaffold proteins containing SH3 and SAM (sterile alpha motif) domains (Claudio et al., 2001 [PubMed 11536050]).

== See also ==
- SASH1
