= PDXK =

Protein-coding gene in the species Homo sapiens

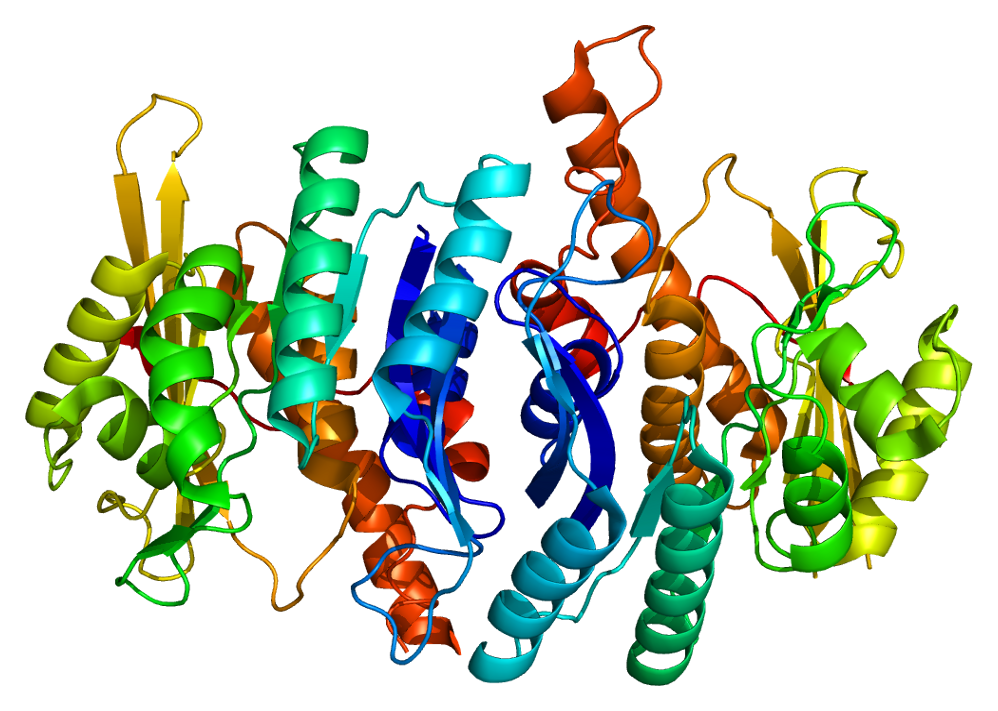

Identifiers
- Aliases: PDXK, C21orf124, C21orf97, HEL-S-1a, PKH, PNK, PRED79, pyridoxal (pyridoxine, vitamin B6) kinase, pyridoxal kinase, HMSN6C
- External IDs: OMIM: 179020; MGI: 1351869; GeneCards: PDXK
Available structures
PDB	Ortholog search: PDBe RCSB
PDB	List of PDB id codes 2AJP, 2F7K, 2YXT, 2YXU, 3FHX, 3FHY, 3KEU, 4EN4, 4EOH
Enzyme activity
EC #	BRENDA	ExPASy	KEGG	MetaCyc
2.7.1.35	↗	↗	↗	↗

Gene location (Human)
Chr.	Chromosome 21 (human)
Band	21q22.3	Start	43,719,094 bp
Band	21q22.3	End	43,762,307 bp

Gene location (Mouse)
Chr.	Chromosome 10 (mouse)
Band	10 C1|10 39.72 cM	Start	78,272,578 bp
Band	10 C1|10 39.72 cM	End	78,300,809 bp
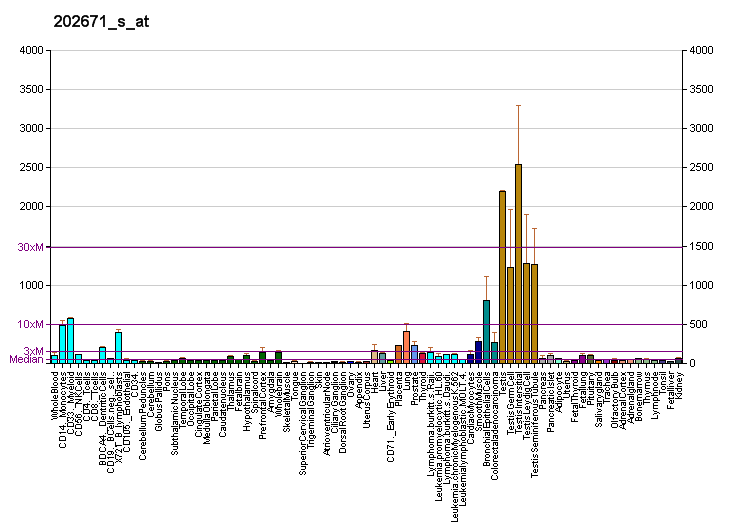

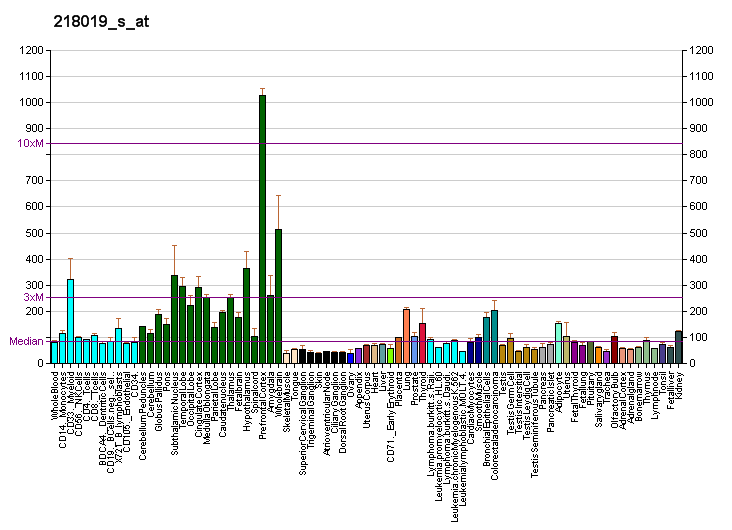

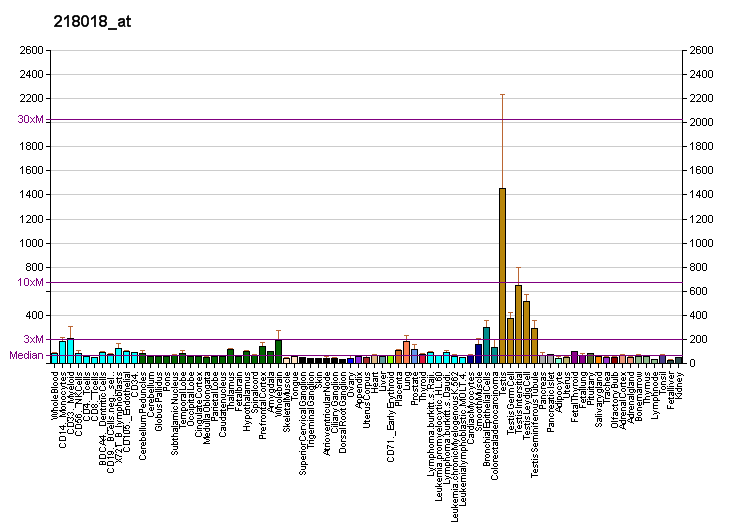
RNA expression pattern
Bgee	Human / Mouse (ortholog); Top expressed in: left testis; right testis; sperm; renal medulla; dorsal motor nucleus of vagus nerve; anterior pituitary; Brodmann area 23; right frontal lobe; Brodmann area 46; nucleus accumbens / Top expressed in: central gray substance of midbrain; vestibular membrane of cochlear duct; entorhinal cortex; perirhinal cortex; nucleus accumbens; motor neuron; nucleus of stria terminalis; superior colliculus; morula; morula; More reference expression data
BioGPS	More reference expression data
Gene ontology
Molecular function	transferase activity; nucleotide binding; protein homodimerization activity; pyridoxal kinase activity; zinc ion binding; potassium ion binding; sodium ion binding; metal ion binding; kinase activity; lithium ion binding; pyridoxal phosphate binding; ATP binding; magnesium ion binding
Cellular component	cytosol; extracellular exosome; nucleus; extracellular region; cytoplasm; secretory granule lumen; specific granule lumen; nucleoplasm
Biological process	pyridoxal phosphate biosynthetic process; phosphorylation; pyridoxal 5'-phosphate salvage; cell population proliferation; neutrophil degranulation; vitamin B6 metabolic process
Sources:Amigo / QuickGO
Orthologs
Databases	NCBI: entry; OMA: entry
Species	Human	Mouse
Entrez	8566	216134
Ensembl	ENSG00000160209	ENSMUSG00000032788
UniProt	O00764	Q8K183
RefSeq (mRNA)	NM_003681; NM_021941; NM_001331030	NM_172134
RefSeq (protein)	NP_001317959; NP_003672	NP_742146
Location (UCSC)	Chr 21: 43.72 – 43.76 Mb	Chr 10: 78.27 – 78.3 Mb
PubMed search
- Wikidata
View/Edit Human	View/Edit Mouse

Pyridoxal kinase is an enzyme that in humans is encoded by the PDXK gene.

The protein encoded by this gene phosphorylates vitamin B_{6}, a step required for the conversion of vitamin B_{6} to pyridoxal-5-phosphate, an important cofactor in intermediary metabolism. The encoded protein is cytoplasmic and probably acts as a homodimer. Alternatively spliced transcript variants have been described, but their biological validity has not been determined.
