= UMODL1-AS1 =

Non-coding RNA in the species Homo sapiens

Identifiers
- Aliases: UMODL1-AS1, C21orf128, UMODL1 antisense RNA 1
- External IDs: GeneCards: UMODL1-AS1

Gene location (Human)
Chr.	Chromosome 21 (human)
Band	21q22.3	Start	42,102,134 bp
Band	21q22.3	End	42,108,534 bp
RNA expression pattern
Bgee	Human / Mouse (ortholog); Top expressed in: gonad; right uterine tube; endothelial cell; olfactory zone of nasal mucosa; prefrontal cortex; right frontal lobe; Brodmann area 9; right lung; left ventricle; granulocyte / n/a; More reference expression data
BioGPS	n/a
Orthologs
Databases	NCBI: entry; OMA: entry
Species	Human	Mouse
Entrez	150147	n/a
Ensembl	ENSG00000184385	n/a
UniProt	n a	n/a
RefSeq (mRNA)	NM_152507	n/a
RefSeq (protein)	n/a	n/a
Location (UCSC)	Chr 21: 42.1 – 42.11 Mb	n/a
PubMed search		n/a
- Wikidata
View/Edit Human

In genetics and genomics, the UMODL1 antisense RNA 1 is a long non-coding RNA. In the genome of humans, the RNA is produced by the transcription of UMODL1-AS1 gene, and located in chromosome 21.
