= RRP1B =

Protein-coding gene in the species Homo sapiens

Identifiers
- Aliases: RRP1B, KIAA0179, NNP1L, Nnp1, PPP1R136, RRP1, ribosomal RNA processing 1B
- External IDs: OMIM: 610654; MGI: 1919712; GeneCards: RRP1B

Gene location (Human)
| Chr. | Chromosome 21 (human) |
| Band | 21q22.3 | Start | 43,659,560 bp |
| Band | 21q22.3 | End | 43,696,079 bp |

Gene location (Mouse)
| Chr. | Chromosome 17 (mouse) |
| Band | 17|17 B1 | Start | 32,255,074 bp |
| Band | 17|17 B1 | End | 32,281,839 bp |
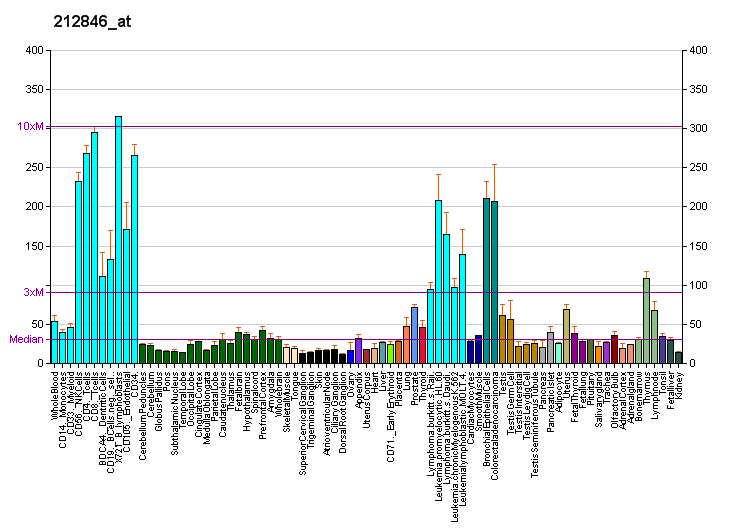

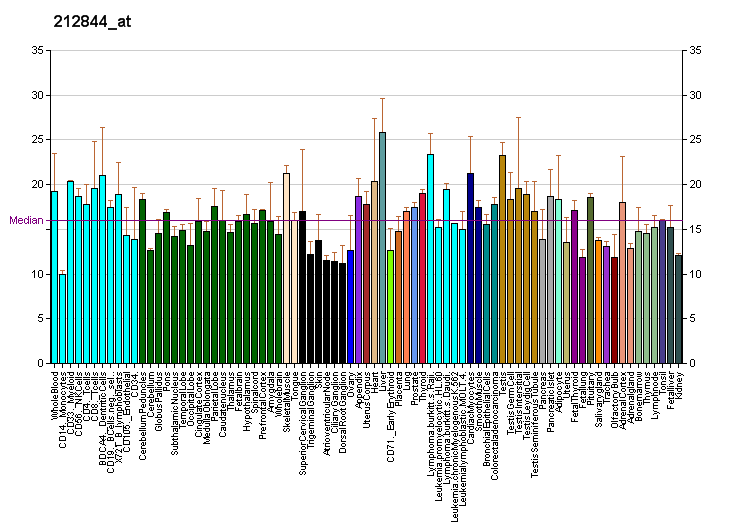
RNA expression pattern
| Bgee | Human / Mouse (ortholog); Top expressed in: germinal epithelium; gingival epithelium; visceral pleura; parietal pleura; tibia; retinal pigment epithelium; endothelial cell; tendon of biceps brachii; skin of hip; mucosa of paranasal sinus / Top expressed in: tail of embryo; neural layer of retina; Rostral migratory stream; primitive streak; genital tubercle; epiblast; embryo; morula; embryo; blastocyst; More reference expression data |
| BioGPS | More reference expression data |
Gene ontology
| Molecular function | RNA binding; transcription coactivator activity; protein binding |
| Cellular component | heterochromatin; preribosome, small subunit precursor; cytosol; euchromatin; nucleolus; nucleus; preribosome, large subunit precursor; granular component; nucleoplasm; chromosome |
| Biological process | negative regulation of phosphatase activity; rRNA processing; negative regulation of GTPase activity; positive regulation of apoptotic process; regulation of RNA splicing; positive regulation of transcription by RNA polymerase II; cellular response to virus; mRNA processing; apoptotic process; RNA splicing |
Sources:Amigo / QuickGO
Orthologs
| Databases | NCBI: entry; OMA: entry |
| Species | Human | Mouse |
| Entrez | 23076 | 72462 |
| Ensembl | ENSG00000160208 | ENSMUSG00000058392 |
| UniProt | Q14684 | Q91YK2 |
| RefSeq (mRNA) | NM_015056 | NM_001163734; NM_028244 |
| RefSeq (protein) | NP_055871 | NP_001157206; NP_082520 |
| Location (UCSC) | Chr 21: 43.66 – 43.7 Mb | Chr 17: 32.26 – 32.28 Mb |
| PubMed search |
- Wikidata
| View/Edit Human | View/Edit Mouse |

Ribosomal RNA processing protein 1 homolog B is a protein encoded by RRP1B gene which is located on Chromosome 21.
