= Glucose-6-phosphate exchanger SLC37A1 =

Protein-coding gene in the species Homo sapiens

SLC37A1

Identifiers
- Aliases: SLC37A1, G3PP, solute carrier family 37 member 1
- External IDs: OMIM: 608094; MGI: 2446181; GeneCards: SLC37A1

Gene location (Human)
Chr.	Chromosome 21 (human)
Band	21q22.3	Start	42,496,008 bp
Band	21q22.3	End	42,581,440 bp

Gene location (Mouse)
Chr.	Chromosome 17 (mouse)
Band	17|17 B1	Start	31,505,766 bp
Band	17|17 B1	End	31,569,713 bp
RNA expression pattern
Bgee	Human / Mouse (ortholog); Top expressed in: olfactory zone of nasal mucosa; left testis; right uterine tube; rectum; anterior pituitary; right testis; gallbladder; transverse colon; minor salivary glands; duodenum / Top expressed in: colon; intestinal villus; crypt of lieberkuhn of small intestine; duodenum; left colon; jejunum; embryo; pyloric antrum; granulocyte; gastric mucosa; More reference expression data
BioGPS	n/a
Gene ontology
Molecular function	transporter activity; antiporter activity; glucose 6-phosphate:inorganic phosphate antiporter activity; transmembrane transporter activity
Cellular component	integral component of endoplasmic reticulum membrane; membrane; endoplasmic reticulum; integral component of membrane; endoplasmic reticulum membrane
Biological process	phosphate ion transmembrane transport; carbohydrate transport; transmembrane transport; glucose-6-phosphate transport; transport
Sources:Amigo / QuickGO
Orthologs
Databases	NCBI: entry; OMA: entry
Species	Human	Mouse
Entrez	54020	224674
Ensembl	ENSG00000160190	ENSMUSG00000024036
UniProt	P57057	Q8R070
RefSeq (mRNA)	NM_018964; NM_001320537	NM_001242427; NM_153062
RefSeq (protein)	NP_001307466; NP_061837	NP_001229356; NP_694702
Location (UCSC)	Chr 21: 42.5 – 42.58 Mb	Chr 17: 31.51 – 31.57 Mb
PubMed search
- Wikidata
View/Edit Human	View/Edit Mouse

Glucose-6-phosphate exchanger SLC37A1 is a protein that in humans is encoded by the SLC37A1 gene. SLC37A1 locates to the membrane of the endoplasmic reticulum (ER), and is a glucose 6-phosphate:inorganic phosphate antiporter, transporting glucose 6-phosphate from the cytoplasm into the lumen of the ER, while transporting phosphate in the opposite direction.

Unlike the related SLC37A4 protein, SLC37A1 does not appear to be involved in blood glucose homeostasis, but does appear to regulate phosphate levels in the milk of cows, with flow-on effects on the volume of milk produced.
