= GATD3 =

Protein-coding gene in the species Homo sapiens

Identifiers
- Aliases: GATD3, ES1, GT335, HES1, KNPH, KNPI, chromosome 21 open reading frame 33, C21orf33, glutamine amidotransferase like class 1 domain containing 3A, glutamine amidotransferase class 1 domain containing 3A, GATD3A, glutamine amidotransferase class 1 domain containing 3
- External IDs: OMIM: 601659; MGI: 1351861; GeneCards: GATD3

Gene location (Human)
Chr.	Chromosome 21 (human)
Band	21q22.3	Start	44,133,610 bp
Band	21q22.3	End	44,210,114 bp

Gene location (Mouse)
Chr.	Chromosome 10 (mouse)
Band	10 C1|10 39.72 cM	Start	77,997,900 bp
Band	10 C1|10 39.72 cM	End	78,005,616 bp
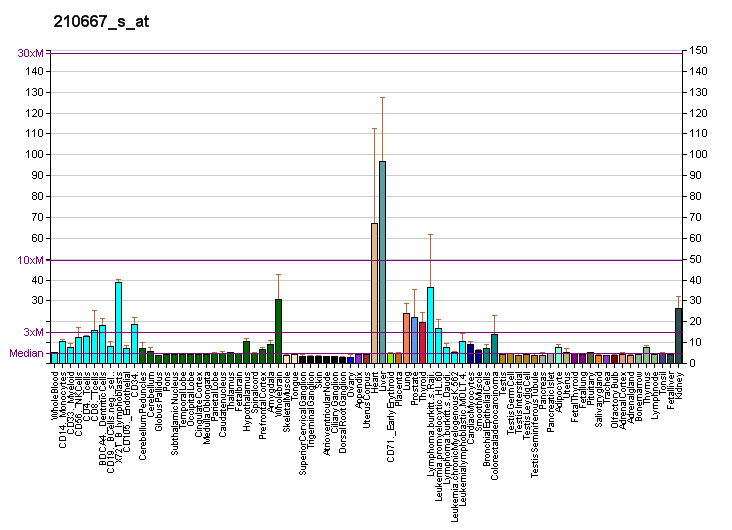

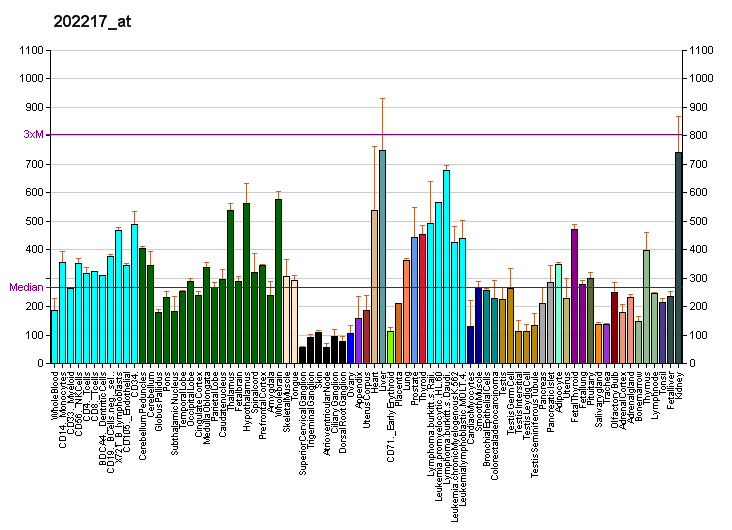
RNA expression pattern
Bgee	Human / Mouse (ortholog); Top expressed in: mucosa of transverse colon; gastric mucosa; stromal cell of endometrium; gastrocnemius muscle; left ventricle; canal of the cervix; fundus; right hemisphere of cerebellum; right ovary; prefrontal cortex / Top expressed in: right ventricle; myocardium of ventricle; digastric muscle; brown adipose tissue; sternocleidomastoid muscle; temporal muscle; cardiac muscles; muscle of thigh; triceps brachii muscle; interventricular septum; More reference expression data
BioGPS	More reference expression data
Orthologs
Databases	NCBI: entry; OMA: entry
Species	Human	Mouse
Entrez	8209	28295
Ensembl	ENSG00000160221	ENSMUSG00000053329
UniProt	F2Z2Q0; H7C1F6	Q9D172
RefSeq (mRNA)	NM_004649; NM_198155; NM_001320383; NM_001320384	NM_138601; NM_001364646
RefSeq (protein)	NP_001307312; NP_001307313; NP_004640; NP_937798; NP_001350687 NP_001350689; NP_001350690	NP_613067; NP_001351575
Location (UCSC)	Chr 21: 44.13 – 44.21 Mb	Chr 10: 78 – 78.01 Mb
PubMed search
- Wikidata
View/Edit Human	View/Edit Mouse

Glutamine amidotransferase-like class 1 domain-containing protein 3A, mitochondrial is a protein that in humans is encoded by the GATD3 gene.

== See also ==
- Glutamine amidotransferase
