= CYYR1 =

Protein-coding gene in the species Homo sapiens

Identifiers
- Aliases: CYYR1, C21orf95, cysteine and tyrosine rich 1
- External IDs: OMIM: 616020; MGI: 2152187; HomoloGene: 14191; GeneCards: CYYR1; OMA:CYYR1 - orthologs

Gene location (Human)
Chr.	Chromosome 21 (human)
Band	21q21.3	Start	26,466,209 bp
Band	21q21.3	End	26,573,286 bp

Gene location (Mouse)
Chr.	Chromosome 16 (mouse)
Band	16 C3.3|16 47.45 cM	Start	85,218,421 bp
Band	16 C3.3|16 47.45 cM	End	85,350,285 bp
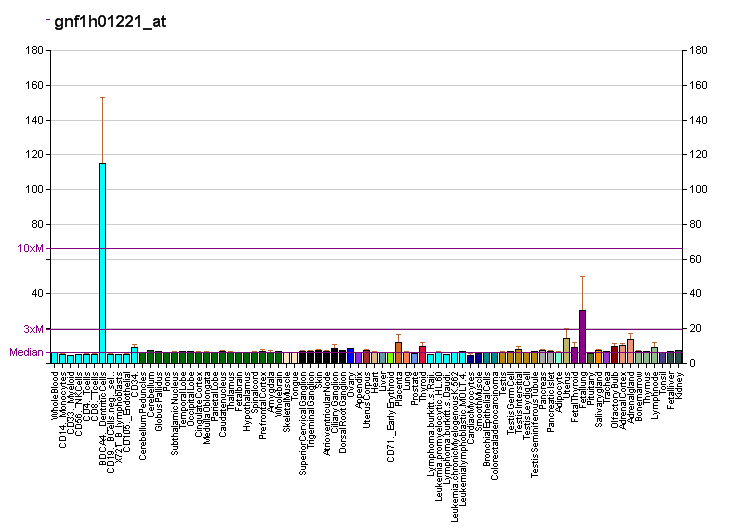
RNA expression pattern
Bgee	Human / Mouse (ortholog); Top expressed in: visceral pleura; myocardium of left ventricle; parietal pleura; pericardium; vena cava; epithelium of lactiferous gland; lactiferous duct; right ventricle; urethra; superficial temporal artery / Top expressed in: right lung lobe; left lung lobe; myocardium of ventricle; endothelial cell of lymphatic vessel; extraocular muscle; carotid body; digastric muscle; brown adipose tissue; soleus muscle; body of femur; More reference expression data
BioGPS	More reference expression data
Gene ontology
Molecular function	molecular function
Cellular component	integral component of membrane; membrane
Biological process	biological process
Sources:Amigo / QuickGO
Orthologs
Species	Human	Mouse
Entrez	116159	224405
Ensembl	ENSG00000166265	ENSMUSG00000041134
UniProt	Q96J86	Q8VIH7
RefSeq (mRNA)	NM_052954; NM_001320768	NM_144853
RefSeq (protein)	NP_001307697; NP_443186	NP_659102
Location (UCSC)	Chr 21: 26.47 – 26.57 Mb	Chr 16: 85.22 – 85.35 Mb
PubMed search
- Wikidata
View/Edit Human	View/Edit Mouse

Cysteine and tyrosine-rich protein 1 is a protein that in humans is encoded by the CYYR1 gene and is located on chromosome 21, location 21q21.2. This protein has a function that is not presently understood.

== Protein ==
The product of the gene is a single pass type 1 transmembrane protein with four exons and a very large intron of 85.8 kb and coding for a protein containing 154 amino acids. The most prominent feature identified in the protein is a central, unique cysteine and tyrosine-rich protein domain, on portion of the protein which is located inside the cell. This domain is found to be strongly conserved from lower vertebrates (fishes) to humans but is absent in bacteria and invertebrates.

=== Properties and Domains ===
Bioinformatic analysis predicted the following properties for CYYR1:

- Molecular Weight = 16.6kdal
- Isoelectric Point = 8.28

The amino acid sequence is 153 amino acids long and contains 3 domains.

1   MDAPRLPVRP GVLLPKLVLL FVYADDCLAQ CGKDCKSYCC DGTTPYCCSY
51  YAYIGNILSG TAIAGIVFGI VFIMGVIAGI AICICMCMKN HRATRVGILR
101 TTHINTVSSY PGPPPYGHDH EMEYCDLPPP YSPTPQGPAQ RSPPPPYPGN
151 ARK

Using bioinformatic tools the following domains were determined:

- Signal Peptide - Position 1-29
- Transmembrane Domain - Position 62-82
- Poly-Proline Domain - Position 144-149

=== Orthologs ===
Multiple sequence alignments were done with orthologs of the CYYR1 gene and they show that the protein sequence is highly conserved throughout all vertebrates.

Species	Accession #	Identity
Pan troglodytes	XP_001158941.1	99.2%
Macaca mulatta	XP_001104127.1	95.5%
Mus musculus	NP_659102.1	88.2%
Xenopus laevis	NP_001088967.1	74.3%
Danio rerio	NP_998047.1	60.4%

There are no known or predicted paralogs in Homo sapiens.

=== Interactions ===
CYYR1 has been shown to increase glutathione (GSH) level in yeast cells when complementing a defect in GSH uptake in yeast cells that lack Hgt1p, the primary yeast GSH uptake transporter. However, the CYYR1 gene is not naturally found in yeast, so function of CYYR1 is still unknown.
