= FRGCA =

Non-coding RNA in the species Homo sapiens

Identifiers
- Aliases: FRGCA, FOXM1-regulated, gastric cancer associated
- External IDs: GeneCards: FRGCA

Gene location (Human)
Chr.	Chromosome 21 (human)
Band	21q22.3	Start	43,140,523 bp
Band	21q22.3	End	43,141,092 bp
RNA expression pattern
Bgee	Human / Mouse (ortholog); Top expressed in: bone marrow cell; stromal cell of endometrium; lymph node; muscle tissue; blood; olfactory zone of nasal mucosa; tonsil; monocyte; placenta; duodenum / n/a; More reference expression data
BioGPS	n/a
Orthologs
Databases	NCBI: entry; OMA: entry
Species	Human	Mouse
Entrez	106481742	n/a
Ensembl	ENSG00000236663	n/a
UniProt	n a	n/a
RefSeq (mRNA)	n/a	n/a
RefSeq (protein)	n/a	n/a
Location (UCSC)	Chr 21: 43.14 – 43.14 Mb	n/a
PubMed search		n/a
- Wikidata
View/Edit Human

FOXM1-regulated, gastric cancer associated is a long non-coding RNA that in humans is encoded by the FRGCA gene.

== See also ==
- FOXM1
- Stomach cancer, also known as gastric cancer
