= SPATC1L =

Protein-coding gene in humans

Identifiers
- Aliases: SPATC1L, C21orf56, spermatogenesis and centriole associated 1-like, spermatogenesis and centriole associated 1 like
- External IDs: OMIM: 612412; MGI: 1923823; HomoloGene: 75292; GeneCards: SPATC1L; OMA:SPATC1L - orthologs

Gene location (Human)
Chr.	Chromosome 21 (human)
Band	21q22.3	Start	46,161,148 bp
Band	21q22.3	End	46,184,476 bp

Gene location (Mouse)
Chr.	Chromosome 10 (mouse)
Band	10|10 C1	Start	76,398,106 bp
Band	10|10 C1	End	76,406,035 bp
RNA expression pattern
Bgee	Human / Mouse (ortholog); Top expressed in: right testis; left testis; left adrenal cortex; prostate; right adrenal cortex; putamen; temporal lobe; amygdala; nucleus accumbens; hippocampus proper / Top expressed in: seminiferous tubule; spermatid; parasympathetic nervous system; thyroid gland; pharynx; tongue; spermatocyte; embryo; submandibular gland; right kidney; More reference expression data
BioGPS	n/a
Gene ontology
Molecular function	protein binding; molecular function
Cellular component	centrosome; cellular component
Biological process	biological process
Sources:Amigo / QuickGO
Orthologs
Species	Human	Mouse
Entrez	84221	76573
Ensembl	ENSG00000160284; ENSG00000274679	ENSMUSG00000009115
UniProt	Q9H0A9	Q9D9W0
RefSeq (mRNA)	NM_001142854; NM_032261	NM_029661; NM_001359186
RefSeq (protein)	NP_001136326; NP_115637	NP_083937; NP_001346115
Location (UCSC)	Chr 21: 46.16 – 46.18 Mb	Chr 10: 76.4 – 76.41 Mb
PubMed search
- Wikidata
View/Edit Human	View/Edit Mouse

SPATC1L is a protein that in humans is encoded by the SPATC1L gene.
