= SIK1 =

Protein-coding gene in the species Homo sapiens

Identifiers
- Aliases: SIK1, MSK, SIK, SNF1LK, EIEE30, salt inducible kinase 1, SIK-1, SIK1B, DEE30
- External IDs: OMIM: 605705; MGI: 104754; GeneCards: SIK1
Enzyme activity
EC #	BRENDA	ExPASy	KEGG	MetaCyc
2.7.11.1	↗	↗	↗	↗

Gene location (Human)
Chr.	Chromosome 21 (human)
Band	21q22.3	Start	43,414,483 bp
Band	21q22.3	End	43,427,131 bp

Gene location (Mouse)
Chr.	Chromosome 17 (mouse)
Band	17 B1|17 17.25 cM	Start	32,063,224 bp
Band	17 B1|17 17.25 cM	End	32,074,778 bp
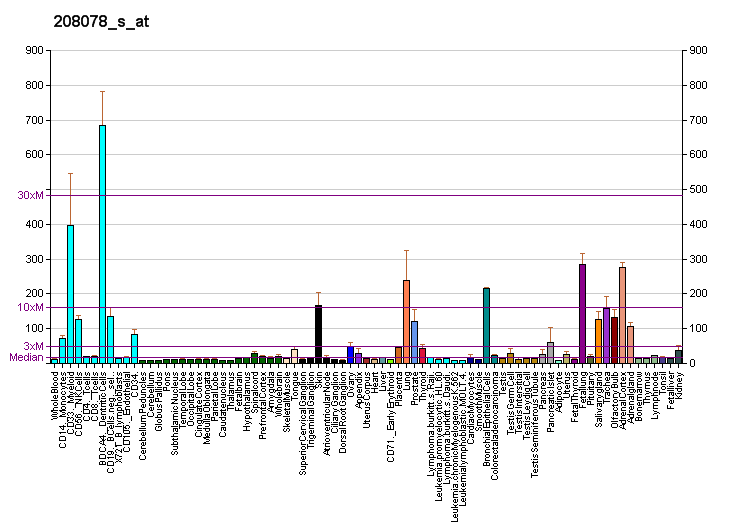

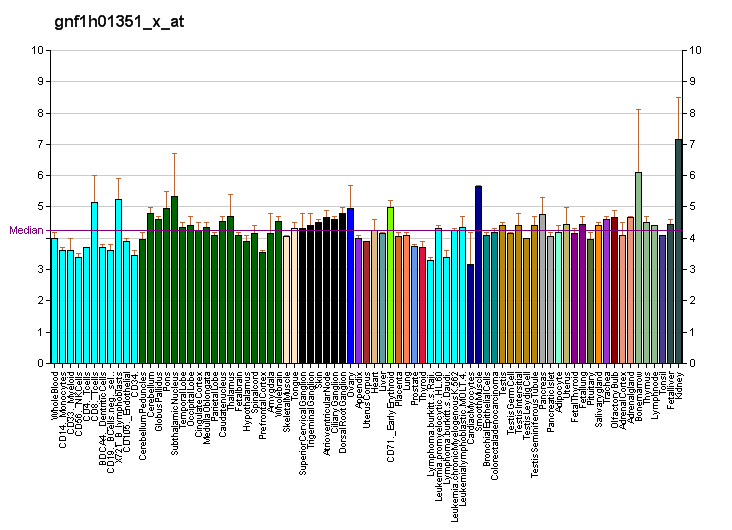
RNA expression pattern
Bgee	Human / Mouse (ortholog); Top expressed in: gastric mucosa; skin of abdomen; skin of leg; gallbladder; bone marrow cell; left ovary; left uterine tube; vagina; right ovary; upper lobe of left lung / Top expressed in: granulocyte; decidua; yolk sac; lip; muscle of thigh; genital tubercle; proximal tubule; tail of embryo; esophagus; endocardial cushion; More reference expression data
BioGPS	More reference expression data
Gene ontology
Molecular function	transferase activity; nucleotide binding; protein kinase activity; cAMP response element binding protein binding; 14-3-3 protein binding; metal ion binding; kinase activity; protein serine/threonine kinase activity; protein binding; ATP binding; protein kinase binding; magnesium ion binding
Cellular component	cytoplasm; nucleus; nucleotide-activated protein kinase complex
Biological process	regulation of myotube differentiation; cell differentiation; intracellular signal transduction; phosphorylation; regulation of sodium ion transport; rhythmic process; cardiac muscle cell differentiation; negative regulation of triglyceride biosynthetic process; negative regulation of CREB transcription factor activity; multicellular organism development; protein phosphorylation; negative regulation of gluconeogenesis; regulation of mitotic cell cycle; regulation of cell differentiation; protein autophosphorylation; cell cycle; positive regulation of anoikis; entrainment of circadian clock by photoperiod; cellular response to hormone stimulus; negative regulation of TOR signaling; cellular response to glucose starvation
Sources:Amigo / QuickGO
Orthologs
Databases	NCBI: entry; OMA: entry
Species	Human	Mouse
Entrez	150094	17691
Ensembl	ENSG00000142178	ENSMUSG00000024042
UniProt	P57059	Q60670
RefSeq (mRNA)	NM_173354	NM_010831
RefSeq (protein)	NP_001307572	NP_034961
Location (UCSC)	Chr 21: 43.41 – 43.43 Mb	Chr 17: 32.06 – 32.07 Mb
PubMed search
- Wikidata
View/Edit Human	View/Edit Mouse

Serine/threonine-protein kinase SIK1 is an enzyme that in humans is encoded by the SIK1 gene.

== See also ==
- Serine/threonine-protein kinase
- SIK2
