= SMIM11 =

Identifiers
- Aliases: SMIM11, C21orf51, FAM165B, small integral membrane protein 11, SMIM11B, SMIM11A, small integral membrane protein 11A
- External IDs: HomoloGene: 129857; GeneCards: SMIM11; OMA:SMIM11 - orthologs

Gene location (Human)
Chr.	Chromosome 21 (human)
Band	21q22.11	Start	34,375,480 bp
Band	21q22.11	End	34,416,961 bp
RNA expression pattern
Bgee	Human / Mouse (ortholog); Top expressed in: body of stomach; muscle of thigh; fundus; nucleus accumbens; prefrontal cortex; putamen; gastrocnemius muscle; islet of Langerhans; anterior cingulate cortex; amygdala / n/a; More reference expression data
BioGPS	n/a
Gene ontology
Molecular function	molecular function
Cellular component	membrane; integral component of membrane; cellular component
Biological process	biological process
Sources:Amigo / QuickGO
Orthologs
Species	Human	Mouse
Entrez	54065	n/a
Ensembl	ENSG00000205670	n/a
UniProt	P58511	n/a
RefSeq (mRNA)	NM_058182; NM_001376899	n/a
RefSeq (protein)	NP_478062; NP_001363828	n/a
Location (UCSC)	Chr 21: 34.38 – 34.42 Mb	n/a
PubMed search		n/a
- Wikidata
View/Edit Human

Small integral membrane protein 11 is a protein which in humans is encoded by the SMIM11 gene.

== Gene ==
=== Locus ===
SMIM11 is located on the plus strand of chromosome 21 and has 4 exons.

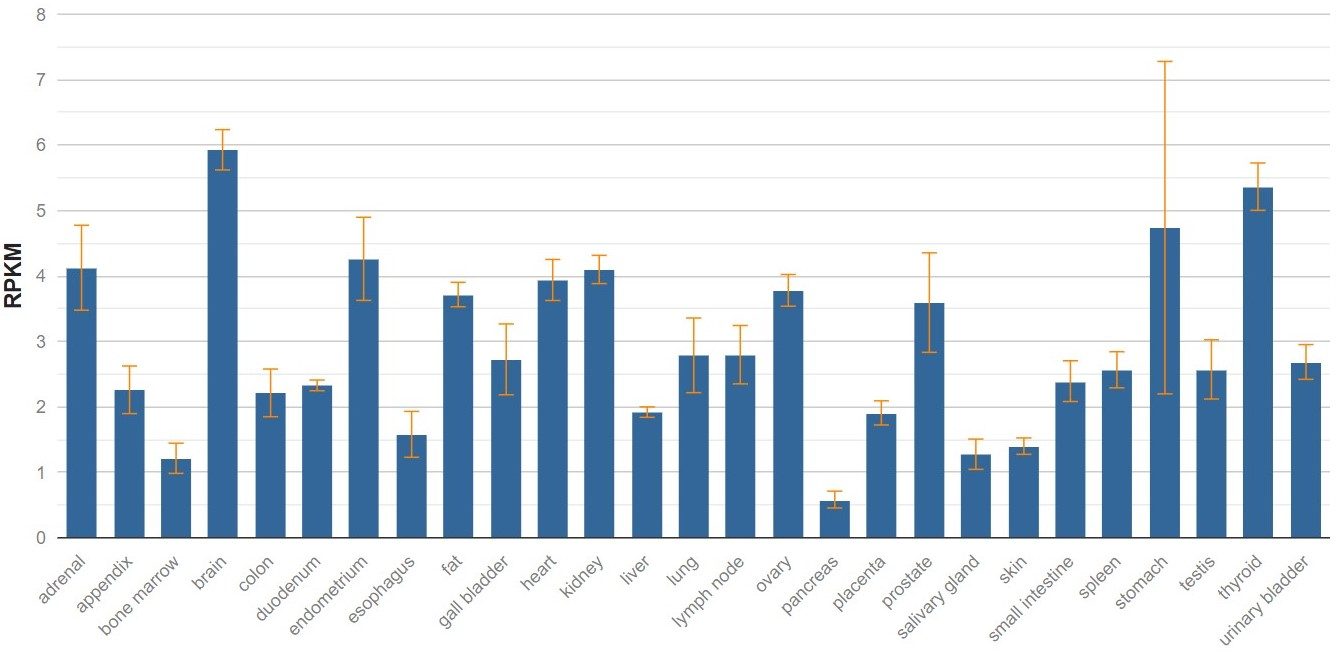
Expression of SMIM11A in human tissue samples

=== Expression ===
The expression of SMIM11 is highest in the brain, thyroid, and stomach, though it is also expressed in many other tissues.

== mRNA ==
There are no known transcript variants or isoforms of SMIM11.

== Protein ==
The SMIM11 protein is 58 amino acids long. The theoretical molecular weight of this protein is 6kDa and the theoretical pI is 9. The protein is localized in the cytoplasm and mitochondria, as well as focal adhesion points between the cells.

=== Domains, Motifs, and Post-translational Modifications ===
SMIM11 contains a transmembrane domain. The protein also holds a dileucine motif. Post-translational modifications include ubiquitylation site, as well as two phosphorylated sites, one on a threonine and one on a serine

=== Secondary Structure and Tertiary Structure ===
The protein is composed mostly of alpha-helices. The N-terminus of SMIM11 sticks out into the extracellular matrix, while the C-terminal end is located within the cytoplasm of the cell.

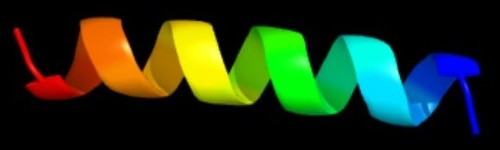
Tertiary Structure of SMIM11

=== Quaternary Structure and Protein Interactions ===
Experimentally-determined protein interactions for SMIM11 have not yet been identified.

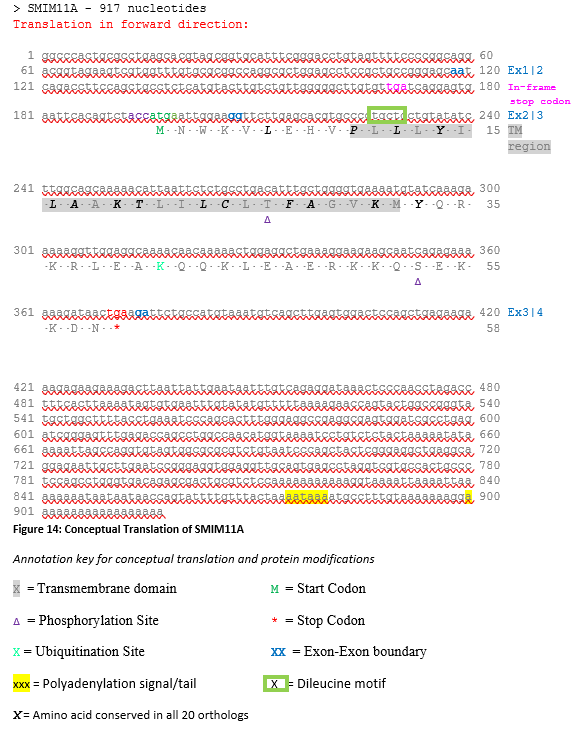
Concenptual translation of SMIM11

== Homology and Evolution ==
=== Paralogs ===
No paralogs or paralogous domains exist for SMIM11

=== Orthologs ===
SMIM11 has a large number of orthologs. These orthologs range from other mammals to birds, reptiles, amphibians, and bony fish.

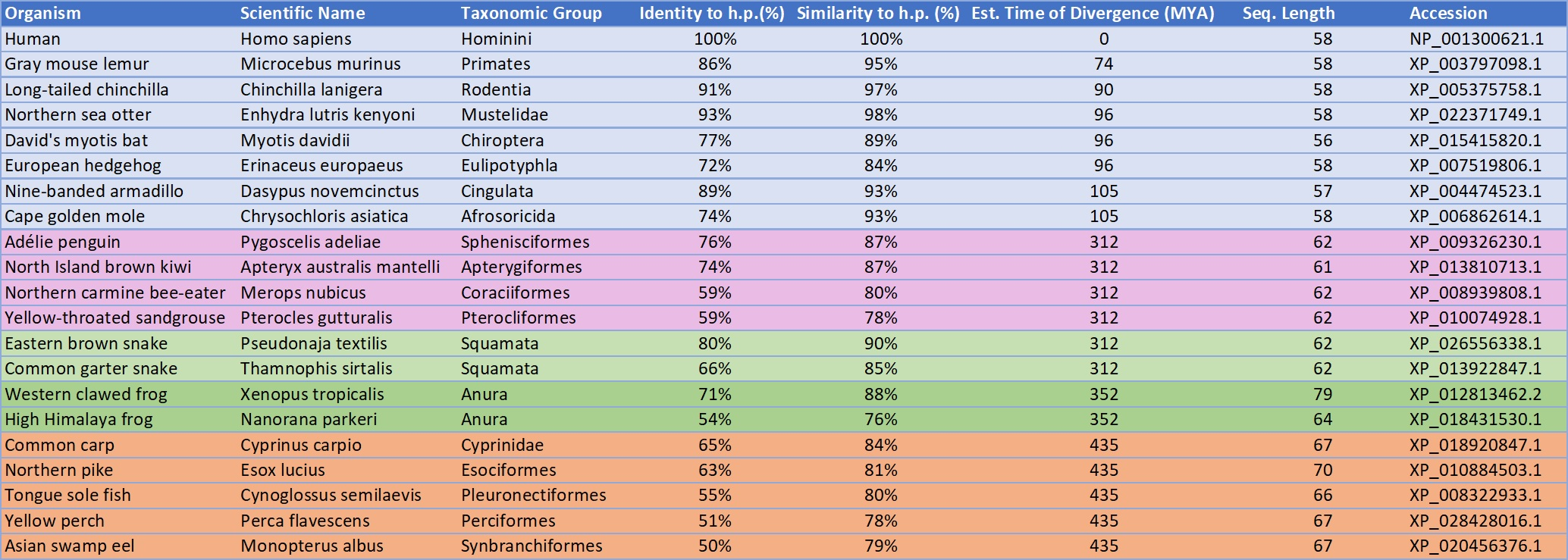
Ortholog Table of SMIM11
