= Methyltransferase HEMK2 =

Enzyme found in humans

HEMK2

Identifiers
- Aliases: HEMK2, C21orf127, MTQ2, N6AMT, m.HsaHemK2P, PRED28, N-6 adenine-specific DNA methyltransferase 1 (putative), N-6 adenine-specific DNA methyltransferase 1, PrmC, KMT9, N6AMT1, HemK methyltransferase 2, ETF1 glutamine and histone H4 lysine
- External IDs: OMIM: 614553; MGI: 1915018; GeneCards: HEMK2

Gene location (Human)
Chr.	Chromosome 21 (human)
Band	21q21.3	Start	28,872,191 bp
Band	21q21.3	End	28,885,371 bp

Gene location (Mouse)
Chr.	Chromosome 16 (mouse)
Band	16|16 C3.3	Start	87,151,073 bp
Band	16|16 C3.3	End	87,165,630 bp
RNA expression pattern
Bgee	Human / Mouse (ortholog); Top expressed in: testicle; gonad; ventricular zone; right uterine tube; apex of heart; left ovary; right adrenal gland; right adrenal cortex; ganglionic eminence; body of uterus / Top expressed in: interventricular septum; superior cervical ganglion; hand; genital tubercle; yolk sac; right kidney; spinal ganglia; Rostral migratory stream; tail of embryo; proximal tubule; More reference expression data
BioGPS	n/a
Gene ontology
Molecular function	nucleic acid binding; methyltransferase activity; protein methyltransferase activity; transferase activity; protein binding; S-adenosylmethionine-dependent methyltransferase activity
Cellular component	cytosol; cytoplasm; protein-containing complex
Biological process	positive regulation of cell growth; protein methylation; methylation
Sources:Amigo / QuickGO
Orthologs
Databases	NCBI: entry; OMA: entry
Species	Human	Mouse
Entrez	29104	67768
Ensembl	ENSG00000156239	ENSMUSG00000044442
UniProt	Q9Y5N5	Q6SKR2
RefSeq (mRNA)	NM_013240; NM_182749	NM_001159331; NM_026366
RefSeq (protein)	NP_037372; NP_877426	NP_001152803; NP_080642
Location (UCSC)	Chr 21: 28.87 – 28.89 Mb	Chr 16: 87.15 – 87.17 Mb
PubMed search
- Wikidata
View/Edit Human	View/Edit Mouse

Methyltransferase HEMK2 is an enzyme that in humans is encoded by the HEMK2 gene (previously N6AMT1). HEMK2 binds to TRMT112 to form a heterodimer, which performs protein methylation. HEMK2 also has some ability to methylate arsenic, but seems to have a much lesser role in arsenic metabolism than AS3MT. It was previously reported that this enzyme functioned as a N_{6}-adenine-specific DNA methyltransferase, hence its previous symbol N6AMT1, but later studies failed to confirm this result.

== Function ==
The encoded enzyme may be involved in the methylation of release factor I during translation termination. This enzyme is also involved in converting the arsenic metabolite monomethylarsonous acid to the less toxic dimethylarsonic acid. Alternative splicing of this gene results in multiple transcript variants. A related pseudogene has been identified on chromosome 11. [provided by RefSeq, Jul 2014]. HEMK2 functions as a protein glutamine methyltransferase and is essential for mouse development (Liu et al., Mol. Cell. Biol. 2010).
