= TTC3 =

Protein-coding gene in the species Homo sapiens

Identifiers
- Aliases: TTC3, DCRR1, RNF105, TPRDIII, tetratricopeptide repeat domain 3
- External IDs: OMIM: 602259; MGI: 1276539; GeneCards: TTC3
Enzyme activity
| EC # | BRENDA | ExPASy | KEGG | MetaCyc |
|---|---|---|---|---|
| 2.3.2.27 | ↗ | ↗ | ↗ | ↗ |

Gene location (Human)
| Chr. | Chromosome 21 (human) |
| Band | 21q22.13 | Start | 37,073,226 bp |
| Band | 21q22.13 | End | 37,203,112 bp |

Gene location (Mouse)
| Chr. | Chromosome 16 (mouse) |
| Band | 16 C4|16 55.18 cM | Start | 94,370,618 bp |
| Band | 16 C4|16 55.18 cM | End | 94,469,343 bp |
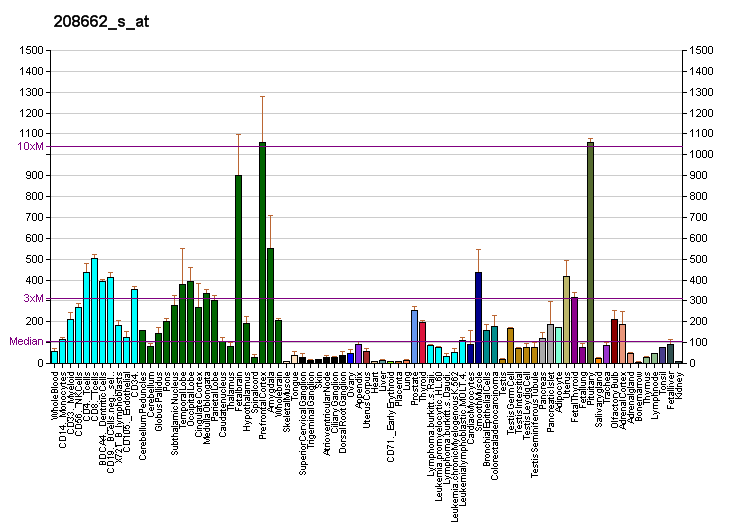

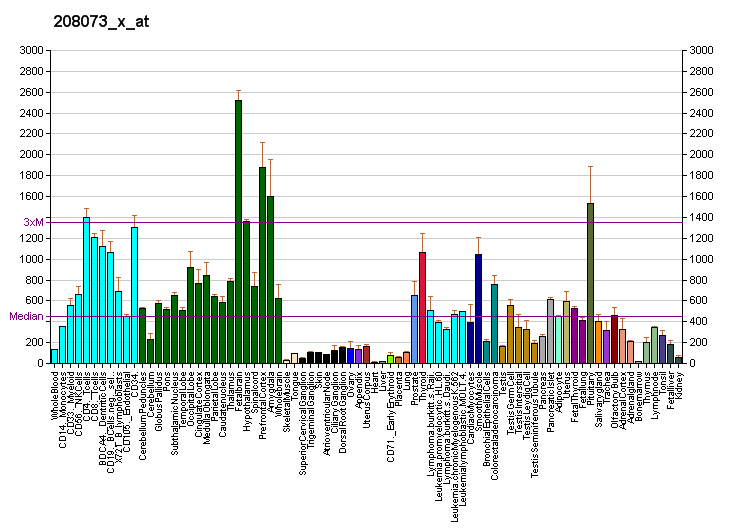

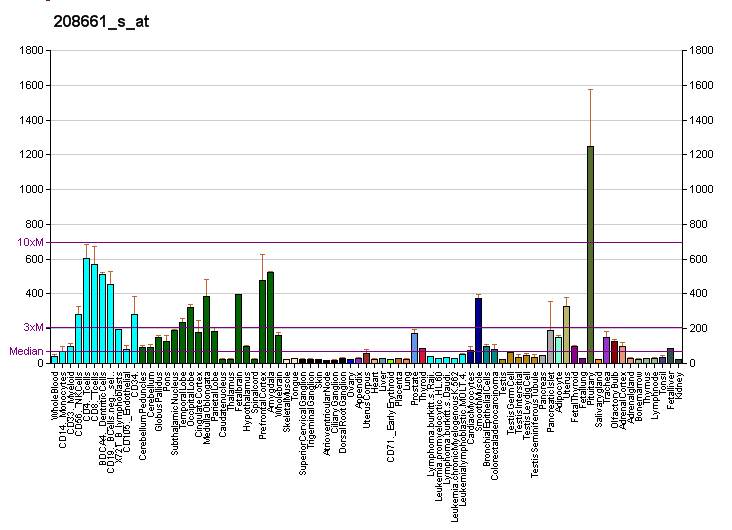
RNA expression pattern
| Bgee | Human / Mouse (ortholog); Top expressed in: entorhinal cortex; middle temporal gyrus; tibia; Brodmann area 23; postcentral gyrus; external globus pallidus; pars compacta; lateral nuclear group of thalamus; pars reticulata; corpus epididymis / Top expressed in: substantia nigra; dorsomedial hypothalamic nucleus; paraventricular nucleus of hypothalamus; suprachiasmatic nucleus; ventromedial nucleus; pontine nuclei; Rostral migratory stream; arcuate nucleus; anterior amygdaloid area; dorsal tegmental nucleus; More reference expression data |
| BioGPS | More reference expression data |
Gene ontology
| Molecular function | protein binding; metal ion binding; ubiquitin-protein transferase activity; transferase activity |
| Cellular component | nucleolus; nucleus; cytosol |
| Biological process | protein K48-linked ubiquitination; protein ubiquitination; ubiquitin-dependent protein catabolic process |
Sources:Amigo / QuickGO
Orthologs
| Databases | NCBI: entry; OMA: entry |
| Species | Human | Mouse |
| Entrez | 7267 | 22129 |
| Ensembl | ENSG00000182670 | ENSMUSG00000040785 |
| UniProt | P53804 | O88196 |
| RefSeq (mRNA) | NM_001001894; NM_003316; NM_001320703; NM_001320704; NM_001330681 NM_001330682; NM_001330683; NM_001353936; NM_001353937; NM_001353938 | NM_009441 |
| RefSeq (protein) | NP_001001894; NP_001307632; NP_001307633; NP_001317610; NP_001317611 NP_001317612; NP_003307; NP_001340865; NP_001340866; NP_001340867 | XP_011249721.1; XP_011249722.1; XP_011249724.1; XP_011249725.1; XP_011249730.1 XP_011249731.1; XP_011249732.1; XP_011249733.1 |
| Location (UCSC) | Chr 21: 37.07 – 37.2 Mb | Chr 16: 94.37 – 94.47 Mb |
| PubMed search |
- Wikidata
| View/Edit Human | View/Edit Mouse |

Tetratricopeptide repeat protein 3 is a protein that in humans is encoded by the TTC3 gene.
