= MIR3648 =

MIR3648-1

Identifiers
- Aliases: MIR3648-1, MIR3648, hsa-mir-3648-1, microRNA 3648-1, MicroRNA 3648
- External IDs: GeneCards: MIR3648-1; OMA:MIR3648-1 - orthologs

Gene location (Human)
Chr.	Chromosome 21 (human)
Band	21p11.2	Start	8,208,473 bp
Band	21p11.2	End	8,208,652 bp
RNA expression pattern
Bgee	Human / Mouse (ortholog); Top expressed in: bone marrow cell; sural nerve; epithelium of colon; mucosa of transverse colon; tonsil; olfactory zone of nasal mucosa; gonad; blood; liver; skeletal muscle tissue / n/a; More reference expression data
BioGPS	n/a
Orthologs
Species	Human	Mouse
Entrez	100500862	n/a
Ensembl	ENSG00000275708	n/a
UniProt	n a	n/a
RefSeq (mRNA)	n/a	n/a
RefSeq (protein)	n/a	n/a
Location (UCSC)	Chr 21: 8.21 – 8.21 Mb	n/a
PubMed search		n/a
- Wikidata
View/Edit Human

MicroRNA 3648 is a microRNA that in humans is produced by MIR3648 gene. This gene was recently shown to be specific to humans by Nathan H. Lents and colleagues.

== Function ==
microRNAs (miRNAs) are short (20-24 nt) non-coding RNAs that are involved in post-transcriptional regulation of gene expression in multicellular organisms by affecting both the stability and translation of mRNAs. miRNAs are transcribed by RNA polymerase II as part of capped and polyadenylated primary transcripts (pri-miRNAs) that can be either protein-coding or non-coding. The primary transcript is cleaved by the Drosha ribonuclease III enzyme to produce an approximately 70-nt stem-loop precursor miRNA (pre-miRNA), which is further cleaved by the cytoplasmic Dicer ribonuclease to generate the mature miRNA and antisense miRNA star (miRNA*) products. The mature miRNA is incorporated into a RNA-induced silencing complex (RISC), which recognizes target mRNAs through imperfect base pairing with the miRNA and most commonly results in translational inhibition or destabilization of the target mRNA. The RefSeq represents the predicted microRNA stem-loop. [provided by RefSeq, Sep 2009].
