= RWDD2B =

Protein-coding gene in the species Homo sapiens

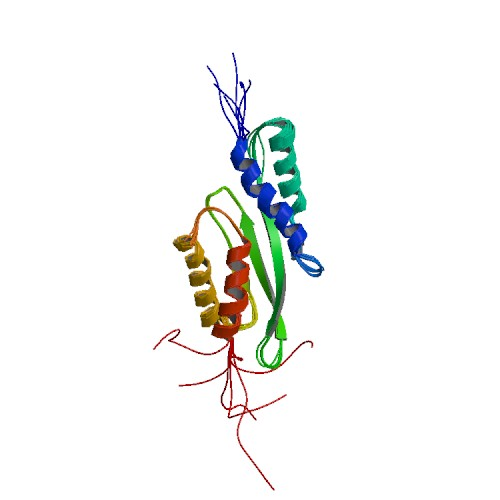

Identifiers
- Aliases: RWDD2B, C21orf6, GL011, RWD domain containing 2B
- External IDs: OMIM: 617843; MGI: 1858215; GeneCards: RWDD2B
Available structures
PDB	Ortholog search: PDBe RCSB
PDB	List of PDB id codes 2DAX

Gene location (Human)
Chr.	Chromosome 21 (human)
Band	21q21.3	Start	29,004,384 bp
Band	21q21.3	End	29,019,360 bp

Gene location (Mouse)
Chr.	Chromosome 16 (mouse)
Band	16|16 C3.3	Start	87,230,295 bp
Band	16|16 C3.3	End	87,237,461 bp
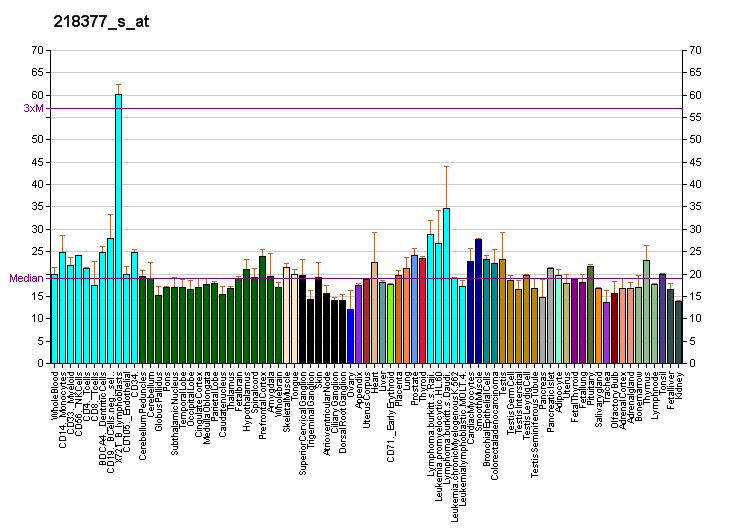
RNA expression pattern
Bgee	Human / Mouse (ortholog); Top expressed in: Skeletal muscle tissue of biceps brachii; glutes; triceps brachii muscle; muscle of thigh; gastrocnemius muscle; vastus lateralis muscle; deltoid muscle; tendon of biceps brachii; right adrenal gland; right adrenal cortex / Top expressed in: otic vesicle; saccule; otic placode; intestinal villus; jejunum; duodenum; primary oocyte; proximal tubule; Paneth cell; ileum; More reference expression data
BioGPS	More reference expression data
Gene ontology
Molecular function	protein binding; molecular function
Cellular component	cellular component
Biological process	biological process
Sources:Amigo / QuickGO
Orthologs
Databases	NCBI: entry; OMA: entry
Species	Human	Mouse
Entrez	10069	53858
Ensembl	ENSG00000156253	ENSMUSG00000041079
UniProt	P57060	Q99M03
RefSeq (mRNA)	NM_016940; NM_001320724	NM_016924
RefSeq (protein)	NP_001307653; NP_058636	NP_058620
Location (UCSC)	Chr 21: 29 – 29.02 Mb	Chr 16: 87.23 – 87.24 Mb
PubMed search
- Wikidata
View/Edit Human	View/Edit Mouse

RWD domain-containing protein 2B is a protein that in humans is encoded by the RWDD2B gene.
