= RBM11 =

Protein-coding gene in the species Homo sapiens

Identifiers
- Aliases: RBM11, RNA binding motif protein 11
- External IDs: OMIM: 617937; MGI: 2447622; GeneCards: RBM11
Available structures
PDB	Ortholog search: PDBe RCSB
PDB	List of PDB id codes 2YWK

Gene location (Human)
Chr.	Chromosome 21 (human)
Band	21q11.2	Start	14,216,130 bp
Band	21q11.2	End	14,228,372 bp

Gene location (Mouse)
Chr.	Chromosome 16 (mouse)
Band	16|16 C3.1	Start	75,389,732 bp
Band	16|16 C3.1	End	75,399,717 bp
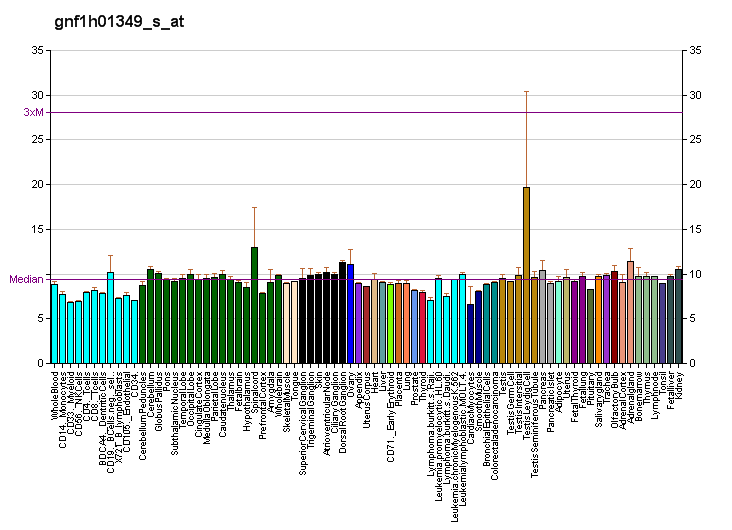

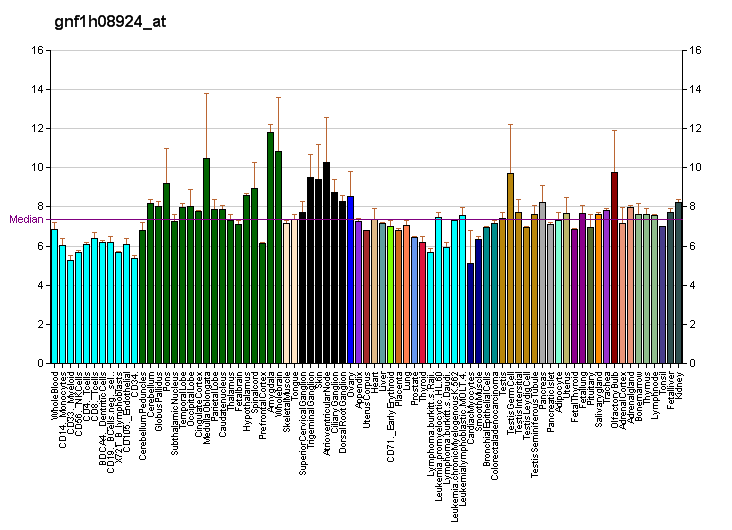
RNA expression pattern
Bgee	Human / Mouse (ortholog); Top expressed in: corpus epididymis; C1 segment; testicle; gonad; oocyte; tibial nerve; left ovary; Brodmann area 9; prefrontal cortex; secondary oocyte / Top expressed in: lumbar spinal ganglion; spermatocyte; embryo; dentate gyrus of hippocampal formation granule cell; embryo; facial motor nucleus; seminiferous tubule; primary visual cortex; ganglion of neuraxis; superior frontal gyrus; More reference expression data
BioGPS	More reference expression data
Gene ontology
Molecular function	nucleic acid binding; protein binding; protein homodimerization activity; RNA binding; poly(U) RNA binding; single-stranded RNA binding
Cellular component	nuclear speck; nucleus; nucleoplasm
Biological process	multicellular organism development; cellular response to oxidative stress; mRNA processing; cell differentiation; regulation of alternative mRNA splicing, via spliceosome; RNA splicing
Sources:Amigo / QuickGO
Orthologs
Databases	NCBI: entry; OMA: entry
Species	Human	Mouse
Entrez	54033	224344
Ensembl	ENSG00000185272	ENSMUSG00000032940
UniProt	P57052	Q80YT9
RefSeq (mRNA)	NM_144770; NM_001320602	NM_198302
RefSeq (protein)	NP_001307531; NP_658983	NP_938044
Location (UCSC)	Chr 21: 14.22 – 14.23 Mb	Chr 16: 75.39 – 75.4 Mb
PubMed search
- Wikidata
View/Edit Human	View/Edit Mouse

Splicing regulator RBM11 is a protein that is encoded by the RBM11 gene in humans.
