= RRP1 =

Protein-coding gene in the species Homo sapiens

Identifiers
- Aliases: RRP1, D21S2056E, NNP-1, NOP52, RRP1A, ribosomal RNA processing 1
- External IDs: OMIM: 610653; MGI: 1203500; GeneCards: RRP1

Gene location (Human)
Chr.	Chromosome 21 (human)
Band	21q22.3	Start	43,789,513 bp
Band	21q22.3	End	43,805,293 bp

Gene location (Mouse)
Chr.	Chromosome 10 (mouse)
Band	10 C1|10 39.72 cM	Start	78,236,218 bp
Band	10 C1|10 39.72 cM	End	78,248,877 bp
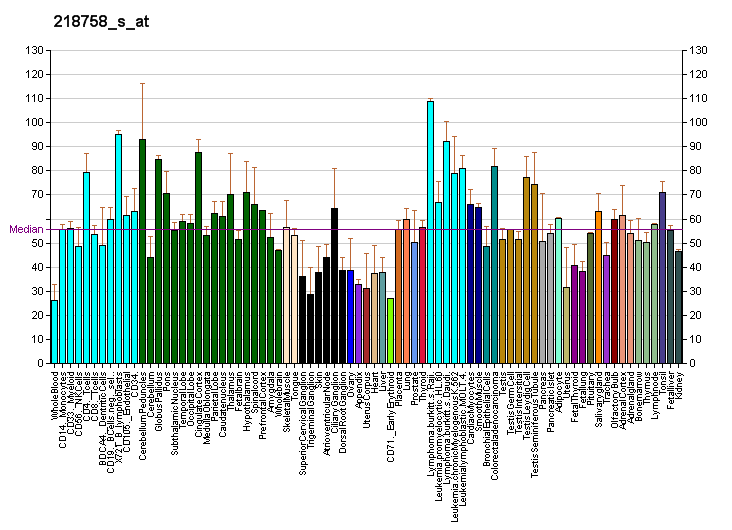
RNA expression pattern
Bgee	Human / Mouse (ortholog); Top expressed in: tendon of biceps brachii; gingival epithelium; skin of leg; buccal mucosa cell; skin of abdomen; gastrocnemius muscle; cerebellar vermis; sural nerve; prefrontal cortex; ganglionic eminence / Top expressed in: dentate gyrus of hippocampal formation granule cell; neural layer of retina; superior frontal gyrus; saccule; primary visual cortex; tail of embryo; otic vesicle; cerebellar cortex; otic placode; supraoptic nucleus; More reference expression data
BioGPS	More reference expression data
Gene ontology
Molecular function	RNA binding; protein binding
Cellular component	nucleus; nucleolus; preribosome, small subunit precursor; preribosome, large subunit precursor
Biological process	rRNA processing
Sources:Amigo / QuickGO
Orthologs
Databases	NCBI: entry; OMA: entry
Species	Human	Mouse
Entrez	8568	18114
Ensembl	ENSG00000160214	ENSMUSG00000061032
UniProt	P56182	P56183
RefSeq (mRNA)	NM_003683	NM_010925
RefSeq (protein)	NP_003674	NP_035055
Location (UCSC)	Chr 21: 43.79 – 43.81 Mb	Chr 10: 78.24 – 78.25 Mb
PubMed search
- Wikidata
View/Edit Human	View/Edit Mouse

Ribosomal RNA processing protein 1 homolog A is a protein that in humans is encoded by the RRP1 gene.

The protein encoded by this gene is the putative homolog of the yeast ribosomal RNA processing protein RRP1. The encoded protein is involved in the late stages of nucleologenesis at the end of mitosis, and may be required for the generation of 28S rRNA.
