= LTN1 =

Protein-coding gene in the species Homo sapiens

Identifiers
- Aliases: LTN1, C21orf10, C21orf98, RNF160, ZNF294, listerin E3 ubiquitin protein ligase 1
- External IDs: OMIM: 613083; MGI: 1926163; GeneCards: LTN1
Available structures
| PDB | Ortholog search: PDBe RCSB |
| PDB | List of PDB id codes 3J92 |
Enzyme activity
| EC # | BRENDA | ExPASy | KEGG | MetaCyc |
|---|---|---|---|---|
| 2.3.2.27 | ↗ | ↗ | ↗ | ↗ |

Gene location (Human)
| Chr. | Chromosome 21 (human) |
| Band | 21q21.3 | Start | 28,928,144 bp |
| Band | 21q21.3 | End | 28,992,956 bp |

Gene location (Mouse)
| Chr. | Chromosome 16 (mouse) |
| Band | 16|16 C3.3 | Start | 87,173,539 bp |
| Band | 16|16 C3.3 | End | 87,229,500 bp |
RNA expression pattern
| Bgee | Human / Mouse (ortholog); Top expressed in: secondary oocyte; decidua; biceps brachii; endothelial cell; mucosa of sigmoid colon; Skeletal muscle tissue of biceps brachii; skin of thigh; skin of hip; Skeletal muscle tissue of rectus abdominis; tail of epididymis / Top expressed in: cumulus cell; seminiferous tubule; lacrimal gland; substantia nigra; pineal gland; parotid gland; spermatid; seminal vesicula; ascending aorta; aortic valve; More reference expression data |
| BioGPS | n/a |
Gene ontology
| Molecular function | zinc ion binding; protein binding; metal ion binding; ubiquitin protein ligase activity; ubiquitin-protein transferase activity; transferase activity; ribosomal large subunit binding |
| Cellular component | cytosol; RQC complex |
| Biological process | protein ubiquitination; protein autoubiquitination; proteasome-mediated ubiquitin-dependent protein catabolic process; rescue of stalled ribosome; ribosome-associated ubiquitin-dependent protein catabolic process |
Sources:Amigo / QuickGO
Orthologs
| Databases | NCBI: entry; OMA: entry |
| Species | Human | Mouse |
| Entrez | 26046 | 78913 |
| Ensembl | ENSG00000198862 | ENSMUSG00000052299 |
| UniProt | O94822 | Q6A009 |
| RefSeq (mRNA) | NM_015565; NM_001320766 | NM_001081068 |
| RefSeq (protein) | NP_001307695; NP_056380 | NP_001074537 |
| Location (UCSC) | Chr 21: 28.93 – 28.99 Mb | Chr 16: 87.17 – 87.23 Mb |
| PubMed search |
- Wikidata
| View/Edit Human | View/Edit Mouse |

Listerin E3 ubiquitin protein ligase 1 (LTN1), otherwise known as listerin, is a protein that in humans is encoded by the LTN1 gene.

== Function ==
Like most RING finger proteins, listerin functions as an E3 ubiquitin ligase. Listerin is a component of the ribosome quality control complex.
