= H2BC12L =

Pseudogene in the species Homo sapiens

Identifiers
- Aliases: H2BC12L, H2B histone family member S, H2B/s, H2B.S histone 1, H2BFS, H2BS1, H2B clustered histone 12 like
- External IDs: GeneCards: H2BC12L

Gene location (Human)
Chr.	Chromosome 21 (human)
Band	21q22.3	Start	43,565,182 bp
Band	21q22.3	End	43,565,648 bp
RNA expression pattern
Bgee	Human / Mouse (ortholog); Top expressed in: testicle; bone marrow cell; lymph node; somatic cell; white blood cell; blood; monocyte; tibial nerve; tibial arteries; skin of leg / n/a; More reference expression data
BioGPS	n/a
Orthologs
Databases	NCBI: entry; OMA: entry
Species	Human	Mouse
Entrez	54145	n/a
Ensembl	ENSG00000234289	n/a
UniProt	n a	n/a
RefSeq (mRNA)	NM_017445	n/a
RefSeq (protein)	n/a	n/a
Location (UCSC)	Chr 21: 43.57 – 43.57 Mb	n/a
PubMed search		n/a
- Wikidata
View/Edit Human

Histone H2B type F-S is a protein that in humans is encoded by the H2BC12L gene. It's a histone H2B isoform.
