= CRYZ =

Protein-coding gene in humans

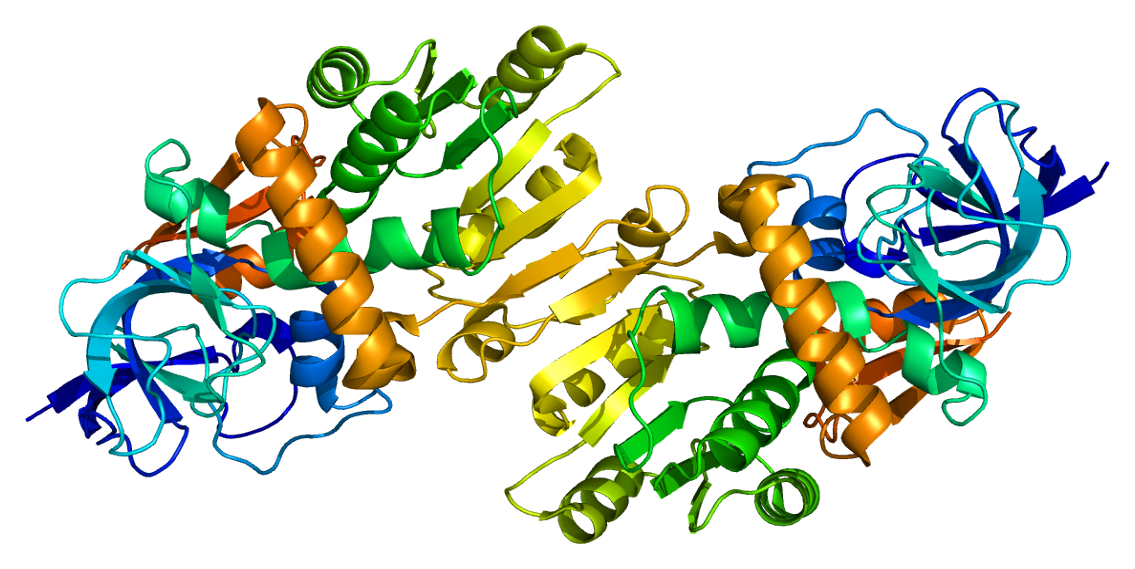

Identifiers
- Aliases: CRYZ, crystallin zeta
- External IDs: OMIM: 123691; MGI: 88527; GeneCards: CRYZ
Available structures
PDB	Ortholog search: PDBe RCSB
PDB	List of PDB id codes 1YB5
Enzyme activity
EC #	BRENDA	ExPASy	KEGG	MetaCyc
1.6.5.5	↗	↗	↗	↗

Gene location (Human)
Chr.	Chromosome 1 (human)
Band	1p31.1	Start	74,705,482 bp
Band	1p31.1	End	74,733,408 bp

Gene location (Mouse)
Chr.	Chromosome 3 (mouse)
Band	3|3 H4	Start	154,596,711 bp
Band	3|3 H4	End	154,623,182 bp
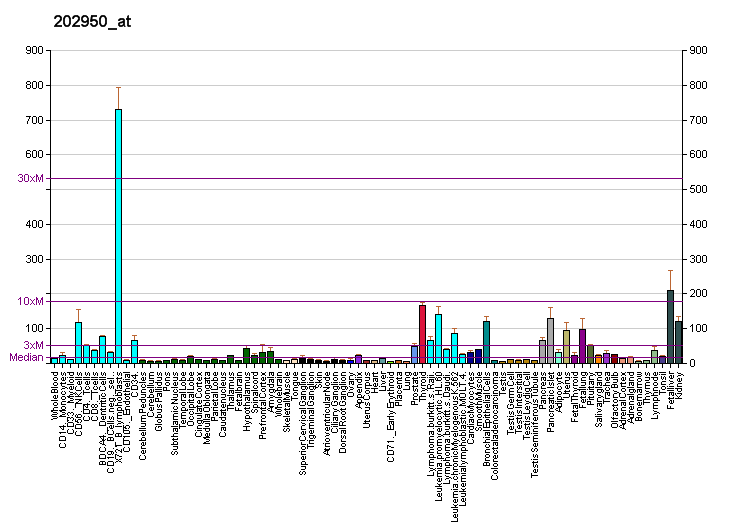
RNA expression pattern
Bgee	Human / Mouse (ortholog); Top expressed in: secondary oocyte; renal medulla; kidney tubule; right lobe of liver; corpus epididymis; caput epididymis; seminal vesicula; gallbladder; body of pancreas; human kidney / Top expressed in: retinal pigment epithelium; human kidney; right kidney; Epithelium of choroid plexus; left lobe of liver; iris; pineal gland; epithelium of lens; ciliary body; vas deferens; More reference expression data
BioGPS	More reference expression data
Gene ontology
Molecular function	oxidoreductase activity; zinc ion binding; NADPH binding; NADPH:quinone reductase activity; NADH binding; RNA binding; mRNA 3'-UTR binding
Cellular component	cytosol; extracellular exosome; cytoplasm
Biological process	protein homotetramerization; xenobiotic catabolic process; visual perception
Sources:Amigo / QuickGO
Orthologs
Databases	NCBI: entry; OMA: entry
Species	Human	Mouse
Entrez	1429	12972
Ensembl	ENSG00000116791	ENSMUSG00000028199
UniProt	Q08257	P47199
RefSeq (mRNA)	NM_001130042; NM_001130043; NM_001134759; NM_001889	NM_009968
RefSeq (protein)	NP_001123514; NP_001123515; NP_001128231; NP_001880	NP_034098; NP_001344601; NP_001344602; NP_001344603; NP_001344604 NP_001344605
Location (UCSC)	Chr 1: 74.71 – 74.73 Mb	Chr 3: 154.6 – 154.62 Mb
PubMed search
- Wikidata
View/Edit Human	View/Edit Mouse

Quinone oxidoreductase is an enzyme that in humans is encoded by the CRYZ gene.

Crystallins are separated into two classes: taxon-specific, or enzyme, and ubiquitous. The latter class constitutes the major proteins of vertebrate eye lens and maintains the transparency and refractive index of the lens. The former class is also called phylogenetically-restricted crystallins. This gene encodes a taxon-specific crystallin protein which has NADPH-dependent quinone reductase activity distinct from other known quinone reductases. It lacks alcohol dehydrogenase activity although by similarity it is considered a member of the zinc-containing alcohol dehydrogenase family. Unlike other mammalian species, in humans, lens expression is low. One pseudogene is known to exist.
