= Ubiquitinyl hydrolase 1 =

Identifiers
- EC no.: 3.4.19.12
- CAS no.: 189642-63-5&title= 86480-67-3, 189642-63-5

Databases
- IntEnz: IntEnz view
- BRENDA: BRENDA entry
- ExPASy: NiceZyme view
- KEGG: KEGG entry
- MetaCyc: metabolic pathway
- PRIAM: profile
- PDB structures: RCSB PDB PDBe PDBsum
Search
- PMC: articles
- PubMed: articles
- NCBI: proteins

Ubiquitinyl hydrolase 1 (EC 3.4.19.12, ubiquitin C-terminal hydrolase, yeast ubiquitin hydrolase) is an enzyme. This enzyme catalyses the following chemical reaction

Thiol-dependent hydrolysis of ester, thioester, amide, peptide and isopeptide bonds formed by the C-terminal Gly of ubiquitin

This enzyme hydrolyses links to polypeptides smaller than 60 residues faster than those to larger polypeptides.
