= DIP2B =

Protein-coding gene in the species Homo sapiens

Identifiers
- Aliases: DIP2B, disco interacting protein 2 homolog B
- External IDs: OMIM: 611379; MGI: 2145977; HomoloGene: 72227; GeneCards: DIP2B; OMA:DIP2B - orthologs

Gene location (Human)
Chr.	Chromosome 12 (human)
Band	12q13.12	Start	50,504,985 bp
Band	12q13.12	End	50,748,657 bp

Gene location (Mouse)
Chr.	Chromosome 15 (mouse)
Band	15|15 F1	Start	99,936,545 bp
Band	15|15 F1	End	100,117,354 bp
RNA expression pattern
Bgee	Human / Mouse (ortholog); Top expressed in: inferior ganglion of vagus nerve; cerebellar vermis; subthalamic nucleus; corpus callosum; Medulla Oblongata; superior vestibular nucleus; skin of arm; pars reticulata; Pons; external globus pallidus / Top expressed in: vestibular membrane of cochlear duct; primary oocyte; secondary oocyte; blood; perirhinal cortex; sciatic nerve; conjunctival fornix; spermatid; entorhinal cortex; cingulate gyrus; More reference expression data
BioGPS	n/a
Gene ontology
Molecular function	catalytic activity; molecular function
Cellular component	cytoplasm; extracellular exosome; membrane; nucleus
Biological process	metabolism; biological process
Sources:Amigo / QuickGO
Orthologs
Species	Human	Mouse
Entrez	57609	239667
Ensembl	ENSG00000066084	ENSMUSG00000023026
UniProt	Q9P265	Q3UH60
RefSeq (mRNA)	NM_020849; NM_173602	NM_001159361; NM_172819
RefSeq (protein)	NP_775873	NP_001152833; NP_766407; NP_001389830
Location (UCSC)	Chr 12: 50.5 – 50.75 Mb	Chr 15: 99.94 – 100.12 Mb
PubMed search
- Wikidata
View/Edit Human	View/Edit Mouse

DIP2 disco-interacting protein 2 homolog B (Drosophila) is a protein that in humans is encoded by the DIP2B gene. A member of the disco-interacting protein homolog 2 protein family, it contains a binding site for the transcriptional regulator DNA methyltransferase 1 associated protein 1, as well as AMP-binding sites. The presence of these sites suggests that DIP2B may participate in DNA methylation. This gene is located near a folate-sensitive fragile site.
