= CPT2 =

CPT2 may refer to:

- Carnitine palmitoyltransferase II, encoded by the CPT2 gene
  - Carnitine palmitoyltransferase II deficiency
- Killarney Airport, in Ontario, Canada
