= Glycoprotein N-palmitoyltransferase =

glycoprotein N-palmitoyltransferase

Identifiers
- EC no.: 2.3.1.96
- CAS no.: 97162-74-8

Databases
- IntEnz: IntEnz view
- BRENDA: BRENDA entry
- ExPASy: NiceZyme view
- KEGG: KEGG entry
- MetaCyc: metabolic pathway
- PRIAM: profile
- PDB structures: RCSB PDB PDBe PDBsum
- Gene Ontology: AmiGO / QuickGO
Search
- PMC: articles
- PubMed: articles
- NCBI: proteins

In enzymology, a glycoprotein N-palmitoyltransferase (EC 2.3.1.96) is an enzyme that catalyzes the chemical reaction

palmitoyl-CoA + glycoprotein $\rightleftharpoons$ CoA + N-palmitoylglycoprotein

Thus, the two substrates of this enzyme are palmitoyl-CoA and glycoprotein, whereas its two products are CoA and N-palmitoylglycoprotein.

This enzyme belongs to the family of transferases, specifically those acyltransferases transferring groups other than aminoacyl groups. The systematic name of this enzyme class is palmitoyl-CoA:glycoprotein N-palmitoyltransferase. This enzyme is also called mucus glycoprotein fatty acyltransferase. This enzyme participates in aminosugars metabolism. This enzyme has at least one effector, Dithiothreitol.
