= Carnitine shuttle =

Biochemical shuttle reaction

The chemical structure of carnitine

The carnitine shuttle is a biochemical reaction used to transport long chain fatty acids (LCFAs) from the cytosol into the matrix of the mitochondria so that they may be metabolized. While some fatty acids can, long chain fatty acids cannot pass through the mitochondrial membrane. However, carnitine (specifically its stereoisomer l-carnitine) can. The shuttle utilizes this to its advantage by attaching the LCFAs to carnitine. This new acyl-carnitine can pass through the membrane, after which it is split, with the newly separated carnitine being sent back out to shuttle more LCFAs, and the newly separated LCFAs undergoing beta oxidation to release their energy. The carnitine shuttle is an example of an antiporter system, and is a part of the broader class of metabolic reactions that constitute lipid metabolism. It is a highly conserved system found primarily in animals/some eukaryotes, although bacteria and plants still use carnitine for other things such as being an osmoprotectant, or being and electron acceptor in the electron transport chain. The shuttle system is implicated in many metabolic disorders, in the form of deficiencies of the enzymes in the system.

== History ==
Carnitine was discovered in 1905 from muscle tissue, and it's chemical structure and properties were described in 1927. Carnitine's role as a vital metabolic compound was first hypothesized in 1952, when it was found to be essential to growth in mealworms. Mealworms with low carnitine "died fat", because they could not metabolize their stored fat when starved. Various studies in the 1950s showed that carnitine was acetylated by acyl-CoA and stimulated beta oxidation, which led researchers to the conclusion that carnitine transports fatty acids for metabolism.

== Mechanism ==
The mechanism of the carnitine shuttle: The long chain fatty acids are shuttled via carnitine through the membrane into the mitochondria to undergo beta oxidation.

LCFAs are important to cells as they can act as stored sources of energy, signaling molecules, and as building blocks for cell membranes. Transporting these LCFAs through the cell so that they may serve these many roles is thus imperative for the cell to do. The carnitine shuttle evolved as a way for cells to be able transport LCFAs to the many places they are needed for these roles. The LCFA's are synthesized, or absorbed. Carnitine is similarly either synthesized, or absorbed. The acyl-CoA comes from Acyl-CoA synthetase.

The shuttle's mechanism is as follows:

1. Carnitine palmitoyltransferase I (CPT I) transfers the LCFAs from coenzyme A (CoA) to the hydroxyl group of the carnitine (from translocase in step 2) to make acyl-carnitine. This happens in the cytosol-facing outer membrane. The acyl-carnitine diffuses through the membrane into the intermembrane space for step two. Three types of this enzyme exist in humans: CPT IA (Found in the liver), CPT IB (found in the muscle), and CPT IC (found in the brain). This is the rate limiting step.
2. Carnitine-acylcarnitine translocase (CACT), also known as SLC25A20, transfers acyl-carnitine to the matrix while carnitine from CPT 2 in the matrix is transferred out to CPT I in order to shuttle more LCFA's in step 1. This happens in the intermembrane space.
3. Finally, carnitine palmitoyltransferase II (CPT II) transfers the LCFAs from carnitine to CoA to make fatty-acyl CoA while transporting out the carnitine to translocase and eventually CPT I to restart the cycle and shuttle more LCFA's. This happens in the mitochondrial matrix.

The acyl-CoA is then metabolized via beta oxidation. The shuttle is regulated at the CPT-I level, being inhibited by malonyl-CoA from beta oxidation, preventing a futile cycle. Post-translational modifications, upregulation of the genes encoding the shuttle's enzymes, and cellular carnitine levels also regulate the shuttle. Only eukaryotes with membrane-bound organelles have the shuttle, as organisms with no organelles have no membranes to shuttle LCFAs into.

== Clinical Significance ==
Diseases affecting the carnitine shuttle include carnitine palmitoyltransferase I deficiency, carnitine palmitoyltransferase II deficiency, and carnitine-acylcarnitine translocase deficiency, among others. A common symptom among them includes fatigue that presents as an intolerance to physical exertion, with symptoms varying wildly between the main three. Treatment usually consists of dietary supplements, avoidance of fasting and prolonged exercise, and treatment of complications, such as myoglobinuria, hypoglycemia, and hepatic dysfunction. CPT1A has also been investigated as a therapeutic target in cancer. In prostate cancer models, inhibition of CPT1A by the cisplatin prodrug Platin-L suppressed fatty-acid oxidation and increased cellular dependence on glucose.

== See also ==
- Carnitine
- Fatty Acid
- Lipid Metabolism
- Beta Oxidation
