= CROT (gene) =

Protein-coding gene in the species Homo sapiens

Identifiers
- Aliases: CROT, COT, carnitine O-octanoyltransferase
- External IDs: OMIM: 606090; MGI: 1921364; GeneCards: CROT
Available structures
PDB	Ortholog search: PDBe RCSB
PDB	List of PDB id codes 1XL7, 1XL8, 1XMC, 1XMD
Enzyme activity
EC #	BRENDA	ExPASy	KEGG	MetaCyc
2.3.1.137	↗	↗	↗	↗

Gene location (Human)
Chr.	Chromosome 7 (human)
Band	7q21.12	Start	87,345,664 bp
Band	7q21.12	End	87,399,794 bp

Gene location (Mouse)
Chr.	Chromosome 5 (mouse)
Band	5|5 A1	Start	9,016,033 bp
Band	5|5 A1	End	9,047,324 bp
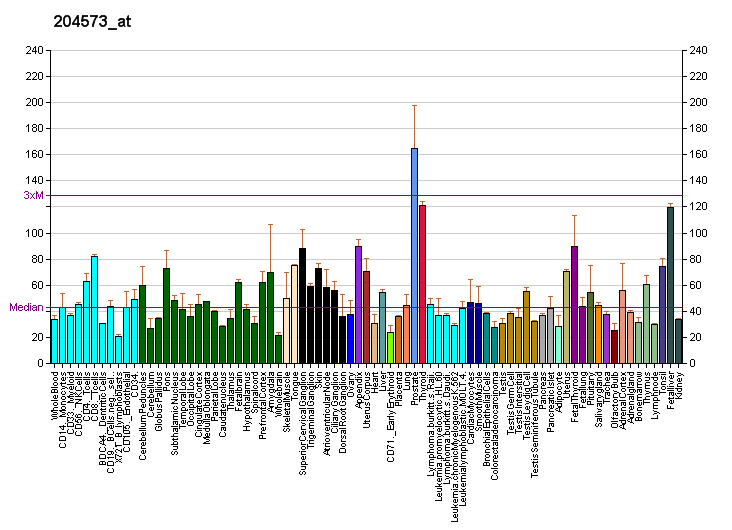
RNA expression pattern
Bgee	Human / Mouse (ortholog); Top expressed in: seminal vesicula; jejunal mucosa; mucosa of urinary bladder; skin of thigh; duodenum; palpebral conjunctiva; urethra; hair follicle; gingival epithelium; epithelium of nasopharynx / Top expressed in: left lobe of liver; right kidney; human kidney; epithelium of small intestine; proximal tubule; lacrimal gland; jejunum; esophagus; duodenum; ileum; More reference expression data
BioGPS	More reference expression data
Gene ontology
Molecular function	transferase activity; signaling receptor binding; acyltransferase activity; carnitine O-octanoyltransferase activity
Cellular component	intracellular membrane-bounded organelle; peroxisome; peroxisomal matrix; cytosol
Biological process	medium-chain fatty acid metabolic process; coenzyme A metabolic process; lipid metabolism; fatty acid transport; generation of precursor metabolites and energy; fatty acid metabolic process; fatty acid beta-oxidation using acyl-CoA oxidase; fatty acid beta-oxidation; carnitine metabolic process; protein targeting to peroxisome
Sources:Amigo / QuickGO
Orthologs
Databases	NCBI: entry; OMA: entry
Species	Human	Mouse
Entrez	54677	74114
Ensembl	ENSG00000005469	ENSMUSG00000003623
UniProt	Q9UKG9	Q9DC50
RefSeq (mRNA)	NM_001143935; NM_001243745; NM_021151	NM_023733
RefSeq (protein)	NP_001137407; NP_001230674; NP_066974	NP_076222
Location (UCSC)	Chr 7: 87.35 – 87.4 Mb	Chr 5: 9.02 – 9.05 Mb
PubMed search
- Wikidata
View/Edit Human	View/Edit Mouse

Peroxisomal carnitine O-octanoyltransferase is an enzyme that in humans is encoded by the CROT gene.

Carnitine octanoyltransferase (EC 2.3.1.137) is a carnitine acyltransferase that catalyzes the reversible transfer of fatty acyl groups between CoA and carnitine. This enzyme regulates the breakdown of Very Long Chain Fatty Acids (VLCFA) by performing a crucial step in the transport of medium length acyl chains out of the mammalian peroxisome to the cytosol and mitochondria for further breakdown. See also CRAT (MIM 600184). Van der Leij et al. (2000) reviewed the function, structural features, and phylogenetics of human carnitine acyltransferase genes, including CROT.[supplied by OMIM]
