= Fatty acid degradation =

Metabolic process

Fatty acid degradation is the process in which fatty acids are broken down into their metabolites, in the end generating acetyl-CoA, the entry molecule for the citric acid cycle, the main energy supply of living organisms, including bacteria and animals. It includes three major steps:

- Lipolysis of and release from adipose tissue
- Activation and transport into mitochondria
- β-oxidation

== Lipolysis and release ==
Initially in the process of degradation, fatty acids are stored in adipocytes. The breakdown of this fat is known as lipolysis. The products of lipolysis, free fatty acids, are released into the bloodstream and circulate throughout the body. During the breakdown of triacylglycerols into fatty acids, more than 75% of the fatty acids are converted back into triacylglycerol, a natural mechanism to conserve energy, even in cases of starvation and exercise.

== Activation and transport into mitochondria ==
Fatty acids must be activated before they can be carried into the mitochondria, where fatty acid oxidation occurs. This process occurs in two steps catalyzed by the enzyme fatty acyl-CoA synthetase.

=== Formation of an activated thioester bond ===
The enzyme first catalyzes nucleophilic attack on the α-phosphate of ATP to form pyrophosphate and an acyl chain linked to AMP. The next step is formation of an activated thioester bond between the fatty acyl chain and Coenzyme A.

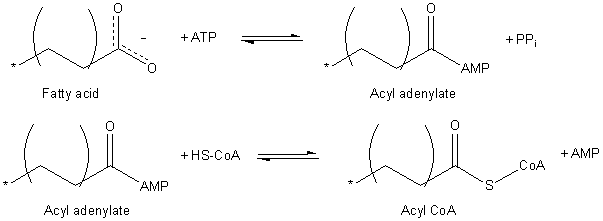

The balanced equation for the above is:

RCOO^{−} + CoASH + ATP → RCO-SCoA + AMP + PP_{i}
This two-step reaction is freely reversible and its equilibrium lies near 1. To drive the reaction forward, the reaction is coupled to a strongly exergonic hydrolysis reaction: the enzyme inorganic pyrophosphatase cleaves the pyrophosphate liberated from ATP to two phosphate ions, consuming one water molecule in the process. Thus the net reaction becomes:

RCOO^{−} + CoASH + ATP → RCO-SCoA+ AMP + 2P_{i}

=== Transport into the mitochondrial matrix ===
The inner mitochondrial membrane is impermeable to fatty acids and a specialized carnitine carrier system operates to transport activated fatty acids from cytosol to mitochondria.

Once activated, the acyl CoA is transported into the mitochondrial matrix. This occurs via a series of similar steps:

1. Acyl CoA is conjugated to carnitine by carnitine acyltransferase I (palmitoyltransferase) I located on the outer mitochondrial membrane
2. Acyl carnitine is shuttled inside by a translocase
3. Acyl carnitine (such as Palmitoylcarnitine) is converted to acyl CoA by carnitine acyltransferase (palmitoyltransferase) II located on the inner mitochondrial membrane. The liberated carnitine returns to the cytosol.

Carnitine acyltransferase I undergoes allosteric inhibition as a result of malonyl-CoA, an intermediate in fatty acid biosynthesis, in order to prevent futile cycling between beta-oxidation and fatty acid synthesis.

The mitochondrial oxidation of fatty acids takes place in three major steps:

1. β-oxidation occurs to convert fatty acids into 2-carbon acetyl-CoA units.
2. Acetyl-CoA enters into TCA cycle to yield generate reduced NADH and reduced FADH_{2}.
3. Reduced cofactors NADH and FADH_{2} participate in the electron transport chain in the mitochondria to yield ATP. There is no direct participation of the fatty acid.

== β-oxidation ==
After activation by ATP, once inside the mitochondria, the β-oxidation of a fatty acids occurs via four recurring steps:

1. Oxidation by FAD
2. Hydration
3. Oxidation by NAD^{+}
4. Thiolysis
5. Production of acyl-CoA and acetyl-CoA

The final product of β-oxidation of an even-numbered fatty acid is acetyl-CoA, the entry molecule for the citric acid cycle. If the fatty acid is an odd-numbered chain, the final product of β-oxidation will be propionyl-CoA. This propionyl-CoA will be converted into intermediate methylmalonyl-CoA and eventually succinyl-CoA, which also enters the TCA cycle.

== See also ==
- Reverse cholesterol transport
