= Ecdysone O-acyltransferase =

Class of enzymes

ecdysone O-acyltransferase

Identifiers
- EC no.: 2.3.1.139
- CAS no.: 120038-26-8

Databases
- IntEnz: IntEnz view
- BRENDA: BRENDA entry
- ExPASy: NiceZyme view
- KEGG: KEGG entry
- MetaCyc: metabolic pathway
- PRIAM: profile
- PDB structures: RCSB PDB PDBe PDBsum
- Gene Ontology: AmiGO / QuickGO
Search
- PMC: articles
- PubMed: articles
- NCBI: proteins

In enzymology, an ecdysone O-acyltransferase (EC 2.3.1.139) is an enzyme that catalyzes the chemical reaction

palmitoyl-CoA + ecdysone $\rightleftharpoons$ CoA + ecdysone palmitate

Thus, the two substrates of this enzyme are palmitoyl-CoA and ecdysone, whereas its two products are CoA and ecdysone palmitate.

This enzyme belongs to the family of transferases, specifically those acyltransferases transferring groups other than aminoacyl groups. The systematic name of this enzyme class is palmitoyl-CoA:ecdysone palmitoyltransferase. Other names in common use include acyl-CoA:ecdysone acyltransferase, and fatty acyl-CoA:ecdysone acyltransferase.
