= (myelin-proteolipid) O-palmitoyltransferase =

Class of enzymes

myelin-proteolipid O-palmitoyltransferase

Identifiers
- EC no.: 2.3.1.100
- CAS no.: 82657-98-5

Databases
- IntEnz: IntEnz view
- BRENDA: BRENDA entry
- ExPASy: NiceZyme view
- KEGG: KEGG entry
- MetaCyc: metabolic pathway
- PRIAM: profile
- PDB structures: RCSB PDB PDBe PDBsum
- Gene Ontology: AmiGO / QuickGO
Search
- PMC: articles
- PubMed: articles
- NCBI: proteins

In enzymology, a [myelin-proteolipid] O-palmitoyltransferase (EC 2.3.1.100) is an enzyme that catalyzes the chemical reaction

palmitoyl-CoA + [myelin proteolipid] $\rightleftharpoons$ CoA + O-palmitoyl-[myelin proteolipid]

Thus, the two substrates of this enzyme are palmitoyl-CoA and myelin proteolipid, whereas its two products are CoA and O-palmitoyl-myelin proteolipid.

This enzyme belongs to the family of transferases, specifically those acyltransferases transferring groups other than aminoacyl groups. The systematic name of this enzyme class is palmitoyl-CoA:[myelin-proteolipid] O-palmitoyltransferase. Other names in common use include myelin PLP acyltransferase, acyl-protein synthetase, and myelin-proteolipid O-palmitoyltransferase.
