= CROT =

CROT may refer to:

- CROT (gene), which encodes the enzyme peroxisomal carnitine O-octanoyltransferase
- C-ROT gate, a component in quantum logic computers
