= Dolichol O-acyltransferase =

dolichol O-acyltransferase

Identifiers
- EC no.: 2.3.1.123
- CAS no.: 111839-04-4

Databases
- IntEnz: IntEnz view
- BRENDA: BRENDA entry
- ExPASy: NiceZyme view
- KEGG: KEGG entry
- MetaCyc: metabolic pathway
- PRIAM: profile
- PDB structures: RCSB PDB PDBe PDBsum
- Gene Ontology: AmiGO / QuickGO
Search
- PMC: articles
- PubMed: articles
- NCBI: proteins

In enzymology, a dolichol O-acyltransferase (EC 2.3.1.123) is an enzyme that catalyzes the chemical reaction

palmitoyl-CoA + dolichol $\rightleftharpoons$ CoA + dolichyl palmitate

Thus, the two substrates of this enzyme are palmitoyl-CoA and dolichol, whereas its two products are CoA and dolichyl palmitate.

This enzyme belongs to the family of transferases, specifically those acyltransferases transferring groups other than aminoacyl groups. The systematic name of this enzyme class is palmitoyl-CoA:dolichol O-palmitoyltransferase. This enzyme is also called acyl-CoA:dolichol acyltransferase.
