= Glycoprotein O-fatty-acyltransferase =

glycoprotein O-fatty-acyltransferase

Identifiers
- EC no.: 2.3.1.142
- CAS no.: 122191-29-1

Databases
- IntEnz: IntEnz view
- BRENDA: BRENDA entry
- ExPASy: NiceZyme view
- KEGG: KEGG entry
- MetaCyc: metabolic pathway
- PRIAM: profile
- PDB structures: RCSB PDB PDBe PDBsum
- Gene Ontology: AmiGO / QuickGO
Search
- PMC: articles
- PubMed: articles
- NCBI: proteins

In enzymology, a glycoprotein O-fatty-acyltransferase (EC 2.3.1.142) is an enzyme that catalyzes the chemical reaction

palmitoyl-CoA + mucus glycoprotein $\rightleftharpoons$ CoA + O-palmitoylglycoprotein

Thus, the two substrates of this enzyme are palmitoyl-CoA and mucus glycoprotein, whereas its two products are CoA and O-palmitoylglycoprotein.

This enzyme belongs to the family of transferases, specifically those acyltransferases transferring groups other than aminoacyl groups. The systematic name of this enzyme class is fatty-acyl-CoA:mucus-glycoprotein fatty-acyltransferase. This enzyme is also called protein acyltransferase.
