= Carnitine O-palmitoyltransferase =

Choline/Carnitine o-acyltransferase
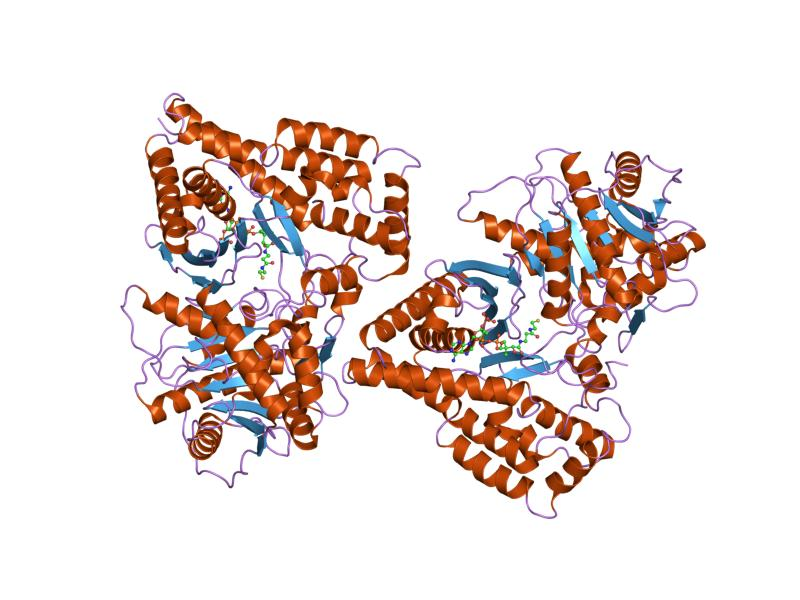
- Structure of carnitine acetyltransferase.

Identifiers
- Symbol: Carn_acyltransf
- Pfam: PF00755
- Pfam clan: CL0149
- InterPro: IPR000542
- PROSITE: PDOC00402
- SCOP2: 1ndi / SCOPe / SUPFAM
- OPM superfamily: 83
- OPM protein: 2h3u
Available protein structures:
- Pfam: structures / ECOD
- PDB: RCSB PDB; PDBe; PDBj
- PDBsum: structure summary

Carnitine O-palmitoyltransferase (also called carnitine palmitoyltransferase) is a mitochondrial transferase enzyme (EC 2.3.1.21) involved in the metabolism of palmitoylcarnitine into palmitoyl-CoA. A related transferase is carnitine acyltransferase.

== Molecules ==
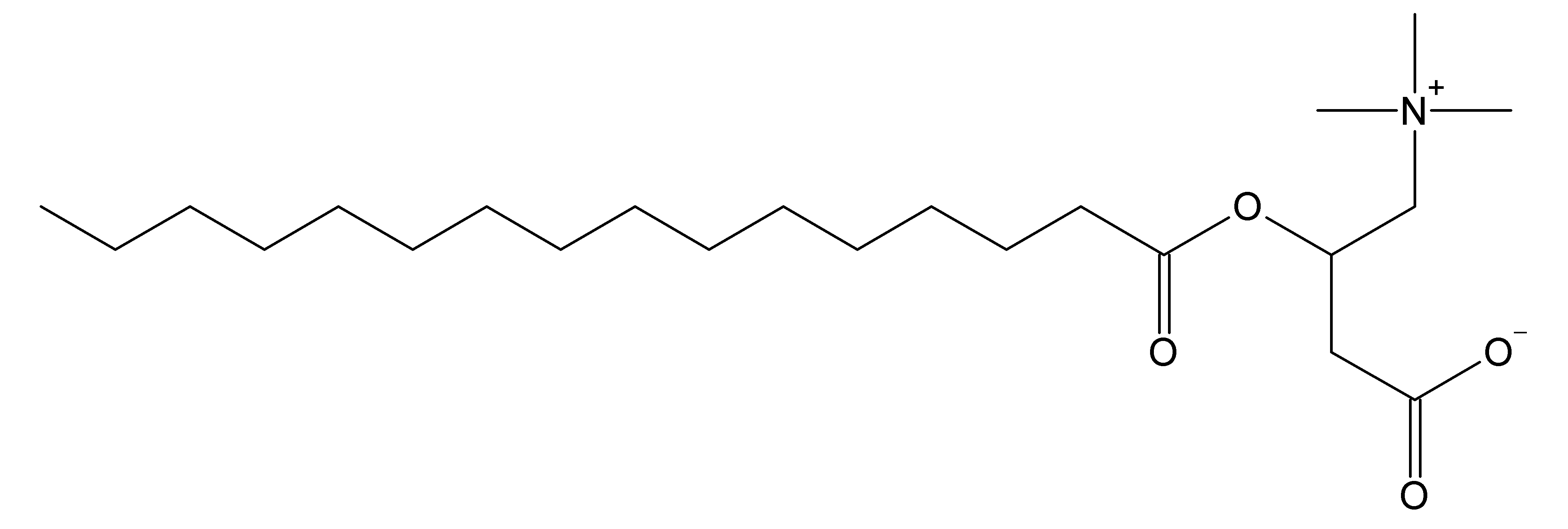
Palmitoylcarnitine

Palmitoyl CoA

== Human forms ==
There are four different forms of CPT in humans:

- CPT1A – associated with Carnitine palmitoyltransferase I deficiency
- CPT1B
- CPT1C
- CPT2 – associated with carnitine palmitoyltransferase II deficiency

== See also ==
- Fatty acid degradation § Transport into the mitochondrial matrix
