= Palmitoylcarnitine =

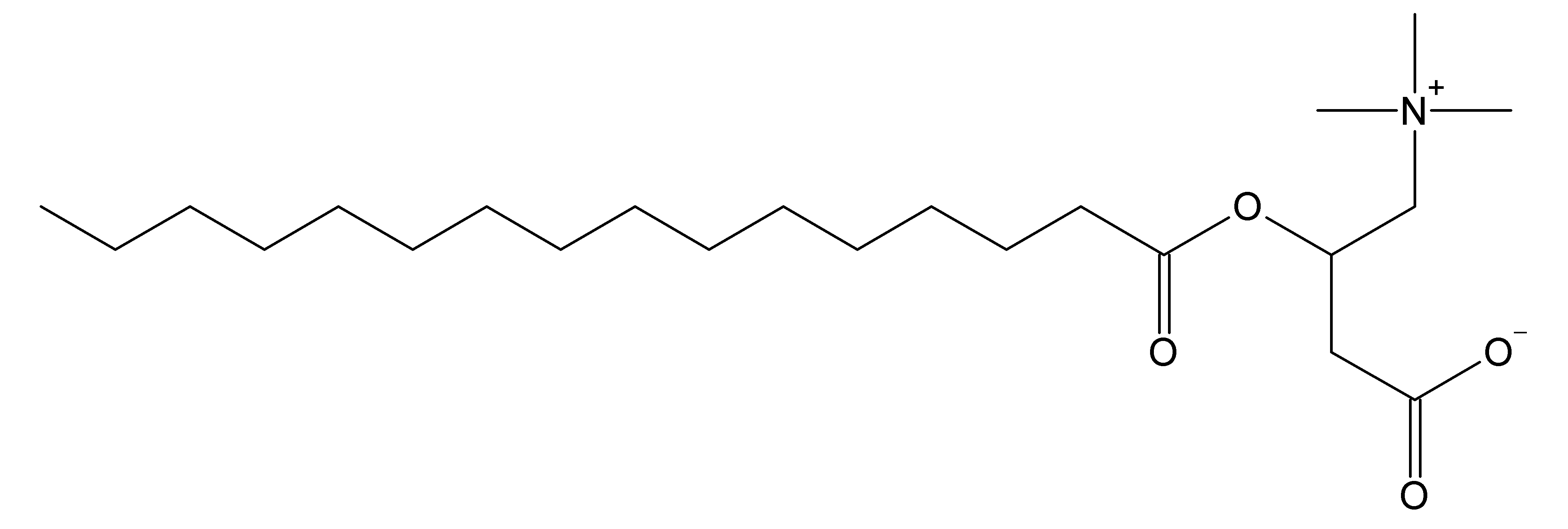

Names
- IUPAC name 3-(palmitoyloxy)-4-(trimethylammonio)butanoate

Identifiers
CAS Number	1935-18-8
3D model (JSmol)	Interactive image
ChEMBL	ChEMBL301722
ChemSpider	448
MeSH	Palmitoylcarnitine
PubChem CID	461
UNII	U8K6DKA8V2
CompTox Dashboard (EPA)	DTXSID90895028
- InChI: InChI=1S/C23H45NO4/c1-5-6-7-8-9-10-11-12-13-14-15-16-17-18-23(27)28-21(19-22(25)26)20-24(2,3)4/h21H,5-20H2,1-4H3 Key: XOMRRQXKHMYMOC-UHFFFAOYSA-N; InChI=1/C23H45NO4/c1-5-6-7-8-9-10-11-12-13-14-15-16-17-18-23(27)28-21(19-22(25)26)20-24(2,3)4/h21H,5-20H2,1-4H3 Key: XOMRRQXKHMYMOC-UHFFFAOYAU
- SMILES: [O-]C(=O)CC(OC(=O)CCCCCCCCCCCCCCC)C[N+](C)(C)C

Properties
Chemical formula	C_{23}H_{45}NO_{4}
Molar mass	399.608 g/mol
- Except where otherwise noted, data are given for materials in their standard state (at 25 °C [77 °F], 100 kPa). verify (what is ?) Infobox references

Palmitoylcarnitine is an ester derivative of carnitine involved in the metabolism of fatty acids. During the tricarboxylic acid cycle (TCA), fatty acids undergo a process known as β-oxidation to produce energy in the form of ATP. β-oxidation occurs primarily within mitochondria, however the mitochondrial membrane prevents the entry of long chain fatty acids (>C10), so the conversion of fatty acids such as palmitic acid is key. Palmitic acid is brought to the cell and once inside the cytoplasm is first converted to Palmitoyl-CoA. Palmitoyl-CoA has the ability to freely pass the outer mitochondrial membrane, but the inner membrane is impermeable to the Acyl-CoA and thioester forms of various long-chain fatty acids such as palmitic acid. The palmitoyl-CoA is then enzymatically transformed into palmitoylcarnitine via the Carnitine O-palmitoyltransferase family. The palmitoylcarnitine is then actively transferred into the inner membrane of the mitochondria via the carnitine-acylcarnitine translocase. Once inside the inner mitochondrial membrane, the same Carnitine O-palmitoyltransferase family is then responsible for transforming the palmitoylcarnitine back to the palmitoyl-CoA form.

== Structure ==
Chemical Structure of Palmitic Acid

Palmitoylcarnitine contains the saturated fatty acid known as palmitic acid (C16:0) which is bound to the β-hydroxy group of the carnitine. The core carnitine structure, consisting of butanoate with a quaternary ammonium attached to C4 and hydroxy group at C3, is a common molecular backbone for the transfer of multiple long chain fatty acids in the TCA cycle.

== Function ==
=== Energy Generation ===
Palmitoylcarnitine is one molecule in a family of ester derivatives of carnitine that are utilized in the TCA cycle to generate energy. The beta oxidation yields 7 NADH, 7 FADH2, and 8 Acetyl-CoA chains. This Acetyl-CoA generates 3 NADH, 1 FADH2, and 1 GTP for every molecule in the TCA cycle. Each NADH generates 2.5 ATP in the ETC and FADH2 generates 1.5 ATP. This totals to 108 ATP, but 2 ATP are consumed to generate the initial Palmitoyl-CoA, leaving a net gain of 106 ATP.

=== Clinical Significance ===
Palmitoylcarnitine has demonstrated potential as a diagnostic marker in newborns for the medical condition of primary carnitine deficiency.

Levels of palmitoylcarnitine (palcar) demonstrated significant correlation with dihydrotestosterone (DHT) and its effects in prostate cancer models, suggesting a similar role between the two molecules.

== See also ==
- Carnitine O-palmitoyltransferase
