= Carnitine palmitoyltransferase II =

Mammalian protein found in humans

CPT2

Identifiers
- Aliases: CPT2, CPT1, CPTASE, IIAE4, carnitine palmitoyltransferase 2
- External IDs: OMIM: 600650; MGI: 109176; GeneCards: CPT2
Enzyme activity
EC #	BRENDA	ExPASy	KEGG	MetaCyc
2.3.1.21	↗	↗	↗	↗

Gene location (Human)
Chr.	Chromosome 1 (human)
Band	1p32.3	Start	53,196,792 bp
Band	1p32.3	End	53,214,197 bp

Gene location (Mouse)
Chr.	Chromosome 4 (mouse)
Band	4 C7|4 50.18 cM	Start	107,761,178 bp
Band	4 C7|4 50.18 cM	End	107,780,807 bp
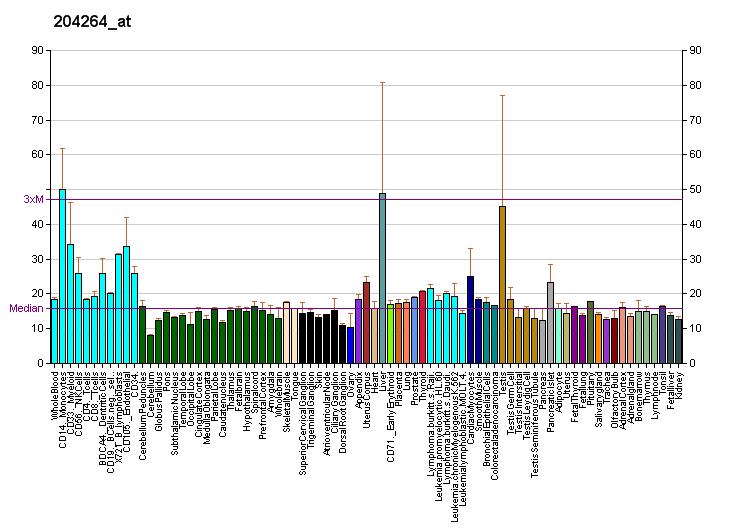

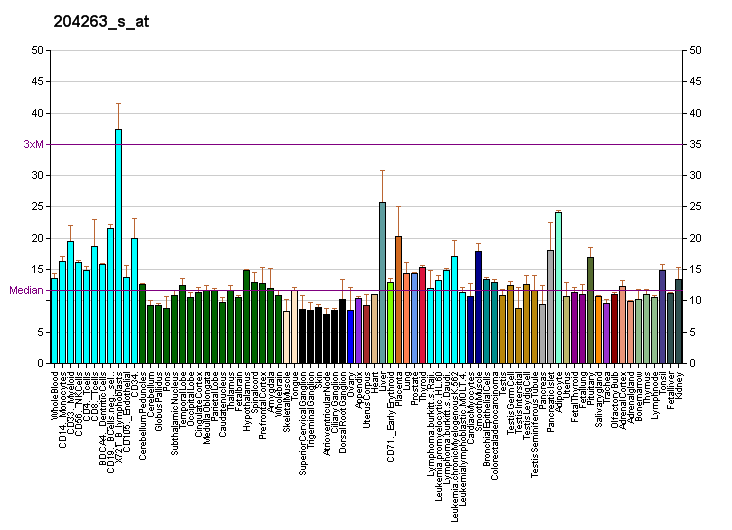
RNA expression pattern
Bgee	Human / Mouse (ortholog); Top expressed in: mucosa of transverse colon; jejunal mucosa; right lobe of liver; rectum; gingival epithelium; right adrenal gland; palpebral conjunctiva; right adrenal cortex; duodenum; germinal epithelium / Top expressed in: brown adipose tissue; myocardium of ventricle; right ventricle; cardiac muscles; cardiac muscle tissue of left ventricle; interventricular septum; left lobe of liver; intercostal muscle; pyloric antrum; epithelium of stomach; More reference expression data
BioGPS	More reference expression data
Gene ontology
Molecular function	acyltransferase activity; transferase activity; carnitine O-palmitoyltransferase activity
Cellular component	membrane; nucleolus; nucleoplasm; mitochondrion; mitochondrial inner membrane
Biological process	carnitine shuttle; fatty acid metabolic process; lipid metabolism; fatty acid beta-oxidation; regulation of lipid metabolic process; positive regulation of cold-induced thermogenesis
Sources:Amigo / QuickGO
Orthologs
Databases	NCBI: entry; OMA: entry
Species	Human	Mouse
Entrez	1376	12896
Ensembl	ENSG00000157184	ENSMUSG00000028607
UniProt	P23786	P52825
RefSeq (mRNA)	NM_000098; NM_001330589	NM_009949
RefSeq (protein)	NP_000089; NP_001317518	NP_034079
Location (UCSC)	Chr 1: 53.2 – 53.21 Mb	Chr 4: 107.76 – 107.78 Mb
PubMed search
- Wikidata
View/Edit Human	View/Edit Mouse

Carnitine O-palmitoyltransferase 2, mitochondrial is an enzyme that in humans is encoded by the CPT2 gene.

== Function ==
Carnitine palmitoyltransferase II precursor (CPT2) is a mitochondrial membrane protein which is transported to the mitochondrial inner membrane. CPT2 together with carnitine palmitoyltransferase I oxidizes long-chain fatty acids in the mitochondria. Defects in this gene are associated with mitochondrial long-chain fatty-acid (LCFA) oxidation disorders and carnitine palmitoyltransferase II deficiency.

Acyl-CoA from cytosol to the mitochondrial matrix

== See also ==
- Carnitine palmitoyltransferase I
