= Carnitine O-acetyltransferase =

Enzyme

CRAT

Identifiers
- Aliases: CRAT, carnitine O-acetyltransferase, CAT1, CAT, NBIA8
- External IDs: OMIM: 600184; MGI: 109501; GeneCards: CRAT
Available structures
PDB	Ortholog search: PDBe RCSB
PDB	List of PDB id codes 1NM8, 1S5O

Gene location (Human)
Chr.	Chromosome 9 (human)
Band	9q34.11	Start	129,094,142 bp
Band	9q34.11	End	129,111,189 bp

Gene location (Mouse)
Chr.	Chromosome 2 (mouse)
Band	2 B|2 21.69 cM	Start	30,400,471 bp
Band	2 B|2 21.69 cM	End	30,415,813 bp

RNA expression pattern
Bgee	Human / Mouse (ortholog); Top expressed in: sperm; left testis; right testis; skin of thigh; muscle of thigh; gastrocnemius muscle; pancreatic ductal cell; Skeletal muscle tissue of rectus abdominis; right lobe of liver; thoracic diaphragm / Top expressed in: muscle of thigh; spermatocyte; soleus muscle; spermatid; medial head of gastrocnemius muscle; brown adipose tissue; seminiferous tubule; sternocleidomastoid muscle; digastric muscle; triceps brachii muscle; More reference expression data
BioGPS	More reference expression data
Gene ontology
Molecular function	transferase activity; acyltransferase activity; signaling receptor binding; carnitine O-acetyltransferase activity
Cellular component	mitochondrial inner membrane; peroxisome; peroxisomal matrix; endoplasmic reticulum; membrane; mitochondrion; cytosol
Biological process	fatty acid beta-oxidation using acyl-CoA oxidase; fatty acid metabolic process; lipid metabolism; carnitine metabolic process, CoA-linked; transport; protein targeting to peroxisome
Sources:Amigo / QuickGO
Orthologs
Databases	NCBI: entry; OMA: entry
Species	Human	Mouse
Entrez	1384	12908
Ensembl	ENSG00000095321	ENSMUSG00000026853
UniProt	P43155	P47934
RefSeq (mRNA)	NM_000755; NM_001257363; NM_004003; NM_144782; NM_001346546 NM_001346547; NM_001346548; NM_001346549	NM_007760
RefSeq (protein)	NP_000746; NP_001244292; NP_001333475; NP_001333476; NP_001333477 NP_001333478; NP_003994	NP_031786
Location (UCSC)	Chr 9: 129.09 – 129.11 Mb	Chr 2: 30.4 – 30.42 Mb
PubMed search
- Wikidata
View/Edit Human	View/Edit Mouse

Carnitine O-acetyltransferase also called carnitine acetyltransferase (CRAT, or CAT) (EC 2.3.1.7) is an enzyme that encoded by the CRAT gene that catalyzes the chemical reaction

acetyl-CoA + carnitine $\rightleftharpoons$ CoA + acetylcarnitine

where the acetyl group displaces the hydrogen atom in the central hydroxyl group of carnitine.

Thus, the two substrates of this enzyme are acetyl-CoA and carnitine, whereas its two products are CoA and O-acetylcarnitine. The reaction is highly reversible and does not depend on the order in which substrates bind.

Different subcellular localizations of the CRAT mRNAs are thought to result from alternative splicing of the CRAT gene suggested by the divergent sequences in the 5' region of peroxisomal and mitochondrial CRAT cDNAs and the location of an intron where the sequences diverge. The alternatively splicing of this gene results in three distinct isoforms, one of which contains an N-terminal mitochondrial transit peptide, and has been shown to be located in mitochondria.

== Nomenclature ==
This enzyme belongs to the family of transferases, to be specific those acyltransferases transferring groups other than aminoacyl groups. The systematic name of this enzyme class is acetyl-CoA:carnitine O-acetyltransferase. Other names in common use include acetyl-CoA-carnitine O-acetyltransferase, acetylcarnitine transferase, carnitine acetyl coenzyme A transferase, carnitine acetylase, carnitine acetyltransferase, carnitine-acetyl-CoA transferase, and CATC. This enzyme participates in alanine and aspartate metabolism.

== Structure ==
In general, carnitine acetyltransferases have molecular weights of about 70 kDa, and contain approximately 600 residues1. CRAT contains two domains, an N domain and a C domain, and is composed of 20 α helices and 16 β strands. The N domain consists of an eight-stranded β sheet flanked on both sides by eight α helices. A six-stranded mixed β sheet and eleven α helices comprise the enzyme’s C domain.

When compared, the cores of the two domains reflect significantly similar peptide backbone folding. This occurs despite the fact that only 4% of the amino acids that comprise those peptide backbones corresponds to one another.

=== Active site ===
His343 is the catalytic residue in CRAT. It is located at the interface between the enzyme’s C and N domains towards the heart of CRAT. His343 is accessible via two 15-18 Å channels that approach the residue from opposite ends of the CRAT enzyme. These channels are utilized by the substrates of CRAT, one channel for carnitine, and one for CoA. The side chain of His343 is positioned irregularly, with the δ^{1} ring nitrogen hydrogen bonded to the carbonyl oxygen on the amino acid backbone.

=== CoA binding site ===
Due to the fact that CRAT binds CoA, rather than acetyl-CoA, it appears that CRAT possesses the ability to hydrolyze acetyl-CoA, before interacting with the lone CoA fragment at the binding site. CoA is bound in a linear conformation with its pantothenic arm binding at the active site. Here, the pantothenic arm’s terminal thiol group and the ε^{2} nitrogen on the catalytic His343 side chain form a hydrogen bond. The 3’-phosphate on CoA forms interactions with residues Lys419 and Lys423. Also at the binding site, the residues Asp430 and Glu453 form a direct hydrogen bond to one another. If either residue exhibits a mutation, can result in a decrease in CRAT activity.

=== Carnitine binding site ===
Carnitine binds to CRAT in a partially folded state, with its hydroxyl group and carboxyl group facing opposite directions. The site itself is composed of the C domain β sheet and particular residues from the N domain. Upon binding, a face of carnitine is left exposed to the space outside the enzyme. Like CoA, carnitine forms a hydrogen bond with the ε2 nitrogen on His343. In the case of carnitine, the bond is formed with its 3-hydroxyl group. This CRAT catalysis is stereospecific for carnitine, as the stereoisomer of the 3-hydroxyl group cannot sufficiently interact with the CRAT carnitine binding site. CRAT undergoes minor conformational changes upon binding with carnitine.

== Function ==
=== Enzyme mechanism ===
carnitine O-acetyltransferase
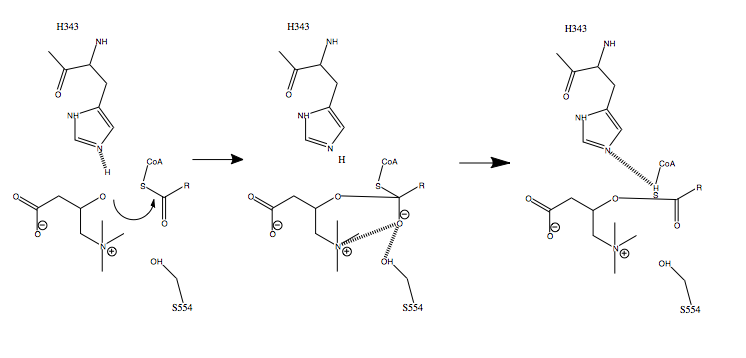
- transferase Mechanism (His343)

Identifiers
- EC no.: 2.3.1.7
- CAS no.: 9029-90-7

Databases
- BRENDA: enzyme data
- ExPASy: NiceZyme view
- KEGG: enzyme entry
- MetaCyc: metabolic pathway
- Rhea: reactions
- PDB structures: RCSB PDB PDBe PDBsum
- Gene Ontology: AmiGO / QuickGO
Search
- PMC: articles
- PubMed: articles
- NCBI: proteins

The His343 residue at the active site of CRAT acts as a base that is able to deprotonate the CoA thiol group or the Carnitine 3’-hydroxyl group depending on the direction of the reaction. The structure of CRAT optimizes this reaction by causing direct hydrogen bonding between the His343 and both substrates. The deprotonated group is now free to attack the acetyl group of acetyl-CoA or acetylcarnitine at its carbonyl site. The reaction proceeds directly, without the formation of a His343-acetyl intermediate.

==== Hydrolysis ====
It is possible for catalysis to occur with only one of the two substrates. If either acetyl-CoA or acetylcarnitine binds to CRAT, a water molecule may fill the other binding site and act as an acetyl group acceptor.

==== Substrate-assisted catalysis ====
The literature suggests that the trimethylammonium group on carnitine may be a crucial factor in CRAT catalysis. This group exhibits a positive charge that stabilizes the oxyanion in the reaction’s intermediate. This idea is supported by the fact the positive charge of carnitine is unnecessary for active site binding, but vital for the catalysis to proceed. This has been proven to be the case through the synthesis of a carnitine analog lacking its trimethylammonium group. This compound was able to compete with carnitine in binding to CRAT, but was unable to induce a reaction. The emergence of substrate-assisted catalysis has opened up new strategies for increasing synthetic substrate specificity.

=== Biological function ===
There is evidence that suggests that CRAT activity is necessary for the cell cycle to proceed from the G1 phase to the S phase.

== Clinical significance ==
Those with an inherited deficiency in CRAT activity are at risk for developing severe heart and neurological problems.

Reduced CRAT activity can be found in individuals suffering from Alzheimer’s disease.

CRAT and its family of enzymes have great potential as targets for developing therapeutic treatments for Type 2 diabetes and other diseases.

== Interactions ==
CRAT is known to interact with NEDD8, PEX5, SUMO1.
