= Palmitoyl-CoA =

Names
- IUPAC name 3′-O-Phosphonoadenosine 5′-{(3R)-4-[(3-{[2-(hexadecanoylsulfanyl)ethyl]amino}-3-oxopropyl)amino]-3-hydroxy-2,2-dimethyl-4-oxobutyl dihydrogen diphosphate}
- Systematic IUPAC name O^{1}-{[(2R,3S,4R,5R)-5-(6-Amino-9H-purin-9-yl)-4-hydroxy-3-(phosphonooxy)oxolan-2-yl]methyl} O^{3}-{(3R)-4-[(3-{[2-(hexadecanoylsulfanyl)ethyl]amino}-3-oxopropyl)amino]-3-hydroxy-2,2-dimethyl-4-oxobutyl} dihydrogen diphosphate

Identifiers
CAS Number	1763-10-6
3D model (JSmol)	Interactive image
ChemSpider	559149
ECHA InfoCard	100.015.616
KEGG	C00154
MeSH	Palmitoyl+Coenzyme+A
PubChem CID	644109
CompTox Dashboard (EPA)	DTXSID701027137
- InChI: InChI=1S/C37H66N7O17P3S/c1-4-5-6-7-8-9-10-11-12-13-14-15-16-17-28(46)65-21-20-39-27(45)18-19-40-35(49)32(48)37(2,3)23-58-64(55,56)61-63(53,54)57-22-26-31(60-62(50,51)52)30(47)36(59-26)44-25-43-29-33(38)41-24-42-34(29)44/h24-26,30-32,36,47-48H,4-23H2,1-3H3,(H,39,45)(H,40,49)(H,53,54)(H,55,56)(H2,38,41,42)(H2,50,51,52)/t26-,30-,31-,32+,36-/m1/s1 Key: MNBKLUUYKPBKDU-BBECNAHFSA-N; InChI=1/C37H66N7O17P3S/c1-4-5-6-7-8-9-10-11-12-13-14-15-16-17-28(46)65-21-20-39-27(45)18-19-40-35(49)32(48)37(2,3)23-58-64(55,56)61-63(53,54)57-22-26-31(60-62(50,51)52)30(47)36(59-26)44-25-43-29-33(38)41-24-42-34(29)44/h24-26,30-32,36,47-48H,4-23H2,1-3H3,(H,39,45)(H,40,49)(H,53,54)(H,55,56)(H2,38,41,42)(H2,50,51,52)/t26-,30-,31-,32+,36-/m1/s1 Key: MNBKLUUYKPBKDU-BBECNAHFBL
- SMILES: CCCCCCCCCCCCCCCC(=O)SCCNC(=O)CCNC(=O)[C@@H](C(C)(C)COP(=O)(O)OP(=O)(O)OC[C@@H]1[C@H]([C@H]([C@@H](O1)n2cnc3c2ncnc3N)O)OP(=O)(O)O)O

Properties
Chemical formula	C_{37}H_{66}N_{7}O_{17}P_{3}S
Molar mass	1005.95 g·mol^{−1}
- Except where otherwise noted, data are given for materials in their standard state (at 25 °C [77 °F], 100 kPa). verify (what is ?) Infobox references

Palmitoyl-CoA is an acyl-CoA thioester. It is an "activated" form of palmitic acid and can be transported into the mitochondrial matrix by the carnitine shuttle system (which transports fatty acyl-CoA molecules into mitochondria), and once inside, can participate in beta-oxidation. Alternatively, palmitoyl-CoA is used as a substrate in the biosynthesis of sphingosine (this biosynthetic pathway does not require transfer into mitochondria).

== Biosynthesis ==
Palmitoyl CoA formed from palmitic acid, in the reaction below.

Palmitate + CoA-SH + ATP → Palmitoyl-CoA + AMP + Pyrophosphate

This reaction is often referred to as the "activation" of a fatty acid. The activation is catalyzed by palmitoyl-coenzyme A synthetase and the reaction proceeds through a two step mechanism, in which palmitoyl-AMP is an intermediate. The reaction is driven to completion by the exergonic hydrolysis of pyrophosphate.

The activation of fatty acids occurs in the cytosol and beta-oxidation occurs in the mitochondria. However, long chain fatty acyl-CoA cannot cross the mitochondrial membrane. If palmitoyl-CoA is to enter the mitochondria, it must react with carnitine in order to be transported across:

Palmitoyl-CoA + Carnitine ⇌ Palmitoyl-Carnitine + CoA-SH

This transesterification reaction is catalyzed by carnitine palmitoyl transferase. Palmitoyl-Carnitine may translocate across the membrane, and once on matrix side, the reaction proceeds in reverse as CoA-SH is recombined with palmitoyl-CoA, and released. Unattached carnitine is then shuttled back to the cytosolic side of mitochondrial membrane.

== Beta-oxidation ==
Once inside the mitochondrial matrix, palmitoyl-CoA may undergo β-oxidation. The full oxidation of palmitic acid (or palmitoyl-CoA) results in 8 acetyl-CoA's, 7 NADH, 7 H^{+}, and 7 FADH_{2}. The full reaction is below:

Palmitoyl-CoA + 7 CoA-SH + 7 NAD^{+} + 7 FAD → 8 Acetyl-CoA + 7 NADH + 7 H^{+} + 7 FADH_{2}

== Sphingolipid biosynthesis ==
Palmitoyl-CoA is also the starting substrate, along with serine, for sphingolipid biosynthesis. Palmitoyl CoA and serine participate in a condensation reaction catalyzed by serine C-palmitoyltransferase (SPT), in which 3-ketosphinganine is formed. These reactions occur in the cytosol.

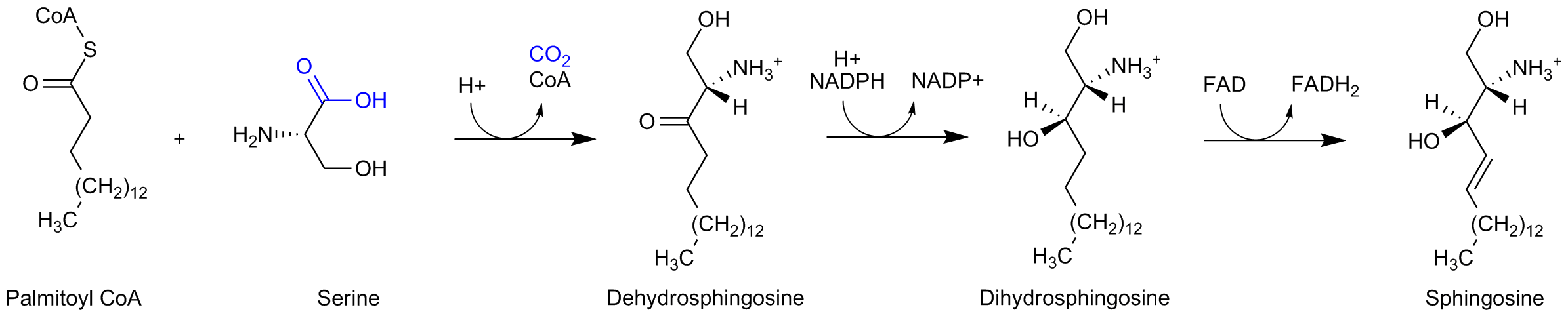
Sphingosine synthesis

== Additional images ==
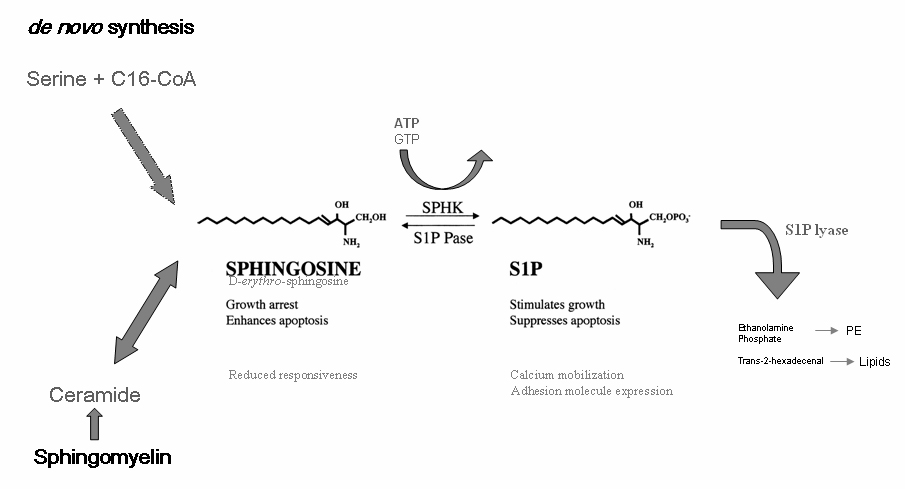
Synthesis

Palmitic acid

Coenzyme A

== See also ==
- Coenzyme A (CoA)
- Fatty acid synthesis
