= Adebowale A. Adeyemo =

Nigerian physician and genetic epidemiologist

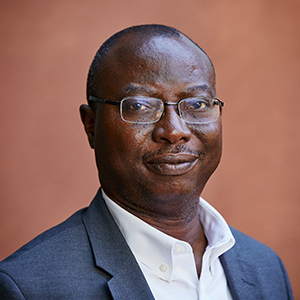
- Adeyemo in 2019
- Education: University of Ibadan
- Scientific career
- Fields: Genetic epidemiology
- Workplaces: Howard University; National Human Genome Research Institute

Adebowale A. Adeyemo is a Nigerian physician-scientist and genetic epidemiologist specialized in genomics and cardiometabolic disorders. He is the deputy director and chief scientific officer of the Center for Research on Genomics and Global Health at the National Human Genome Research Institute.

== Education ==
Adeyemo completed a Bachelor of Medicine, Bachelor of Surgery at the University of Ibadan in 1987. He graduated with a distinction in anatomy and the departmental prize in surgery.

Adeyemo completed a residency in pediatrics and genetics at the University College Hospital, Ibadan from 1989 to 1994. He conducted a postdoctoral education in bioinformatics at the University of Manchester Institute of Science and Technology. Adeyemo conducted a fellowship in genetic epidemiology in the department of preventive medicine and epidemiology at Loyola University Chicago from 1999 to August 2000.

== Career ==
In 2003, Adeyemo joined the faculty at Howard University to work in genetic epidemiology at the National Human Genome Center. He joined the National Human Genome Research Institute (NHGRI) in 2008 as a staff scientist. He became an associate investigator at NHGRI in 2016. He is the deputy director and chief scientific officer of the NHGRI Center for Research on Genomics and Global Health.

Adeyemo works on the genomics of complex disease, focusing on cardiometabolic disorders and complex disorders of childhood. He has published in genetics and genetic epidemiology. He was the first author of the papers describing the first genome scan for obesity in an African population, the first genome-wide linkage analysis for serum lipids in an African population, the first study of genetic structure in West Africans using genome-wide markers and the first genome-wide association study (GWAS) for hypertension and blood pressure in African Americans.

His research also includes genetics of orofacial clefts. In collaborative studies, his research led to findings of novel IRF6 mutations in families with Van Der Woude syndrome and popliteal pterygium syndrome in Africa and helped identify rare functional variants in non-syndromic cleft lip/palate. His research has grown to include genetics of congenital heart defects (CHD). This collaborative study is currently enrolling children with CHD and their parents in Nigeria for genomic studies, including chromosomal arrays and whole exome sequencing. The project facilitates the collection of a clinical epidemiology dataset of congenital heart defects in an African population.

Adeyemo is co-chair of the H3Africa Genome Analysis Working Group and serves on the H3ABioNet Scientific Advisory Board. He is a co-creator of the NHGRI electronic atlas of birth defects for diverse populations.
