= C22orf23 =

Protein-coding gene in the species Homo sapiens

Identifiers
- Aliases: C22orf23, EVG1, dJ1039K5.6, chromosome 22 open reading frame 23
- External IDs: MGI: 1920774; HomoloGene: 13062; GeneCards: C22orf23; OMA:C22orf23 - orthologs

Gene location (Human)
Chr.	Chromosome 22 (human)
Band	22q13.1	Start	37,943,050 bp
Band	22q13.1	End	37,953,669 bp

Gene location (Mouse)
Chr.	Chromosome 15 (mouse)
Band	15 E1|15 37.7 cM	Start	79,013,549 bp
Band	15 E1|15 37.7 cM	End	79,025,453 bp
RNA expression pattern
Bgee	Human / Mouse (ortholog); Top expressed in: left testis; sperm; right testis; testicle; right uterine tube; smooth muscle tissue; muscle layer of sigmoid colon; body of stomach; C1 segment; gonad / Top expressed in: seminiferous tubule; olfactory epithelium; spermatocyte; spermatid; neural layer of retina; right kidney; utricle; proximal tubule; ascending aorta; Epithelium of choroid plexus; More reference expression data
BioGPS	n/a
Gene ontology
Molecular function	protein binding; molecular function
Cellular component	cellular component
Biological process	biological process
Sources:Amigo / QuickGO
Orthologs
Species	Human	Mouse
Entrez	84645	27660
Ensembl	ENSG00000128346	ENSMUSG00000033029
UniProt	Q9BZE7	Q9D9S1
RefSeq (mRNA)	NM_001207062; NM_032561	NM_138581; NM_001310576; NM_001310579; NM_001310581
RefSeq (protein)	NP_001193991; NP_115950	NP_001297505; NP_001297508; NP_001297510; NP_613047
Location (UCSC)	Chr 22: 37.94 – 37.95 Mb	Chr 15: 79.01 – 79.03 Mb
PubMed search
- Wikidata
View/Edit Human	View/Edit Mouse

C22orf23 (Chromosome 22 Open Reading Frame 23) is a protein which in humans is encoded by the C22orf23 gene. Its predicted secondary structure consists of alpha helices and disordered/coil regions. It is expressed in many tissues and highest in the testes and it is conserved across many orthologs.

== Gene ==
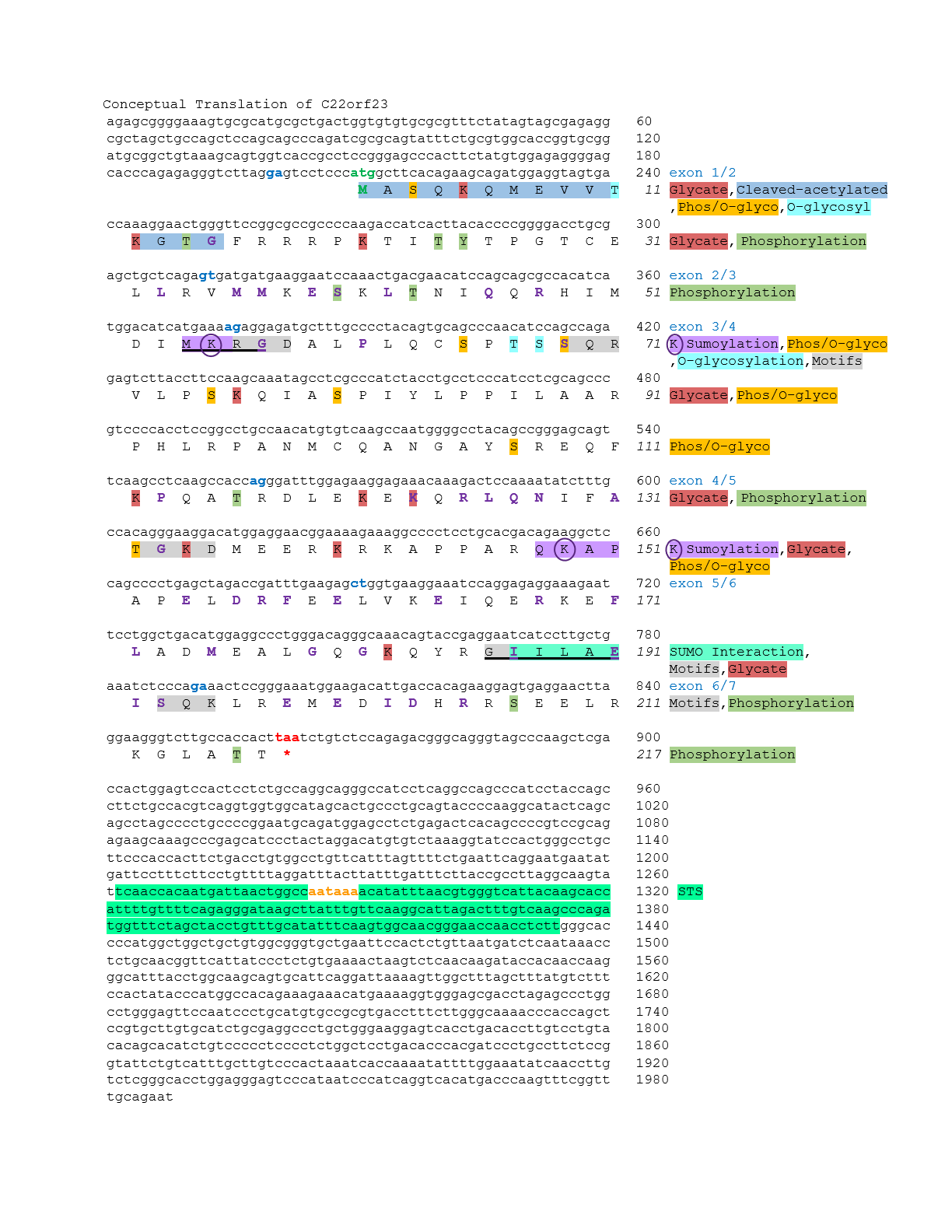
This conceptual translation of c22orf23 includes post-translational modifications indicated on the right, start codon in green, stop codon in red, exon-exon junctions in blue, polyadenylation tail in orange, and highly conserved amino acids in purple.

=== Size and locus ===
C22orf23 is a gene found in homo sapiens. It is located on Chromosome 22 on the minus strand, map position 22q13.1. It spans 10,620 base pairs. Its mRNA transcript is 1988 base pars long and has 7 exons. Its predicted function is protein binding, and molecular function.

=== Common aliases ===
C22orf23's aliases are: UPF0193 Protein EVG1, DJ1039K5.6, EVG1 FLJ32787, and LOC84645.

== Protein ==
=== Primary sequence ===
The protein encoded by the mRNA sequence is 217 amino acids in length and has a predicted molecular mass of 25 kDa. The predicted isoelectric point is 9.8. It is located in the nucleus.

=== Domains and motifs ===
It is predicted to be an intracellular protein and does not have any predicted transmembrane domains. Due to its location and lack of predicted transmembrane domains, the protein structure is likely a globular protein.

=== Post-Translational Modifications ===
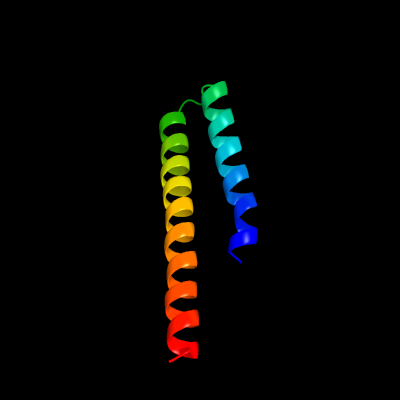
Predicted secondary structure of C22orf23. 53% of the sequence is predicted as disordered and cannot be predicted with confidence. It has a coverage modeled of 28% with a 42.9% confidence. The image was created using Phyre2.

C22orf23 has many predicted post-translational modifications such as: phosphorylation sites, cell attachment sequences, N-myristoylation sites, O-linked glycosylation sites, glycation sites, Ac-ASQK cleaved-acetylated sites, and Sumoylation sites. Many of the predicted phosphorylation sites were also predicted to be O-linked glycosylation sites thus the phosphorylation site could be blocked altering that domain's structure or function.

=== Secondary Structure ===
The predicted secondary structure consists of alpha helices and disordered/coil regions. The predicted secondary structure model has a 28% coverage of the amino acid sequence with a 42.9% confidence.

== Homology ==
=== Paralogs ===
There are currently no known paralogs to C22orf23.

=== Orthologs ===
Orthologs can be found in most major groups of species ranging from most similar in primates to most distant in a member of phylum Chytridiomycota. This includes: mammals, reptiles, birds, amphibian, bony fish, cartilaginous fish, invertebrates, and fungi. Orthologs may have first appeared in plants or fungi however it is uncertain.

This table lists several orthologs for C22orf23 and includes their species name, common name, taxonomic order, accession number, sequence length, sequence similarity, and evolutionary date of divergence.

Orthologs of C22orf23
Genus and species	Common name	Taxonomic group (Order)	Date of Divergence (MYA)	Accession #	Sequence length (aa)	Sequence identity (%)
Homo sapiens	Human	Primate	0	AAH31998.1	217	100
Piliocolobus tephrosceles	Ugandan Red Colobus	Primate	29	XP_023077818	217	95
Propithecus coquereli	Coquerel's Sifaka	Primate	74	XP_012493592	217	84
Marmota marmota marmota	Alpine Marmot	Rodent	90	XP_015338208	217	73
Mus caroli	Ryukyu Mouse	Rodent	90	XP_021038824	216	81
Physeter catodon	Sperm Whale	Even-toed ungulates	96	XP_007111804	217	85
Odocoileus virginianus texanus	White Tailed Deer	Artiodactyla	96	XP_020752151	217	86
Panthera pardus	Leopard	Carnivores	96	XP_019302406	217	85
Rousettus aegyptiacus	Egyptian Fruit Bat	Bat	96	XP_016017249	217	83
Condylura cristata	Star-nosed Mole	Eulipotyphla	96	XP_004676507	217	80
Vombatus ursinus	Common Wombat	Diprotodontia	159	XP_027727589	263	61
Nothoprocta perdicaria	Chilean Tinamou	Tinamiformes	312	XP_025895660	234	61
Serinus canaria	Atlantic Canary	Passeriformes	312	XP_009084739	223	57
Notechis scutatus	Tiger snake	Squamata	312	XP_026550684	234	56
Nanorana parkeri	High Himalaya Frog	Frog	352	XP_018428081	225	51
Salvelinus alpinus	Arctic char	Salmoniformes	435	XP_023998646	217	49
Rhincodon typus	Whale Shark	Carpet shark	473	XP_020370272	232	48
Callorhinchus milii	Australian ghostshark	Chimaera	473	NP_001279734	232	46
Apostichopus japonicus	Sea Cucumber	Synallactida	684	PIK47438	221	48
Crassostrea virginica	Eastern Oyster	Ostreoida	797	XP_022313321.1	224	43
Capitella teleta	Segmented Annelid Worm	Capitellidae	797	ELU02060	221	39
Megachile rotundata	Leafcutter Bee	Hymenopterans	797	XP_003702438	230	36
Stylophora pistillata	Hood Coral	Stony corals	824	XP_022780055	219	42
Pocillopora damicornis	Cauliflower Coral	Scleractinia	824	XP_027046963	220	42
Macrostomum lignano	Flatworm	Macrostomida	824	PAA47644	270	38
Trichoplax	Trichoplax	Tricoplaciformes	948	RDD45244	239	39
Spizellomyces punctatus	Fungi	Spizellomyces punctatus	1105	XP_016608264	260	30

== Expression ==
=== Promoter ===
The core promoter is GXP_7541220 (-), and its coordinates are 37953445-37954669 and it is 1225 base pairs long.

=== Tissue expression ===
==== Human expression ====
Protein expression is highest in the testes however it is also expressed at low levels in many other tissues such as: brain, kidney, stomach, skin, thyroid, urinary bladder, placenta, endometrium, esophagus, and appendix, bone marrow, adipose, lung, and ovary.

==== Ortholog expression ====
Expression in orthologs Rattus norvegicus, is expressed primarily in the testes with low levels of expression in the: kidneys, lungs, heart, and uterus. Mus musculus is expressed primarily in the adrenal and testes, and also notably expressed in the: bladder, abdomen, heart, lungs, ovaries, and mammary gland.

== Interactions ==
=== Protein Interactions ===
There are several predicted protein interactions: Cyclin-D1-binding protein 1 which may regulate cell cycle progression, Vacuolar protein sorting-associated protein 28 homolog which is involved as a regulator of vesicular trafficking, UPF0739 protein C1orf74, and estrogen related receptor gamma. These interacting proteins were identified as either having direct interactions or physical associations. They were identified through a variety of detection methods including affinity chromatography, 2 hybrid prey pooling, and 2 hybrid array. It also has predicted protein interactions with SH3 domain containing 19, EvC ciliary complex subunit 1, RIMS binding protein 3B, RIMS binding protein 3C,TSSK6-activating co-chaperone protein, V-set and immunoglobulin domain containing 8, family with sequence similarity 124 member B, small nucleolar RNA host gene 28, and transmembrane protein 200B. Evidence suggesting a functional link for these interactions were supported through Co-mention on PubMed.

== Clinical Significance ==
=== Disease Association ===
C22orf23 was identified as belonging to one of two groups of pooled serum samples in a study that analyzed the difference between serum glycoproteins of hepatocellular carcinoma and that of normal serum. Deletions of parts of C22orf23 (exons 3 and 4) and several other genes including SOX10 has been observed in patients with peripheral demyelinating neuropathy, central demyelinating leukodystrophy, Waardenburg Syndrome, and Hirschsprung disease and is therefore, suggested to be a potential factor involved in these ailments. C22orf23 was also mentioned in a study of mutation profiles from ER+ breast cancer samples taken from postmenopausal patience. There were mutations found that affected C22orf23 among many other genes. In a study of epigenetic alterations involved in coronary artery disease, C22orf23 was found to have altered epigenetic modifications which could be involved in novel genes in Coronary artery disease. In a study that attempts to predict imprinted genes that maybe linked to Human disorders, C22orf23 was identified as homologous of imprinted Gene candidates showing linkage to schizophrenia. In another study it was listed as being a potently regulated protein in uterine leiomyoma.

=== Mutations ===
There are a total of 3340 SNPs within the 5’ and 3’ UTR, introns, exons, as well as some genes near the 5’ and 3’ UTR. There is a total of 225 SNPs within the coding sequence. Some of the SNPs occur in conserved amino acids within the coding sequence and some reported have one or more types of validation. Some of the SNPs have high heterozygosity scores and thus have a presence in the population.
