= Go 6976 =

Names
- Preferred IUPAC name 3-(13-Methyl-5-oxo-5,6,7,13-tetrahydro-12H-indolo[2,3-a]pyrrolo[3,4-c]carbazol-12-yl)propanenitrile
- Other names PD 406976

Identifiers
CAS Number	136194-77-9
3D model (JSmol)	Interactive image
Beilstein Reference	8588138
ChEBI	CHEBI:51913
ChEMBL	ChEMBL302449
ChemSpider	3381
PubChem CID	3501
UNII	B9IQO7JZ16
CompTox Dashboard (EPA)	DTXSID70159731
- InChI: InChI=1S/C24H18N4O/c1-27-17-9-4-2-7-14(17)20-21-16(13-26-24(21)29)19-15-8-3-5-10-18(15)28(12-6-11-25)23(19)22(20)27/h2-5,7-10H,6,12-13H2,1H3,(H,26,29) Key: VWVYILCFSYNJHF-UHFFFAOYSA-N
- SMILES: O=C1NCC2=C3C(N(CCC#N)C4=CC=CC=C43)=C5C(C6=CC=CC=C6N5C)=C21

Properties
Chemical formula	C_{24}H_{18}N_{4}O
Molar mass	378.435 g·mol^{−1}
- Except where otherwise noted, data are given for materials in their standard state (at 25 °C [77 °F], 100 kPa). Infobox references

Go 6976 (also known as Go-6976 and Goe 6976) is an organic protein kinase inhibitor. It has some specificity for protein kinase C alpha and beta, and through their inhibition it is thought to induce the formation of cell junctions, and hence inhibit the invasion of urinary bladder carcinoma cells".
