= Popliteal pterygium syndrome =

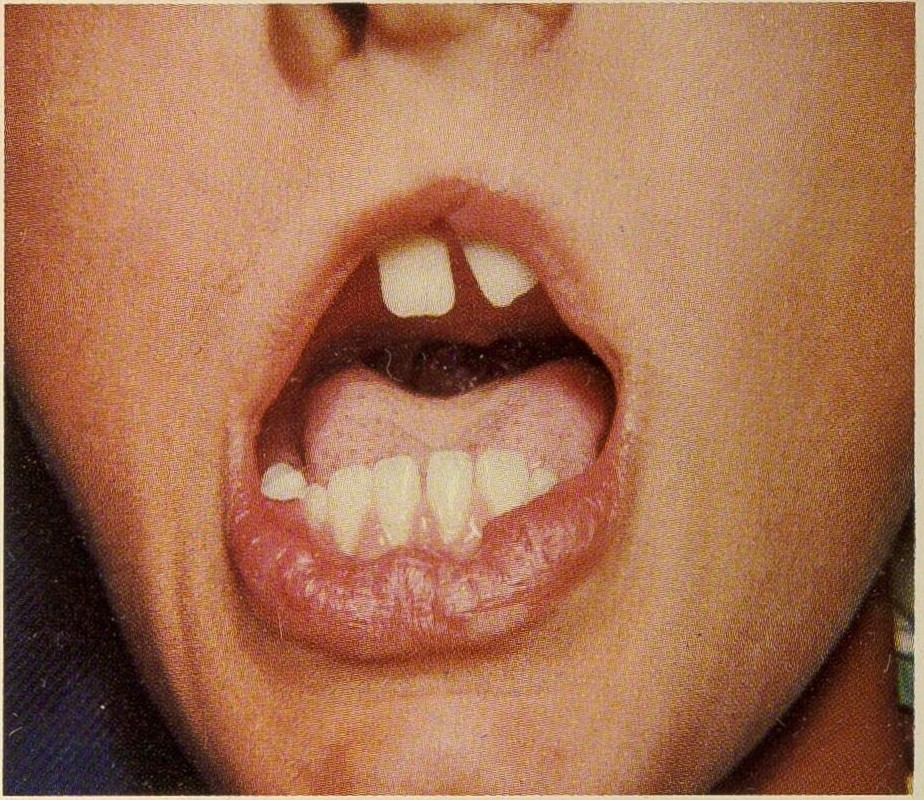
- Image depicts pits in the lower lip, a signature facial symptom of PPS
- Specialty: Medical genetics
- Causes: Mutation to IRF6 gene
- Diagnostic method: Genetic testing and prenatal ultrasound screening
- Treatment: Surgery
- Frequency: 1 in 300,000 births

Popliteal pterygium syndrome (PPS) is a rare inherited genetic disorder characterized by distinctive craniofacial, musculoskeletal and genitourinary symptoms. It is primarily caused by a mutation to the IRF6 gene and follows an autosomal dominant inheritance pattern. The syndrome is associated with many features such as popliteal webbing (pterygium), cleft lip or palate, syndactyly, and genetic anomalies with the severity and expression of each symptom varying between affected individuals. PPS has an approximate incidence rate of 1 in every 300 000 live births. The condition was first described by Trélat in 1869 and later named by Gorlin and colleagues in 1968. The term pterygium is derived from the Greek word for "wing," referring to the wing-like tissue structures often observed in affected individuals.

== Symptoms and signs ==
Clinical expressions of PPS are highly variable and display different combinations of abnormalities depending on the individual, but include the following:

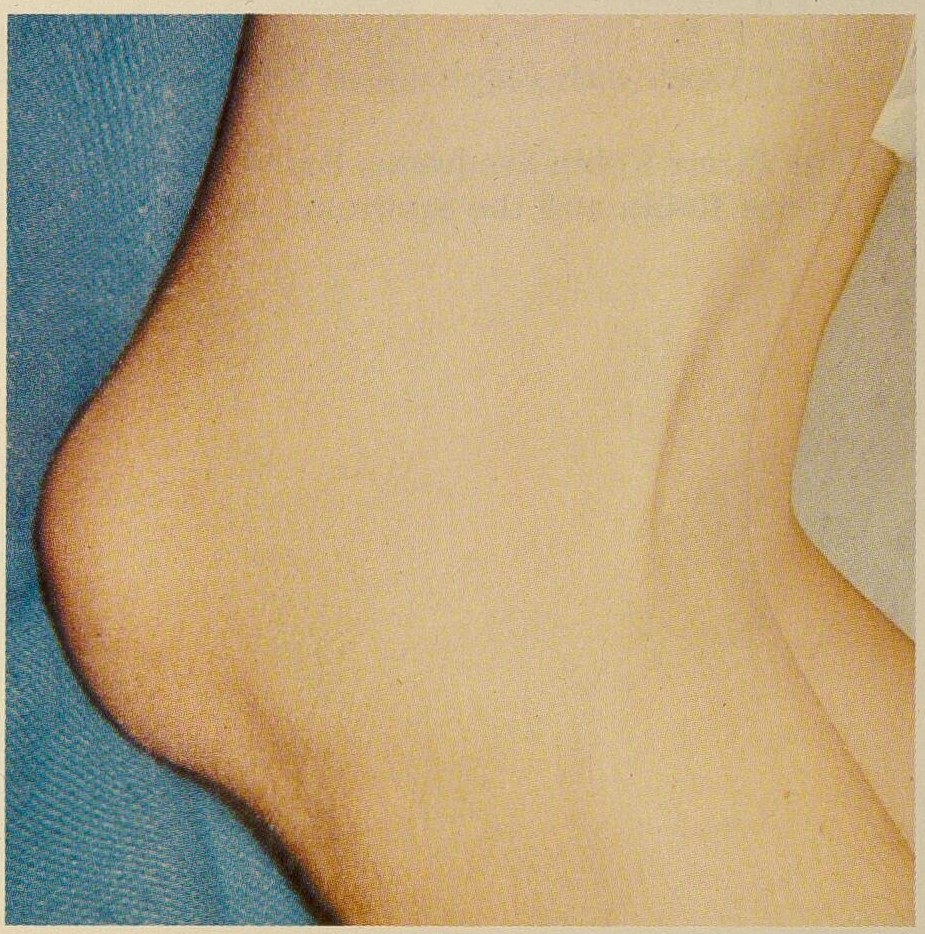
Image depicting popliteal webbing (webbing of the knee)

- Limb findings: popliteal webbing which is webbing of fusion of the skin behind the knee which restricts leg extension, malformed toenails, fusion of finger or toes known as syndactyly, talipes (foot is twisted out of normal position), and missing or underdeveloped fingers or toes.
- Facial findings: cleft palate with or without cleft lip, pits in the lower lip, fibrous bands in the mouth known as syngnathia, and a partial or complete fusion of eyelids at birth (ankyloblepharon).
- Genital findings: hypoplasia of the labia majora, malformation of the scrotum, and cryptorchidism.

== Genetics ==
Image depicts autosomal dominant inheritance patterns

Popliteal pterygium syndrome is caused by mutations in the IRF6 gene, which follow an autosomal dominant mode of inheritance. The IRF6 gene encodes a transcription factor. Mutations of this gene associated with PPS occur in the DNA-binding domain, which prevents the IRF6 protein from interacting with its target DNA sequence; this affects the expression of target genes that result in the observed PPS symptoms.

The term PPS has also been used for two rare autosomal recessively inherited conditions: Lethal PPS and PPS with Ectodermal Dysplasia. Although both conditions feature a cleft lip/palate, syngnathia, and popliteal pterygium, they are clinically distinguishable from the autosomal dominant case. Lethal PPS is differentiated by microcephaly, corneal aplasia, ectropion, bony fusions, hypoplastic nose and absent thumbs, while PPS with Ectodermal Dysplasia is differentiated by woolly hair, brittle nails, ectodermal anomalies, and fissure of the sacral vertebrae.

=== Relationship to Van der Woude syndrome ===
Van der Woude syndrome (VDWS) and popliteal pterygium syndrome (PPS) are allelic variants of the same condition; that is, they are caused by different mutations in the IRF6 gene. Mutations associated with VDWS are different from PPS, in that they occur in regions of the IRF6 protein not directly involved in DNA-binding; observed mutations have caused protein truncation, inability to form protein complexes, or inability to bind DNA. PPS includes all the features of VDWS, plus popliteal pterygium, syngnathia, distinct toe/nail abnormality, syndactyly, and genito-urinary malformations.

=== Relationship to Bartsocas-Papas syndrome ===
Bartsocas-Papas syndrome is a form of popliteal pterygium syndrome caused by an autosomal recessive mutation in the RIPK4 gene. It is a rare disease characterized by congenital craniofacial anomalies, popliteal webbing, and genitourinary and musculoskeletal anomalies.

== Diagnosis ==
Popliteal Pterygium Syndrome (PPS) can be diagnosed prenatally through ultrasound and confirmed via genetic testing. Ultrasound imaging can identify characteristic physical anomalies associated with PPS, including popliteal webbing, lower limb abnormalities (such as bilateral equinovarus feet, syndactyly, and ectrodactyly), facial abnormalities (such as cleft lip), and ambiguous genitalia. While these markers are not exclusive to PPS, the presence of multiple anomalies suggests the possibility of the condition.

Definitive diagnosis can be achieved through genetic testing, which detects mutations in the IRF6 gene, known to be associated with PPS. Fetal DNA, obtained from cord blood, amniocentesis, or chorionic villus sampling, can undergo whole-exome sequencing to confirm the presence of an IRF6 gene mutation. In cases where a de novo mutation is detected, the risk of recurrence in future pregnancies is significantly lower than in familial cases.

== Treatment ==
Popliteal Pterygium Syndrome (PPS) does not typically affect cognitive development, and individuals with the condition generally exhibit normal mental development. Treatment is primarily surgical and focuses on correcting limb, facial, and genital abnormalities associated with the syndrome. Depending on the severity of the anomalies, multiple reconstructive surgeries may be required to improve mobility, appearance, and function. While the prognosis is generally favorable, the extent of physical disabilities and the need for surgical intervention vary among affected individuals.

== Epidemiology ==
Popliteal pterygium syndrome (PPS) is a rare genetic disorder with an estimated incidence of approximately 1 in 300,000 births. It is inherited in an autosomal dominant pattern, as evidenced by a case in which a healthy mother and father had four out of nine pregnancies definitively affected by PPS. The syndrome has been reported in diverse populations and is not associated with any specific haplogroups or ethnic groups.

== See also ==
- List of cutaneous conditions
- Multiple pterygium syndrome
- Van der Woude syndrome
- Bartsocas-Papas syndrome
