= Congenital lip pit =

- Specialty: Oral & Maxillofacial Surgery
- Usual onset: At birth
- Treatment: Fistulectomy
- Prognosis: Excellent

A congenital lip pit or lip sinus is a congenital disorder characterized by the presence of pits and possibly associated fistulas in the lips. They are often hereditary, and may occur alone or in association with cleft lip and palate, termed Van der Woude syndrome.

== Diagnosis ==
=== Classification ===
They are divided into three types based on their location:

- commissural pits, which are small pits near the labial commissure of the mouth,
- a pit in the upper lip, in which case it may be called a midline sinus of the upper lip, and
- pits in the lower lip, in which case it may be called a congenital sinus of the lower lip.

In some cases commissural pits have been reported in combination with preauricaluar pits, which are near the ear.

== Treatment ==
Lip pits do not usually require any treatment, although in some reported cases surgical excision has been used or if associated with a draining sinus tract.

== See also ==
- Skin dimple
