= Bartsocas–Papas syndrome =

Medical condition

- Other names: Autosomal recessive popliteal pterygium syndrome, Lethal popliteal pterygium syndrome
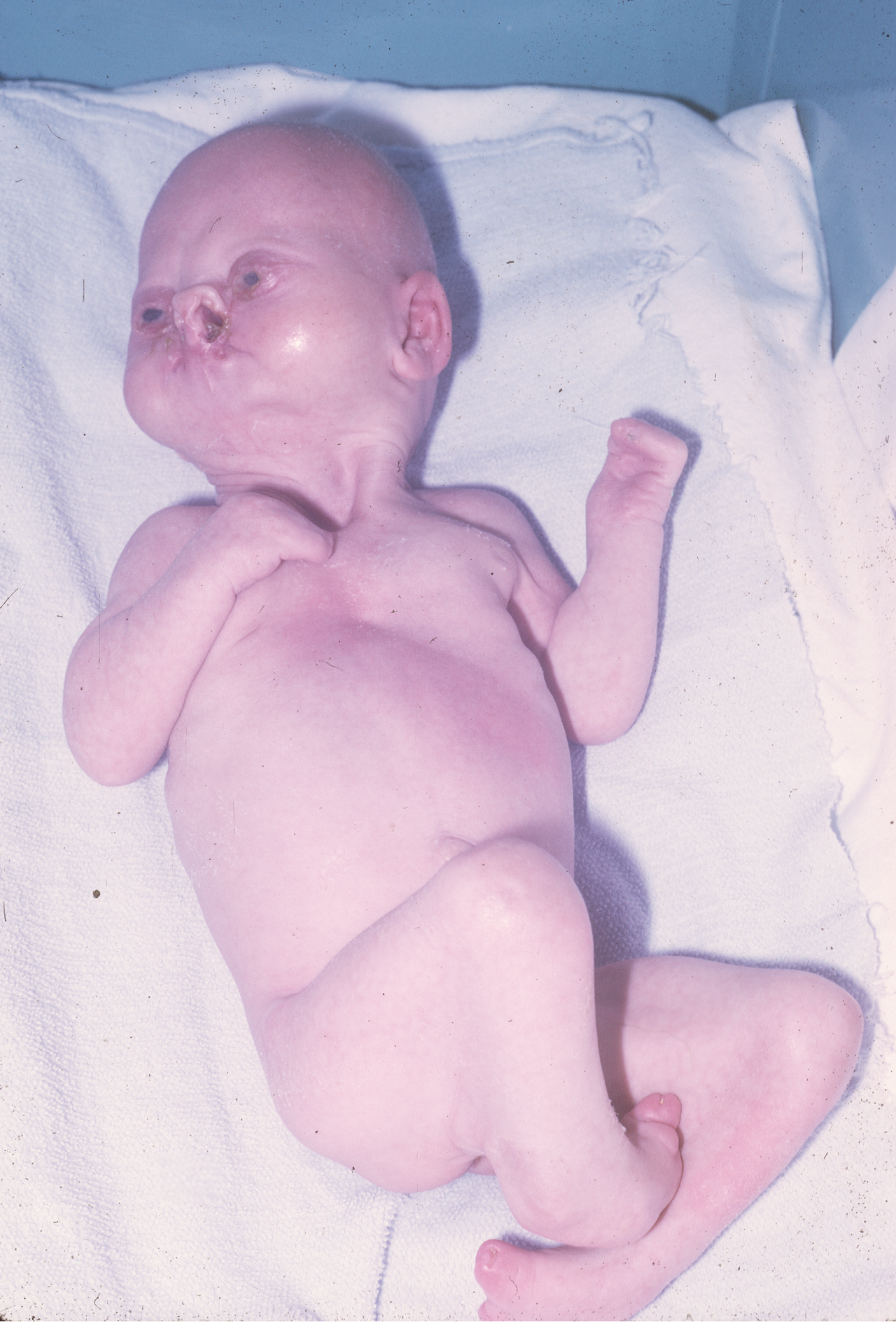
- The first reported case of Bartsocas–Papas syndrome
- Specialty: Medical genetics

Bartsocas–Papas syndrome is an autosomal recessive form of popliteal pterygium syndrome. It was first described by Christos S. Bartsocas and Costas V. Papas.

== Disease definition ==
According to the Genetic and Rare Diseases Research Center:

Bartsocas–Papas syndrome is a rare, inherited, popliteal pterygium syndrome characterized by severe popliteal webbing, microcephaly, atypical face with short palpebral fissures, ankyloblepharon, hypoplasticnose, filiform bands between the jaws and facial clefts, oligosyndactyly, genital anomalies, and additional ectodermal anomalies (i.e. absent hair, eyebrows, lashes and nails).

== Locus ==
Μutations in RIPK4 cause the autosomal recessive form of the Bartsocas–Papas syndrome.

== See also ==
- Popliteal pterygium syndrome
- Autosomal recessive
- RIPK4

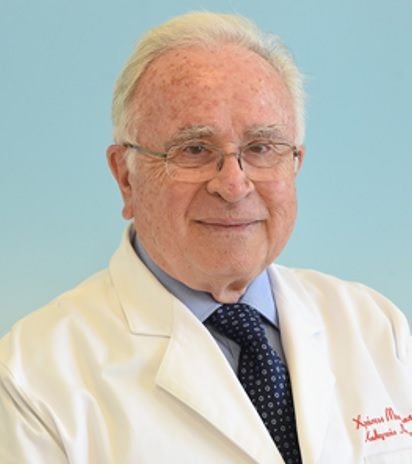
Dr. Christos S. Bartsocas, who first described the syndrome

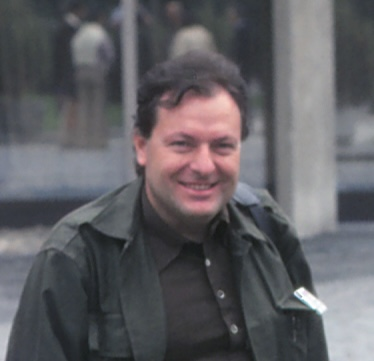
Dr. Costas V. Papas
