= C1orf74 =

Protein-coding gene in humans

Identifiers
- Aliases: C1orf74, URLC4, chromosome 1 open reading frame 74
- External IDs: MGI: 2441776; HomoloGene: 17592; GeneCards: C1orf74; OMA:C1orf74 - orthologs

Gene location (Human)
Chr.	Chromosome 1 (human)
Band	1q32.2	Start	209,779,208 bp
Band	1q32.2	End	209,784,559 bp

Gene location (Mouse)
Chr.	Chromosome 1 (mouse)
Band	1|1 H6	Start	192,850,354 bp
Band	1|1 H6	End	192,860,140 bp
RNA expression pattern
Bgee	Human / Mouse (ortholog); Top expressed in: granulocyte; endothelial cell; gingival epithelium; testicle; secondary oocyte; skin of abdomen; skin of thigh; islet of Langerhans; olfactory zone of nasal mucosa; mucosa of ileum / Top expressed in: spermatid; seminal vesicula; fossa; transitional epithelium of urinary bladder; condyle; interventricular septum; lobe of prostate; renal corpuscle; hand; superior cervical ganglion; More reference expression data
BioGPS	n/a
Orthologs
Species	Human	Mouse
Entrez	148304	319266
Ensembl	ENSG00000162757	ENSMUSG00000079144
UniProt	Q96LT6	Q9DAE8
RefSeq (mRNA)	NM_152485	NM_001160359; NM_001160360; NM_181048
RefSeq (protein)	NP_689698	NP_001153831; NP_001153832; NP_851391
Location (UCSC)	Chr 1: 209.78 – 209.78 Mb	Chr 1: 192.85 – 192.86 Mb
PubMed search
- Wikidata
View/Edit Human	View/Edit Mouse

UPF0739 protein C1orf74 is a protein that in humans is encoded by the C1orf74 gene.

== Gene ==
The gene C1orf74 is a protein-encoding gene on chromosome 1 in humans. It is also known as URLC4 in humans. The locus of this gene is 1q32.2. C1orf74 is 2229 base pairs long. The gene contains two exons.

C1orf74 is downstream of the gene interferon regulatory factor 6 or IRF6 in humans.

== Transcript ==
C1orf74 is transcribed into an mRNA that is 1642 nucleotides long in humans. The transcript contains two exons and one upstream in-frame stop codon. The 5' UTR of this transcript is 343 nucleotides long and the 3' UTR is 570 nucleotides long.

Both exons are usually transcribed. A few cases exist where only the second exon was transcribed. A fusion transcript containing IRF6 and the first exon of C1orf74 has also been found, but this transcript results in a short polypeptide.

== Protein ==
The protein that is encoded by C1orf74 in humans is most commonly known as UPF0739 protein C1orf74. The human version of UPF0739 contains 269 amino acids and weighs 29430 Da. Amino acids 19 to 269 are part of a domain of unknown function known as DUF4504. Within this DUF, there are two conserved sequence motifs LLGYP and SFS.

The translational start site of C1orf74 is after the exon-exon junction, which means the protein is made only by translating the second exon.

== Expression ==
C1orf74 is ubiquitously expressed in most tissues in humans during embryonic development and through adulthood. This gene is expressed throughout the nervous system, mammary and salivary glands, skin, and most internal organs.

== Function ==
One suggestion of C1orf74's function in humans comes from data that has been published only in NCBI from a paper that will come out later this year by Daigo and Nakamura. The authors found that C1orf74 is up-regulated in lung cancer and they have added the alias URLC4 to this protein (BAQ19750).

C1orf74's locus, 1q32.2, has been associated with schizophrenia. This means that C1orf74, or its neighbors, contribute to the risk of schizophrenia. A mutation in IRF6, C1orf74's upstream neighbor, results in cleft palate and Van der Woude syndrome. Mutations in regions upstream and downstream of IRF6, such as C1orf74, may also result in Van der Woude syndrome or these mutations may work with a mutation in IRF6 to result in the disease.

== Evolution ==
The human gene C1orf74 does not have any known paralogs, but it has many orthologs that contain the same DUF. It has orthologs in most vertebrates and some invertebrates, like worms, leeches and sea snails. Some of C1orf74's orthologs include mouse, hedgehog, chicken, zebrafish, alligator, and leech. C1orf74 has a distant ortholog in white rust (Albugo candida), which is a type of oomycete and not a true fungus. No orthologs were found in plants, fungi, or bacteria.
