= Adebowale =

Nigerian given name

- Gender: Male
- Language: Yoruba

Origin
- Origin: Nigeria
- Meaning: The crown or royalty returns back home.
- Region of origin: South West, Nigeria

Adébọ̀wálé is both a surname and a given name of Yoruba origin, meaning "the crown or royalty returns back home". Notable people with the name include:

== Given name ==
- Adebowale A. Adeyemo, Nigerian physician-scientist and genetic epidemiologist
- Adebowale Adefuye (1947–2015), Nigerian diplomat and historian
- Adebowale Ogungbure (born 1981), Nigerian footballer

== Surname ==
- Bayo Adebowale (born 1944), Nigerian poet, writer, critic and librarian
- Emmanuel Adebowale (born 1997), English footballer
- Michael Adebowale (born 1991), Islamist convicted of the murder of Lee Rigby
- Victor Adebowale, Baron Adebowale (born 1962), British politician
