= PDLIM5 =

Protein-coding gene in the species Homo sapiens

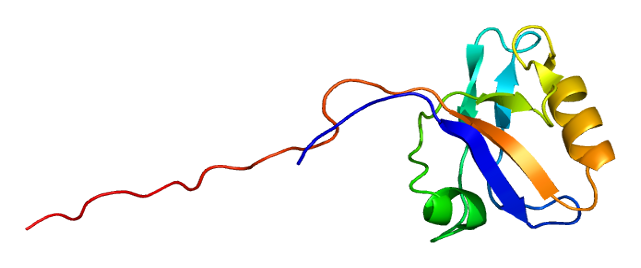

Identifiers
- Aliases: PDLIM5, ENH, ENH1, LIM, L9, PDZ and LIM domain 5
- External IDs: OMIM: 605904; MGI: 1927489; GeneCards: PDLIM5
Available structures
PDB	Ortholog search: PDBe RCSB
PDB	List of PDB id codes 2UZC, 2DAR

Gene location (Human)
Chr.	Chromosome 4 (human)
Band	4q22.3	Start	94,451,857 bp
Band	4q22.3	End	94,668,227 bp

Gene location (Mouse)
Chr.	Chromosome 3 (mouse)
Band	3|3 H1	Start	141,945,351 bp
Band	3|3 H1	End	142,101,457 bp
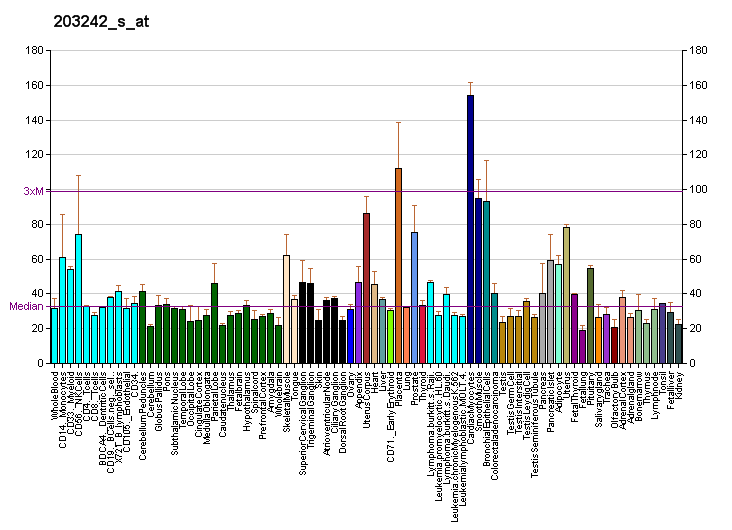

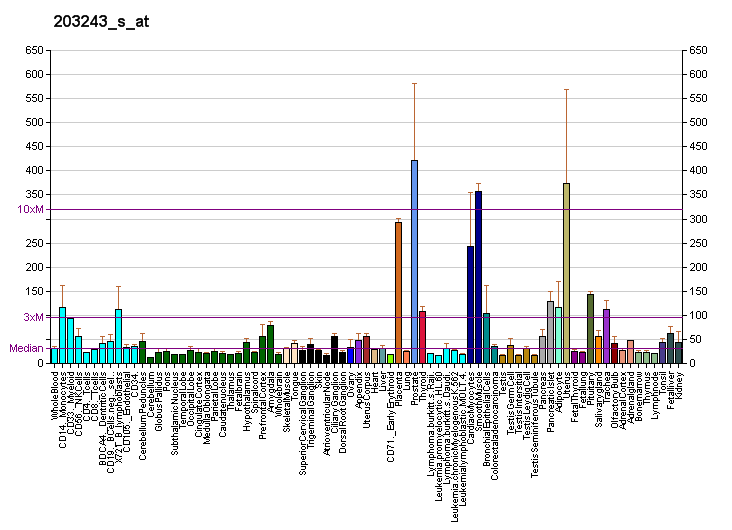

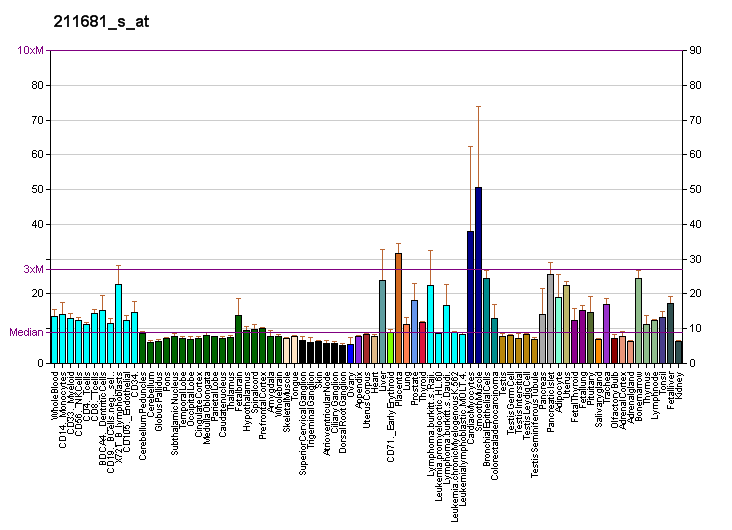
RNA expression pattern
Bgee	Human / Mouse (ortholog); Top expressed in: Skeletal muscle tissue of biceps brachii; Skeletal muscle tissue of rectus abdominis; right ventricle; triceps brachii muscle; glutes; thoracic diaphragm; Epithelium of choroid plexus; muscle of thigh; gastrocnemius muscle; body of tongue / Top expressed in: soleus muscle; myocardium of ventricle; atrioventricular valve; muscle of thigh; quadriceps femoris muscle; vastus lateralis muscle; interventricular septum; sternocleidomastoid muscle; tibialis anterior muscle; medial head of gastrocnemius muscle; More reference expression data
BioGPS	More reference expression data
Gene ontology
Molecular function	protein binding; metal ion binding; protein N-terminus binding; actin binding; actinin binding; protein kinase C binding; cadherin binding involved in cell-cell adhesion; muscle alpha-actinin binding
Cellular component	cytoplasm; cell junction; neuron projection; postsynaptic membrane; plasma membrane; synapse; actin cytoskeleton; membrane; postsynaptic density; cytosol; stress fiber; Z discdkac; filamentous actin
Biological process	regulation of dendritic spine morphogenesis; regulation of synapse assembly; cell-cell adhesion; cell growth involved in cardiac muscle cell development; development of the heart; actin cytoskeleton organization; muscle structure development
Sources:Amigo / QuickGO
Orthologs
Databases	NCBI: entry; OMA: entry
Species	Human	Mouse
Entrez	10611	56376
Ensembl	ENSG00000163110	ENSMUSG00000028273
UniProt	Q96HC4	Q8CI51
RefSeq (mRNA)	NM_001011513; NM_001011515; NM_001011516; NM_001256425; NM_001256426 NM_001256427; NM_001256428; NM_001256429; NM_006457	NM_001190852; NM_001190853; NM_001190854; NM_001190855; NM_001190856 NM_001190857; NM_019808; NM_019809; NM_022554
RefSeq (protein)	NP_001011513; NP_001011515; NP_001011516; NP_001243354; NP_001243355 NP_001243356; NP_001243357; NP_001243358; NP_006448	NP_001177781; NP_001177782; NP_001177783; NP_001177784; NP_001177785 NP_001177786; NP_062782; NP_062783; NP_072048
Location (UCSC)	Chr 4: 94.45 – 94.67 Mb	Chr 3: 141.95 – 142.1 Mb
PubMed search
- Wikidata
View/Edit Human	View/Edit Mouse

PDZ and LIM domain protein 5 is a protein that in humans is encoded by the PDLIM5 gene.

The protein encoded by this gene is a LIM domain protein. LIM domains are cysteine-rich double zinc fingers composed of 50 to 60 amino acids that are involved in protein-protein interactions. LIM domain-containing proteins are scaffolds for the formation of multiprotein complexes. The proteins are involved in cytoskeleton organization, cell lineage specification, organ development, and oncogenesis. The encoded protein is also a member of the Enigma class of proteins, a family of proteins that possess a 100-amino acid PDZ domain in the N-terminus and 1 to 3 LIM domains in the C terminus. Multiple transcript variants encoding different isoforms have been found for this gene, although not all of them have been fully characterized.

== Interactions ==
PDLIM5 has been shown to interact with PRKCB1.
