= Christos S. Bartsocas =

- Χρήστος Σπ. Μπαρτσόκας
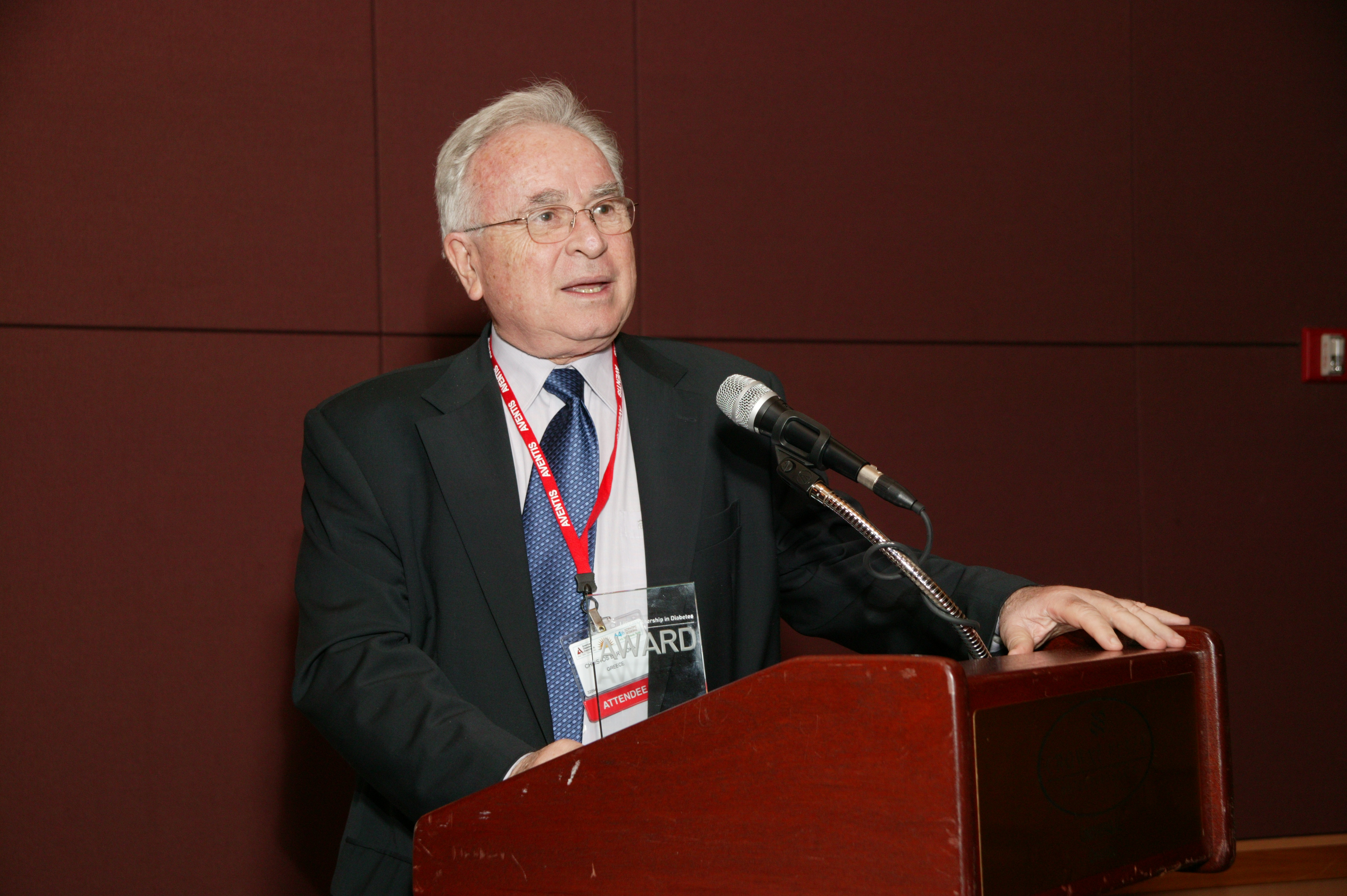
- Dr. Christos S. Bartsocas speaking at a conference.
- Born: June 20, 1937 (age 89); Athens, Greece
- Education: National and Kapodistrian University of Athens (NKUA)
- Scientific career
- Fields: Pediatrics, Clinical Genetics and Endocrinology
- Workplaces: National and Kapodistrian University of Athens

Christos S. Bartsocas (Greek: Χρήστος Σπ. Μπαρτσόκας), is a Greek pediatric endocrinologist and clinical geneticist, presently Professor Emeritus at the National and Kapodistrian University of Athens. He is known for the first report of the Bartsocas-Papas Syndrome and for his contribution to the development of pediatric diabetes care in Greece.

== Education ==
Bartsocas was born in Athens, Greece, in 1937. He received his elementary education at the Experimental School of the University of Athens, which was completed at South Pasadena High School, South Pasadena, California, on an American Field Service scholarship, in 1954. He attended the University of Athens Medical School receiving his MD in 1960 and a D.Med.Sc. degree in 1963. Between 1960 and 1963, he served as a Medical Officer in the Hellenic Navy. He began training in pediatrics in Athens, followed by a senior assistant residency and a senior residency at the Department of Pediatrics, Yale University School of Medicine (1964–1966). Training in Pediatric Endocrinology, Metabolism and Medical Genetics followed at the Children's Endocrine Service of the Massachusetts General Hospital/ Harvard Medical School (1966–1968).

== Positions held ==
Bartsocas served at senior positions in the Children's Hospitals in Athens and the University of Athens Medical and Nursing Faculties, being elected Lecturer in 1977 and Professor of Pediatrics in 1993, and retired in 2004 as a Professor Emeritus.

Nonetheless, he organized and ran the “Mitera” Children's Hospital in Athens (2003–2014). Finally, he retired as a Consultant for Development from the Athens Medical Center in 2017. He is Board Certified in Pediatrics (FAAP) and Clinical Genetics (FACMG) in the US, as well as in Pediatrics and Endocrinology in Greece. He held Licenses-Board Certifications to practice Medicine in Athens (Greece), Massachusetts and Illinois.

He was also the national representative at the European Union Committee of Experts on Rare Diseases - EUCERD (2010–2015), and the corresponding Fellow American Academy of Pediatrics, of the American College of Medical Genetics and Genomics and Corresponding member of the Société Française de Pédiatrie and the Deutsche Gesellschaft für Kinder- und Jugendmedizin.

== Offices held ==
Office	Year	Organization
Founder and President	1983-2007	Greek Affiliate of the Juvenile Diabetes Research Foundation
President	1990-1992	European Society of Human Genetics
President	1993-1994	Hellenic Diabetes Association
Board Member	1992-2014	Hellenic National Center for Diabetes
Advisory Council Member	1992-1994	ISPAD
Corresponding Editorial Board Member	1980-2004	American Journal of Medical Genetics
President	1986-1987	Institute of Child Health Athens
President	2009-2018	Μαζί με το Παίδι charity (Together for Children)

== Teaching ==
Apart from teaching Pediatrics, Diabetes and Medical Genetics at undergraduate, graduate and postgraduate levels in Greece, Bartsocas taught as Guest Lecturer in a number of locations.

Organization	Year	State/Country
Massachusetts General Hospital	1972	Massachusetts
Loyola University Stritch School of Medicine	1973	Illinois
UC San Diego	1976	California
University of Amman	1976	Jordan
Sunrise Hospital	1979	Nevada
University of Hamburg	1979	Germany
University of Essen	1979	Germany
University of Munster	1979	Germany
Yale University	1981	Connecticut
University of Helsinki	1982, 1992	Finland
SUNY at Stony Brook	1985-1987	New York
Ondokuz Mayis University	1991	Turkey
University of Cape Town	1992	South Africa
University of Ghent	1994	Belgium

== Contributions ==
Christos S. Bartsocas, has been the leading figure for the development of diabetes care in children and adolescents in Greece since the 1970s. Following his return to Greece he established a clinic for patients with diabetes at the "P.&A. Kyriakou" Athens Children's Hospital in the 1970s, which was declared officially as a Pediatric Diabetes Center in 1990, the only one in the country for some time. He was able to run the Center until his retirement from the University of Athens in September 2004. Parents’ groups and seminars for physicians and parents have been organized by Bartsocas since the 1970s and summer camps for patients have been organized every year since 1997.

With assistance from the Pediatric Nursing Faculty of the University of Athens, Bartsocas organizes an annual course for nurses’ certification in Diabetes Education and Care, as well as a school nurses’ training program for diabetes. Since 1976, Bartsocas was the organizer of International Clinical Genetics Seminars every 3 years, held until 2004.

Bartsocas organized the 1993 ISGD/ISPAD Annual Meeting, aboard MTS “Arcadia” on the Aegean Sea.

He was the Vice-President of the EASD Meeting in Athens, 2005, and the organizer of the Satellite Meeting in Delphi, titled "2000 years of Diabetes".

Bartsocas established support groups for parents of children with diabetes (of which he was the founder and first president), a parents' association (PEAND) and the Greek Affiliate of Juvenile Diabetes Research Foundation (1983–2007).

== Research ==
Bartsocas' research focused initially on metabolic amino-acid transport diseases (Lowe's syndrome, Hartnup disease) and particularly on the lysosomal disorders) reporting Type C Sanfilippo disease as well as dysmorphology. Most important contribution was the report of a severe malformation, the so-called now Bartsocas-Papas syndrome, in the Journal of Medical Genetics in 1972, 9:222-226. He contributed to the identification of G6PD "Ierapetra" with E. Beutler and the Samfilippo Type C syndrome with H. Kresse. The fast increasing prevalence of Type 1 diabetes mellitus has been the focus of his interest during the last four decades. He actively participated in the European Union Concerted Action groups EURODIAB, DIAMOND, ENDIT, VirDiab, SmartDiab etc., the Juvenile Diabetes Research Foundation (JDRF) and the International Society of Pediatric & Adolescent Diabetes (ISPAD). Nonetheless he has actively contributed to the Rare Diseases in Europe, as the Greek representative in EUCERD.

== Commendations ==
Bartsocas has received many honors, among them:

Award	Year	Organization	Country
Special Mention	1961-1963	Hellenic Navy	Greece
Fellowship	1966-1967	USPHS	USA
Rosemary F. Dybwad Award	1968	National Association for Retarded Children	USA
Research Fellowship	1971	NATO	International
One Step Closer Award	1987	Juvenile Diabetes Research Foundation	USA
You are #1 in our Hearts Award	1997	Juvenile Diabetes Research Foundation	USA
Lilly Partnership in Diabetes Award	2004	ADA	USA
Great Benefactor	2015	Leros Island	Greece

Bartsocas has also received multiple Honorary and Research Awards by the Hellenic Diabetes Association, the Hellenic Diabetes Federation, the Hellenic Society for Endocrinology, the Hellenic Pediatric Association, Lions Clubs of Greece and civic organizations.

== Publications ==
Bartsocas has published over 200 scientific articles.

Some of his most important books are listed below:

=== Books ===
Titles	Year	Publishing Location	Publishing Firm	ISBN
Μυκηναϊκή Ιατρική	1964	Athens		8902706 (Note: As ISBNs did not exist at the time of the book's publication, this is a National Library of Medicine number.)
The Management of Genetic Disorders	1979	New York	Alan R. Liss	0-8451-0034-3
Progress in Dermatoglyphic Research	1982	New York	Alan R. Liss	0-8451-0084-X
Skeletal Dysplasias	1982	New York	Alan R. Liss	0-8451-0104-8
Endocrine Genetics and Genetics of Growth	1985	New York	Alan R. Liss	0-8451-5050-2
Genetics of Kidney Disorders	1989	New York	Alan R. Liss	0-8451-5155-X
Genetics of Neuromuscular Disorders	1989	New York	Alan R. Liss	0-8451-5156-8
Genetics of Hematological Disorders	1992	Washington D.C.	Hemisphere Publishing	1-56032-205-5
Dysmorphology and Genetics of Cardiovascular Disorders	1994	Athens	Zita Medical Publications	960-7144-16-3
Genetic Counseling in the Dawn of the 21st Century	1998	Athens	Zita Medical Publications	960-7144-45-7

=== Articles ===
- Bartsocas CS, Papas CV (1972) Popliteal pterygium syndrome - evidence for a severe autosomal recessive form. J Med Genet 9:222–226.
- Bartsocas CS, Leslie RDG (2002) Seminars in Medical Genetics: The Genetics of Diabetes Mellitus, American Journal of Medical Genetics, 115 (Supplement 1), May 30, 2002, 1-72.
- Bartsocas CS, "The Greek Contribution to Diabetes Research", Diabetes, Metabolism Research and Reviews 1999, 15:368.
- Shannon DC, "Innovation in Pediatrics: Massachusetts General Hospital 1910-2010", Small Batch Books, Amherst,MA, 2014 (pages 145-167).
- Bartsocas CS, Thier SO, Crawford JD., "Transport of L-methionine in rat intestine and kidney.", Pediatr Res. 1974 Jun;8(6):673-8.
- Corash L, Spielberg S, Bartsocas C, Boxer L, Steinherz R, Sheetz M, Egan M, Schlessleman J, Schulman JD. "Reduced chronic hemolysis during high-dose vitamin E administration in Mediterranean-type glucose-6-phosphate dehydrogenase deficiency". New England Journal Medicine, 1980 Aug 21;303(8):416-20.
- Bartsocas CS, Crawford JD. "Clinical phenotypes in kidney transport disorders.", Birth Defects Orig Artic Ser. 1974;10(4):118-26.
- Bartsocas CS, Erbe RW. "Lowe's syndrome. Absence of amino acid transport defect in cultured fibroblasts". Acta Paediatr Scand. 1973 Nov;62(6):615-6.
- Xu W, Westwood B, Bartsocas CS, Malcorra-Azpiazu JJ, Indrák K, Beutler E. "Glucose-6 phosphate dehydrogenase mutations and haplotypes in various ethnic groups", Blood. 1995 Jan 1;85(1):257-63.
- Beutler E, Westwood B, Prchal JT, Vaca G, Bartsocas CS, Baronciani L. "New glucose-6-phosphate dehydrogenase mutations from various ethnic groups", Blood. 1992 Jul 1;80(1):255-6
- Bartsocas CS, Gröbe H, van de Kamp JJ, von Figura K, Kresse H, Klein U, Giesberts MA. "Sanfilippo type C disease: clinical findings in four patients with a new variant of mucopolysaccharidosis III", Eur J Pediatr. 1979 Apr 3;130(4):251-8
