= Syngnathia =

Medical condition

Syngnathia is a congenital adhesion of the maxilla and mandible by fibrous bands.
