= Protein kinase C beta type =

Protein-coding gene in the species Homo sapiens

PRKCB
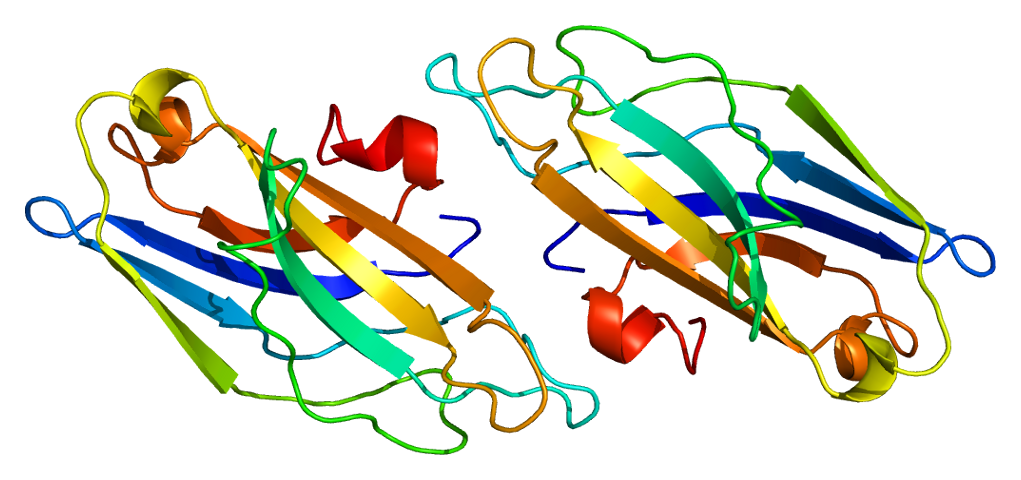

Identifiers
- Aliases: PRKCB, PKC-beta, PKCB, PRKCB1, PRKCB2, protein kinase C beta, PKCbeta, PKCI(2)
- External IDs: OMIM: 176970; MGI: 97596; GeneCards: PRKCB
Available structures
PDB	Ortholog search: PDBe RCSB
PDB	List of PDB id codes 2I0E
Enzyme activity
EC #	BRENDA	ExPASy	KEGG	MetaCyc
2.7.11.13	↗	↗	↗	↗

Gene location (Human)
Chr.	Chromosome 16 (human)
Band	16p12.2-p12.1	Start	23,835,983 bp
Band	16p12.2-p12.1	End	24,220,611 bp

Gene location (Mouse)
Chr.	Chromosome 7 (mouse)
Band	7 F2|7 65.75 cM	Start	121,887,974 bp
Band	7 F2|7 65.75 cM	End	122,233,625 bp
RNA expression pattern
Bgee	Human / Mouse (ortholog); Top expressed in: middle temporal gyrus; orbitofrontal cortex; frontal pole; Brodmann area 23; Brodmann area 46; superior frontal gyrus; Brodmann area 10; parietal lobe; Region I of hippocampus proper; postcentral gyrus / Top expressed in: dorsal striatum; olfactory tubercle; primary motor cortex; perirhinal cortex; Region I of hippocampus proper; cingulate gyrus; CA3 field; superior frontal gyrus; visual cortex; prefrontal cortex; More reference expression data
BioGPS	n/a
Gene ontology
Molecular function	transferase activity; nucleotide binding; protein kinase activity; protein kinase C activity; histone binding; zinc ion binding; calcium channel regulator activity; chromatin binding; metal ion binding; kinase activity; protein serine/threonine kinase activity; protein binding; androgen receptor binding; nuclear receptor coactivator activity; histone kinase activity (H3-T6 specific); ATP binding; protein kinase C binding; calcium-dependent protein kinase C activity
Cellular component	cytoplasm; membrane; plasma membrane; extracellular exosome; nucleus; nucleoplasm; cytosol; calyx of Held; presynaptic cytosol
Biological process	B cell receptor signaling pathway; cellular response to carbohydrate stimulus; positive regulation of vascular endothelial growth factor receptor signaling pathway; positive regulation of B cell receptor signaling pathway; intracellular signal transduction; response to hypoxia; regulation of transcription, DNA-templated; adaptive immune response; phosphorylation; immune system process; regulation of transcription by RNA polymerase II; cellular calcium ion homeostasis; transcription, DNA-templated; positive regulation of angiogenesis; platelet activation; protein phosphorylation; B cell activation; negative regulation of insulin receptor signaling pathway; mitotic nuclear membrane disassembly; negative regulation of glucose transmembrane transport; positive regulation of NF-kappaB transcription factor activity; peptidyl-serine phosphorylation; positive regulation of I-kappaB kinase/NF-kappaB signaling; calcium ion transport; signal transduction; lipoprotein transport; apoptotic process; regulation of myeloid cell differentiation; chromatin organization; presynaptic modulation of chemical synaptic transmission; positive regulation of nucleic acid-templated transcription; regulation of synaptic vesicle exocytosis
Sources:Amigo / QuickGO
Orthologs
Databases	NCBI: entry; OMA: entry
Species	Human	Mouse
Entrez	5579	18751
Ensembl	ENSG00000166501	ENSMUSG00000052889
UniProt	P05771	P68404
RefSeq (mRNA)	NM_212535; NM_002738	NM_008855; NM_001316672
RefSeq (protein)	NP_002729; NP_997700	NP_001303601; NP_032881
Location (UCSC)	Chr 16: 23.84 – 24.22 Mb	Chr 7: 121.89 – 122.23 Mb
PubMed search
- Wikidata
View/Edit Human	View/Edit Mouse

Protein kinase C beta type is an enzyme that in humans is encoded by the PRKCB gene.

Protein kinase C (PKC) is a family of serine- and threonine-specific protein kinases that can be activated by calcium and second messenger diacylglycerol. PKC family members phosphorylate a wide variety of protein targets and are known to be involved in diverse cellular signaling pathways. PKC family members also serve as major receptors for phorbol esters, a class of tumor promoters. Each member of the PKC family has a specific expression profile and is believed to play a distinct role in cells. The protein encoded by this gene is one of the PKC family members. This protein kinase has been reported to be involved in many different cellular functions, such as B cell activation, apoptosis induction, endothelial cell proliferation, and intestinal sugar absorption. Studies in mice also suggest that this kinase may also regulate neuronal functions and correlate fear-induced conflict behavior after stress. Alternatively spliced transcript variants encoding distinct isoforms have been reported. This gene could be associated with autism.

== Interactions ==
PRKCB1 has been shown to interact with RIPK4, beta adrenergic receptor kinase, PDLIM5 and GNB2L1.

== See also ==
- Protein kinase C
