= Skin dimple =

Depression in the skin

Skin dimples (also known as "Skin fossa") are deep cutaneous depressions that are seen most commonly on the cheeks or chin, occurring in a familial pattern suggestive of autosomal dominant inheritance.

== See also ==
- Sinus pericranii
- List of cutaneous conditions
