= Van der Woude syndrome =

- Specialty: Medical genetics
- Frequency: 0.005%

Van der Woude syndrome (VDWS) is a genetic disorder characterized by the combination of lower lip pits, cleft lip with or without cleft palate (CL/P), and cleft palate only (CPO). The frequency of orofacial clefts ranges from 1:1000 to 1:500 births worldwide, and there are more than 400 syndromes that involve CL/P. VWS is distinct from other clefting syndromes due to the combination of cleft lip and palate (CLP) and CPO within the same family. Other features frequently associated with VWS include hypodontia in 10-81% of cases, narrow arched palate, congenital heart disease, heart murmur and cerebral abnormalities, syndactyly of the hands, polythelia, ankyloglossia, and adhesions between the upper and lower gum pads.

The association between lower lip pits and cleft lip and/or palate was first described by Anne Van der Woude in 1954. The worldwide disease incidence ranges from 1:100,000 to 1:40,000.

== Genetics ==
Van der Woude syndrome is inherited as an autosomal dominant disease caused by a mutation in a single gene with equal distribution between the sexes. The disease has high penetrance at about 96% but the phenotypic expression varies from lower lip pits with cleft lip and cleft palate to no visible abnormalities. Approximately 88% of VWS patients display lower lip pits, and in about 64% of cases lip pits are the only visible defect. Reported clefting covers a wide range including submucous cleft palate, incomplete unilateral CL, bifid uvula, and complete bilateral CLP. VWS is the most common orofacial clefting syndrome, accounting for 2% of CLP cases.

The majority of VWS cases are caused by haploinsufficiency due to mutations in the interferon regulatory factor 6 gene (IRF6) on chromosome 1 in the 1q32-q41 region known as VWS locus 1. A second, less common, causative locus is found at 1p34, known as VWS locus 2 (VWS2). More recent work has shown that GRHL3 is the VWS2 gene. Grhl3 is downstream of Irf6 in oral epithelium, suggesting a common molecular pathway leading to VWS. Prior work also suggested WDR65 as a candidate gene. IRF6 contains two non-coding and seven coding exons and is part of a family of nine transcription factors with a highly conserved helix-turn-helix DNA binding domain called the Smad-interferon regulatory factor binding domain (SMIR). Mutations in coding or non-coding IRF6 exons can result in Van der Woude syndrome. Due to the wide range of expressivity, it is also believed that other unidentified loci contribute to disease development.

An example of the clear phenotypic variability is a monozygotic twin study conducted by Jobling et al. (2010). Two monozygotic female twins had the same IRF6 mutation; however Twin A was born with a bilateral cleft lip, whereas Twin B had bilateral lip pits and no orofacial clefting. Both twins were diagnosed with VWS. The twins' father had lip pits alone and a family history of CLP, CP, CL, and/or lip pits. Both twins were diagnosed with VWS. Polymerase chain reaction (PCR) amplification was done for all exons of IRF6, and a missense mutation was discovered in exon 4. The tyrosine in the normal protein at this position is conserved across mammals, frogs, and chickens, so despite the fact that it was a previously unreported mutation, it was expected to be deleterious. This study is not the first case of different phenotypes occurring between monozygotic twins. Possible causes of phenotypic variability include variations in the intrauterine environment, epigenetic differences, or chance effects.

== Pathophysiology ==
Lip pits were first reported in 1845 by Demarquay who thought they were indentations made by the upper incisors. Today it is known that they occur during embryogenesis due to IRF6 mutations. On day 32 of embryonic development there are four growth centers of the lower lip divided by two lateral grooves and one median. By day 38 of normal development, the grooves have disappeared. However, when growth of the mandibular process is impeded, a lip pit occurs. Lip pits begin to develop on day 36. Cleft lip begins to develop on day 40, and cleft palate emerges on day 50 of development.

There are three types of lip pits, which are classified according to their location: midline upper, commissural, and lower lip. The most common phenotype is two symmetrical lower lip pits flanking both sides of the midline in the bilateral paramedial sinuses. Lower lip pits may also be bilaterally, unilaterally, or medially asymmetrical. The occurrence of a single lip pit is considered incomplete expression, and it typically occurs on the left side of the lower lip. There are also three different shapes for lip pits, the most common being circular or oval; less common forms include slit-like or transverse. The lip pits extend into the orbicularis oris muscle, ending in blind sacs surrounded by mucous glands. In some cases mucus is excreted when the muscles contract.

== Diagnosis ==
Clinical diagnosis based on orofacial clefts and lip pits typically occurs shortly after birth. Certain defects may be difficult to diagnose, particularly a submucous cleft palate. This form of CP may not be detected except through finger palpation, as the mucosa covering the palate is intact, but the muscles underneath have lost their proper attachments. Feeding problems, impaired speech, and hearing loss are symptoms of a submucous cleft palate. Furthermore, approximately 15% of VWS cases with orofacial clefts, in the absence of prominent lip pits, cannot be easily distinguished from non-syndromic forms of orofacial clefting. Therefore, it is very important to closely examine these patients as well as their relatives for lip pits, especially when there is a family history of mixed clefting, in order to make the VWS diagnosis. Dentists may also play an important role in diagnosing cases not detected at birth, as they detect hypodontia commonly associated with VWS. The patients most commonly lack the upper second premolars followed by the lower second premolars and upper lateral incisors. The absence of these teeth might play a role in the constricting of the dental arches.

The clinical signs seen in VWS are similar to those of popliteal pterygium syndrome (PPS), which is also an autosomal dominant disease. Approximately 46% of affected individuals have lip pits; other features include genital abnormalities, abnormal skin near nails, syndactyly of fingers and toes, and webbed skin. The disease is also caused by mutations in IRF6; however, they occur in the DNA-binding domain of IRF6 and result in a dominant negative effect in which the mutated IRF6 transcription factor interferes with the ability of the wild type copy to function, in the case of a heterozygous individual.

=== Genetic Counseling ===
Genetic counseling for VWS involves discussion of disease transmission in the autosomal dominant manner and possibilities for penetrance and expression in offspring. Autosomal dominance means affected parents have a 50% chance of passing on their mutated IRF6 allele to a their child. Furthermore, if a cleft patient has lip pits, he or she has a ten times greater risk of having a child with cleft lip with or without cleft palate than a cleft patient who does not have lip pits. Types of clefting between parents and affected children are significantly associated; however, different types of clefts may occur horizontally and vertically within the same pedigree. In cases where clefting is the only symptom, a complete family history must be taken to ensure the patient does not have non-syndromic clefting.

== Treatment ==
Lip pits may be surgically removed either for aesthetic reasons or discomfort due to inflammation caused by bacterial infections or chronic saliva excretion, though spontaneous shrinkage of the lip pits has occurred in some rare cases. Chronic inflammation has also been reported to cause squamous-cell carcinoma. It is essential to completely remove the entire lip pit canal, as mucoid cysts can develop if mucous glands are not removed. A possible side effect of removing the lip pits is a loose lip muscle. Other conditions associated with VWS, including CL, CP, congenital heart defects, etc. are surgically corrected or otherwise treated as they would be if they were non-syndromic.
