= RIPK4 =

Protein-coding gene in humans

Identifiers
- Aliases: RIPK4, ANKK2, ANKRD3, DIK, NKRD3, PKK, PPS2, RIP4, receptor interacting serine/threonine kinase 4, CHANDS
- External IDs: OMIM: 605706; MGI: 1919638; GeneCards: RIPK4
Enzyme activity
EC #	BRENDA	ExPASy	KEGG	MetaCyc
2.7.11.1	↗	↗	↗	↗

Gene location (Human)
Chr.	Chromosome 21 (human)
Band	21q22.3	Start	41,739,369 bp
Band	21q22.3	End	41,767,089 bp

Gene location (Mouse)
Chr.	Chromosome 16 (mouse)
Band	16|16 C4	Start	97,543,133 bp
Band	16|16 C4	End	97,564,987 bp
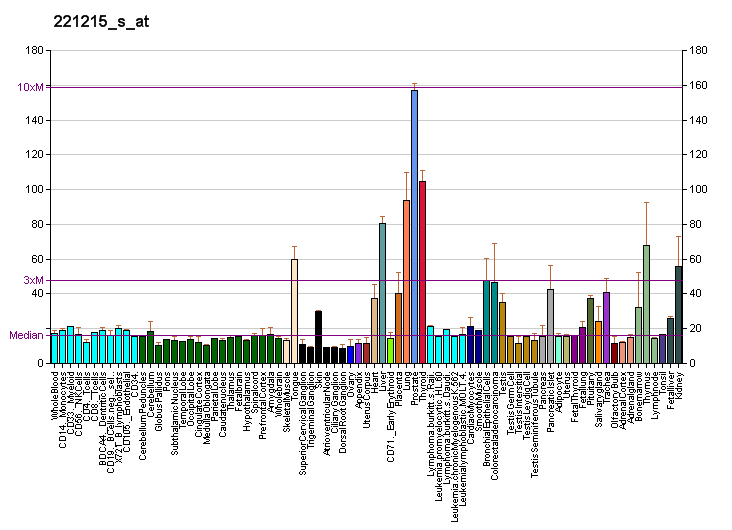
RNA expression pattern
Bgee	Human / Mouse (ortholog); Top expressed in: gingival epithelium; palpebral conjunctiva; oral cavity; amniotic fluid; epithelium of bronchus; mucosa of paranasal sinus; nasal epithelium; bronchial epithelial cell; mucosa of pharynx; kidney tubule / Top expressed in: transitional epithelium of urinary bladder; conjunctival fornix; hair follicle; seminal vesicula; skin of external ear; skin of abdomen; skin of back; epithelium of small intestine; cornea; vestibular membrane of cochlear duct; More reference expression data
BioGPS	More reference expression data
Gene ontology
Molecular function	protein serine/threonine kinase activity; ATP binding; kinase activity; nucleotide binding; protein kinase activity; transferase activity; protein binding
Cellular component	membrane; cytoplasm
Biological process	protein phosphorylation; morphogenesis of an epithelium; positive regulation of NF-kappaB transcription factor activity; phosphorylation
Sources:Amigo / QuickGO
Orthologs
Databases	NCBI: entry; OMA: entry
Species	Human	Mouse
Entrez	54101	72388
Ensembl	ENSG00000183421	ENSMUSG00000005251
UniProt	P57078	Q9ERK0
RefSeq (mRNA)	NM_020639	NM_023663
RefSeq (protein)	n/a	NP_076152
Location (UCSC)	Chr 21: 41.74 – 41.77 Mb	Chr 16: 97.54 – 97.56 Mb
PubMed search
- Wikidata
View/Edit Human	View/Edit Mouse

Receptor-interacting serine/threonine-protein kinase 4 is an enzyme that in humans is encoded by the RIPK4 gene.

The protein encoded by this gene is a serine/threonine protein kinase that interacts with protein kinase C-delta. The encoded protein can also activate NFkappaB and is required for keratinocyte differentiation. This kinase undergoes autophosphorylation.

== Interactions ==
RIPK4 has been shown to interact with PRKCB1.
