= IRF6 =

Protein-coding gene in humans

Identifiers
- Aliases: IRF6, LPS, OFC6, PIT, PPS, PPS1, VWS, VWS1, interferon regulatory factor 6
- External IDs: OMIM: 607199; MGI: 1859211; GeneCards: IRF6

Gene location (Human)
Chr.	Chromosome 1 (human)
Band	1q32.2	Start	209,785,617 bp
Band	1q32.2	End	209,806,175 bp

Gene location (Mouse)
Chr.	Chromosome 1 (mouse)
Band	1 H6|1 97.6 cM	Start	192,835,419 bp
Band	1 H6|1 97.6 cM	End	192,854,331 bp
RNA expression pattern
Bgee	Human / Mouse (ortholog); Top expressed in: secondary oocyte; skin of thigh; gingival epithelium; skin of abdomen; skin of hip; pancreatic ductal cell; hair follicle; skin of arm; olfactory zone of nasal mucosa; mucosa of ileum / Top expressed in: corneal stroma; conjunctival fornix; Paneth cell; epidermis; urothelium; hair follicle; transitional epithelium of urinary bladder; epithelium of stomach; skin of back; ileum; More reference expression data
BioGPS	n/a
Gene ontology
Molecular function	DNA binding; DNA-binding transcription factor activity; protein binding; DNA-binding transcription activator activity, RNA polymerase II-specific; sequence-specific DNA binding; DNA-binding transcription factor activity, RNA polymerase II-specific
Cellular component	cytoplasm; extracellular exosome; nucleus; cytosol; cell junction
Biological process	cell differentiation; regulation of transcription, DNA-templated; cell development; interferon-gamma-mediated signaling pathway; transcription, DNA-templated; mammary gland epithelial cell differentiation; keratinocyte differentiation; positive regulation of transcription, DNA-templated; keratinocyte proliferation; type I interferon signaling pathway; skin development; negative regulation of cell population proliferation; transcription by RNA polymerase II; positive regulation of transcription by RNA polymerase II; immune system process; roof of mouth development
Sources:Amigo / QuickGO
Orthologs
Databases	NCBI: entry; OMA: entry
Species	Human	Mouse
Entrez	3664	54139
Ensembl	ENSG00000117595	ENSMUSG00000026638
UniProt	O14896	P97431
RefSeq (mRNA)	NM_006147; NM_001206696	NM_016851; NM_178083
RefSeq (protein)	NP_001193625; NP_006138	NP_058547
Location (UCSC)	Chr 1: 209.79 – 209.81 Mb	Chr 1: 192.84 – 192.85 Mb
PubMed search
- Wikidata
View/Edit Human	View/Edit Mouse

Interferon regulatory factor 6 also known as IRF6 is a protein that in humans is encoded by the IRF6 gene.

== Function ==
This gene encodes a member of the interferon regulatory transcription factor (IRF) family. Family members share a highly conserved N-terminal helix-turn-helix DNA-binding domain and a less conserved C-terminal protein-binding domain. The function of IRF6 is related to the formation of connective tissue, for example that of the palate. This gene encodes a member of the interferon regulatory transcription factor (IRF) family. In addition, it has been observed that IRF6 gene is under epigenetic regulation by promoter methylation.

== Pathology ==
A mutation of the IRF6 gene can lead to the autosomal dominant van der Woude syndrome (VWS) or the related popliteal pterygium syndrome (PPS). Van der Woude syndrome can include cleft lip and palate features along with dental anomalies and lip fistulas. In addition, common alleles in IRF6 have also been associated with non-syndromic cases of cleft lip and/or palate through genome-wide association studies and in many candidate gene studies. These disorders are caused by mutations in the IRF6 gene and some of the phenotypic heterogeneity is due to different types of IRF6 mutations. One explanation for this phenotypic variation between syndromes is based on a differential impact on the structure of the dimerized mutant proteins. VWS mutations appear to result in haploinsufficiency while PPS mutations may be dominant negative in nature. The spectrum of mutations in VWS and PPS has been recently summarized. IRF6 has been shown to play a critical role in keratinocyte development. A role for IRF6 in the common forms of cleft lip and palate has also been demonstrated and may explain ~20% of cases of cleft lip only. Variants in IRF6 have yielded consistent evidence of association with syndromic cleft and/or palate across multiple studies. A study by Birnbaum and colleagues in 2009 confirmed the impact of this gene on the etiology of cleft lip and/or palate, and the GENEVA Cleft Consortium study, which studied families from multiple populations, reconfirmed the findings that IRF6 mutations are strongly associated with cleft and/or palate. A role of IRF6 in causing cleft lip and/or palate is further supported by analysis of IRF6 mutant mice which exhibit a hyper-proliferative epidermis that fails to undergo terminal differentiation, leading to multiple epithelial adhesions that can occlude the oral cavity and result in cleft palate. Research on animal models indicate IRF6 determines keratinocyte proliferation and also has a key role in the formation of oral periderm. Recently, through utilization of mouse genetics, gene expression analyses, chromatin immunoprecipitation studies and luciferase reporter assays, it has been shown that IRF6 is a direct target of p63, which underlies several malformation syndromes that include cleft features, and p63 activates IRF6 transcription through the IRF6 enhancer element. Variation in the enhancer element increases susceptibility to cleft lip only. Both cleft lip with or without a cleft palate and cleft palate only features have been seen in families with an IRF6 mutation. In addition, different types of clefts can segregate within the same family.

== Epigenetics ==
The IRF6 aberrant promoter DNA hypermethylation has been observed associated with cancer onset/progression. Indeed, this improper epigenetic phenomenon has been observed in women affected by Vulvar Squamous cell carcinoma arose from vulver lichen sclerosus. Methylation of the IRF6 promoter may be a marker of cancer risk in patients affected by this disease.

== Cancer ==
IRF6 gene has been observed progressively downregulated in Human papillomavirus-positive neoplastic keratinocytes derived from uterine cervical preneoplastic lesions at different levels of malignancy. For this reason, this gene is likely to be associated with tumorigenesis and may be a potential prognostic marker for uterine cervical preneoplastic lesions progression. Similarly, IRF6 has been found to be genetically and epigenetically disregulated in Vulvar cancer.

== See also ==
- Interferon regulatory factors
