= SPSB1 =

Protein-coding gene in humans

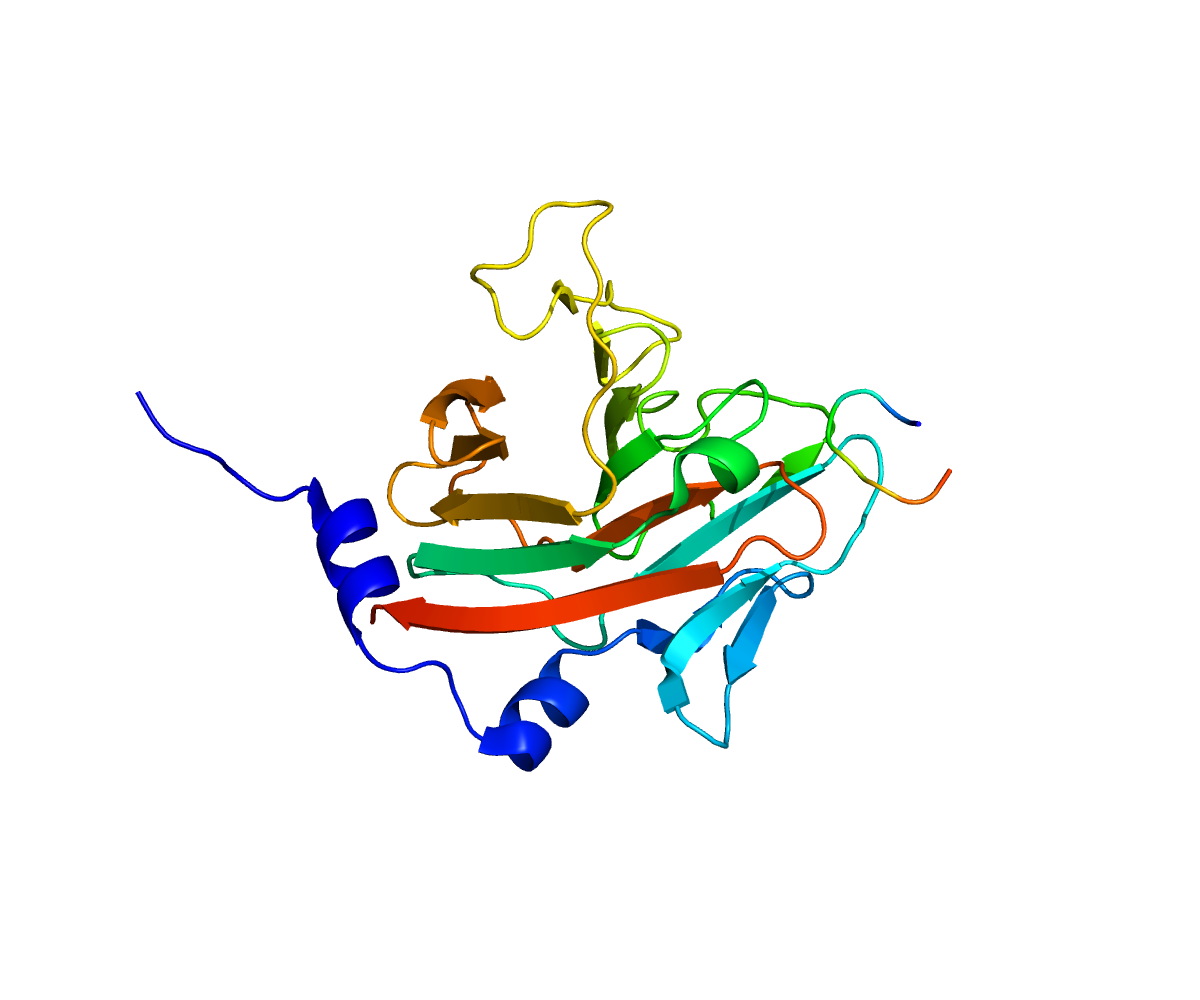

Identifiers
- Aliases: SPSB1, SSB-1, SSB1, splA/ryanodine receptor domain and SOCS box containing 1
- External IDs: OMIM: 611657; MGI: 1921896; GeneCards: SPSB1
Available structures
PDB	Ortholog search: PDBe RCSB
PDB	List of PDB id codes 2JK9, 3F2O

Gene location (Human)
Chr.	Chromosome 1 (human)
Band	1p36.22	Start	9,292,894 bp
Band	1p36.22	End	9,369,532 bp

Gene location (Mouse)
Chr.	Chromosome 4 (mouse)
Band	4|4 E2	Start	149,980,740 bp
Band	4|4 E2	End	150,039,500 bp
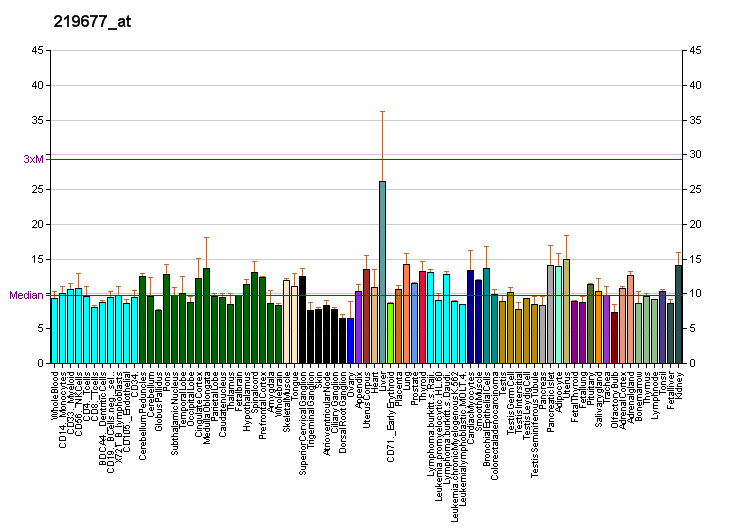
RNA expression pattern
Bgee	Human / Mouse (ortholog); Top expressed in: decidua; Descending thoracic aorta; ascending aorta; tibial arteries; gastric mucosa; saphenous vein; gallbladder; vena cava; right coronary artery; left coronary artery / Top expressed in: decidua; cumulus cell; gastrula; cardiac muscle tissue of left ventricle; molar; ascending aorta; epithelium of lens; aortic valve; tunica media of zone of aorta; ankle; More reference expression data
BioGPS	More reference expression data
Gene ontology
Molecular function	protein binding; ubiquitin-protein transferase activity; ubiquitin ligase-substrate adaptor activity
Cellular component	cytoplasm; cytosol; SCF ubiquitin ligase complex
Biological process	protein ubiquitination; protein polyubiquitination; post-translational protein modification; ubiquitin-dependent protein catabolic process; proteasome-mediated ubiquitin-dependent protein catabolic process
Sources:Amigo / QuickGO
Orthologs
Databases	NCBI: entry; OMA: entry
Species	Human	Mouse
Entrez	80176	74646
Ensembl	ENSG00000171621	ENSMUSG00000039911
UniProt	Q96BD6	Q9D5L7
RefSeq (mRNA)	NM_025106	NM_029035
RefSeq (protein)	NP_079382	NP_083311
Location (UCSC)	Chr 1: 9.29 – 9.37 Mb	Chr 4: 149.98 – 150.04 Mb
PubMed search
- Wikidata
View/Edit Human	View/Edit Mouse

SPRY domain-containing SOCS box protein 1 is a protein that in humans is encoded by the SPSB1 gene.
