= TRAPPC3 =

Protein-coding gene in humans

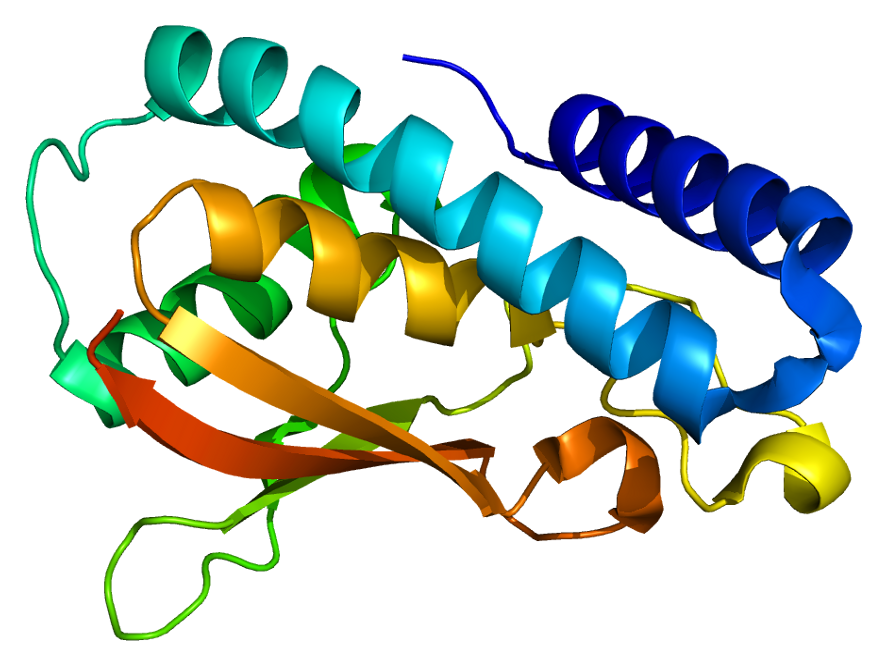

Identifiers
- Aliases: TRAPPC3, BET3, trafficking protein particle complex 3, trafficking protein particle complex subunit 3
- External IDs: OMIM: 610955; MGI: 1351486; GeneCards: TRAPPC3
Available structures
PDB	Ortholog search: PDBe RCSB
PDB	List of PDB id codes 1SZ7, 2C0J, 2CFH, 3KXC

Gene location (Human)
Chr.	Chromosome 1 (human)
Band	1p34.3	Start	36,136,570 bp
Band	1p34.3	End	36,156,053 bp

Gene location (Mouse)
Chr.	Chromosome 4 (mouse)
Band	4|4 D2.2	Start	126,156,118 bp
Band	4|4 D2.2	End	126,169,676 bp
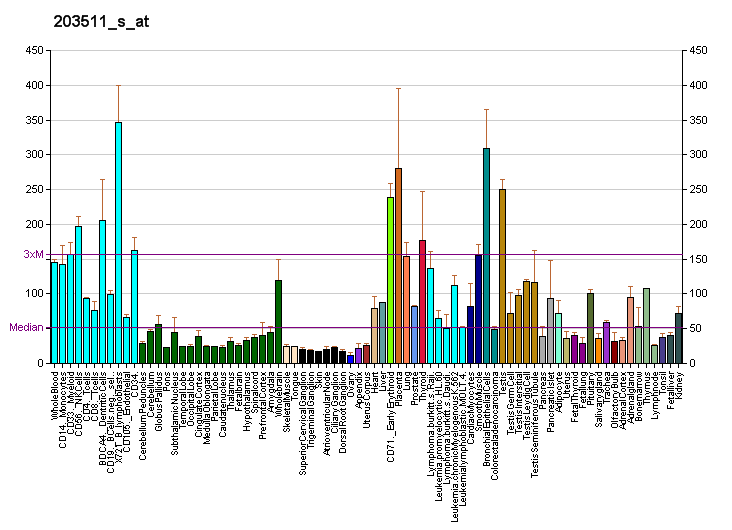

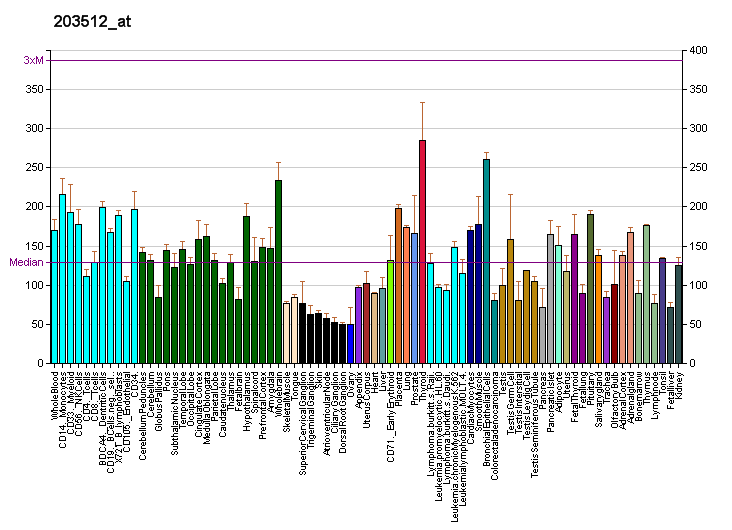
RNA expression pattern
Bgee	Human / Mouse (ortholog); Top expressed in: right adrenal gland; right adrenal cortex; left adrenal gland; left adrenal cortex; right lobe of thyroid gland; islet of Langerhans; left lobe of thyroid gland; right coronary artery; muscle layer of sigmoid colon; left testis / Top expressed in: calvaria; neural layer of retina; medial ganglionic eminence; cerebellar cortex; dentate gyrus of hippocampal formation granule cell; right kidney; stroma of bone marrow; choroid plexus; lip; Epithelium of choroid plexus; More reference expression data
BioGPS	More reference expression data
Gene ontology
Molecular function	protein binding
Cellular component	Golgi apparatus; endoplasmic reticulum; Golgi membrane; cytosol; TRAPP complex; cis-Golgi network membrane
Biological process	COPII vesicle coating; vesicle-mediated transport; Golgi vesicle transport; endoplasmic reticulum to Golgi vesicle-mediated transport; intra-Golgi vesicle-mediated transport
Sources:Amigo / QuickGO
Orthologs
Databases	NCBI: entry; OMA: entry
Species	Human	Mouse
Entrez	27095	27096
Ensembl	ENSG00000054116	ENSMUSG00000028847
UniProt	O43617	O55013
RefSeq (mRNA)	NM_001270894; NM_001270895; NM_001270896; NM_001270897; NM_014408	NM_013718
RefSeq (protein)	NP_001257823; NP_001257824; NP_001257825; NP_001257826; NP_055223	NP_038746
Location (UCSC)	Chr 1: 36.14 – 36.16 Mb	Chr 4: 126.16 – 126.17 Mb
PubMed search
- Wikidata
View/Edit Human	View/Edit Mouse

Trafficking protein particle complex subunit 3 is a protein that in humans is encoded by the TRAPPC3 gene.
