= UAP1 =

Protein-coding gene in humans

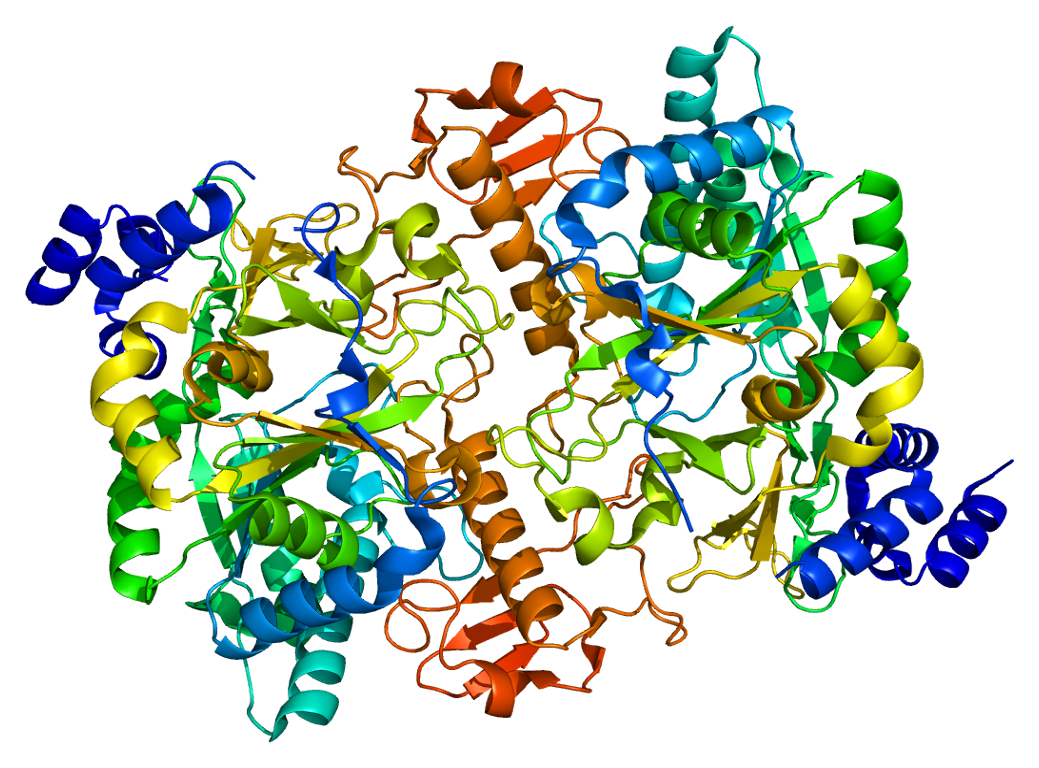

Identifiers
- Aliases: UAP1, AGX, AGX1, AGX2, SPAG2, UDP-N-acetylglucosamine pyrophosphorylase 1
- External IDs: OMIM: 602862; MGI: 1334459; GeneCards: UAP1
Available structures
PDB	Ortholog search: PDBe RCSB
PDB	List of PDB id codes 1JV1, 1JV3, 1JVD, 1JVG
Enzyme activity
EC #	BRENDA	ExPASy	KEGG	MetaCyc
2.7.7.23	↗	↗	↗	↗
2.7.7.83	↗	↗	↗	↗

Gene location (Human)
Chr.	Chromosome 1 (human)
Band	1q23.3	Start	162,561,722 bp
Band	1q23.3	End	162,601,240 bp

Gene location (Mouse)
Chr.	Chromosome 1 (mouse)
Band	1|1 H3	Start	169,969,507 bp
Band	1|1 H3	End	170,002,526 bp
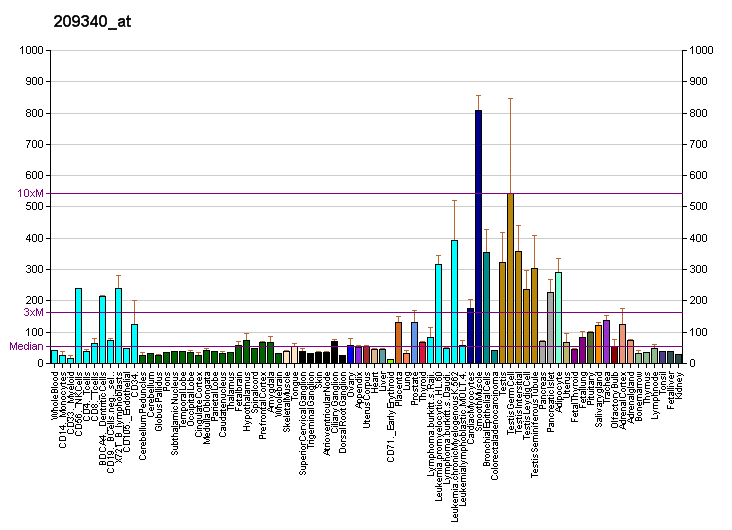
RNA expression pattern
Bgee	Human / Mouse (ortholog); Top expressed in: synovial joint; parotid gland; mucosa of sigmoid colon; cartilage tissue; gastric mucosa; bronchial epithelial cell; pericardium; synovial membrane; nasal epithelium; left testis / Top expressed in: parotid gland; morula; lumbar spinal ganglion; lacrimal gland; submandibular gland; left colon; ankle joint; cumulus cell; right kidney; conjunctival fornix; More reference expression data
BioGPS	More reference expression data
Gene ontology
Molecular function	transferase activity; uridylyltransferase activity; nucleotidyltransferase activity; carbohydrate binding; identical protein binding; UDP-N-acetylglucosamine diphosphorylase activity
Cellular component	plasma membrane; nucleoplasm; cytoplasm; cytosol
Biological process	UDP-N-acetylglucosamine metabolic process; metabolism; UDP-N-acetylglucosamine biosynthetic process
Sources:Amigo / QuickGO
Orthologs
Databases	NCBI: entry; OMA: entry
Species	Human	Mouse
Entrez	6675	107652
Ensembl	ENSG00000117143	ENSMUSG00000026670
UniProt	Q16222	Q91YN5
RefSeq (mRNA)	NM_003115; NM_001324113; NM_001324114; NM_001324115; NM_001324116 NM_001324117; NM_001388401; NM_001388402; NM_001399790; NM_001399791; NM_001399792; NM_001399793	NM_133806; NM_001305045; NM_001305046
RefSeq (protein)	NP_001311042; NP_001311043; NP_001311044; NP_001311045; NP_001311046 NP_003106	NP_001291974; NP_001291975; NP_598567
Location (UCSC)	Chr 1: 162.56 – 162.6 Mb	Chr 1: 169.97 – 170 Mb
PubMed search
- Wikidata
View/Edit Human	View/Edit Mouse

UDP-N-acetylhexosamine pyrophosphorylase is an enzyme that in humans is encoded by the UAP1 gene.
