= INTS3 =

Protein-coding gene in humans

Identifiers
- Aliases: INTS3, C1orf193, C1orf60, INT3, SOSS-A, SOSSA, integrator complex subunit 3
- External IDs: OMIM: 611347; MGI: 2140050; GeneCards: INTS3
Available structures
| PDB | Ortholog search: PDBe RCSB |
| PDB | List of PDB id codes 4OWT, 4OWW, 4OWX |

Gene location (Human)
| Chr. | Chromosome 1 (human) |
| Band | 1q21.3 | Start | 153,728,050 bp |
| Band | 1q21.3 | End | 153,774,808 bp |

Gene location (Mouse)
| Chr. | Chromosome 3 (mouse) |
| Band | 3|3 F1 | Start | 90,298,695 bp |
| Band | 3|3 F1 | End | 90,340,929 bp |
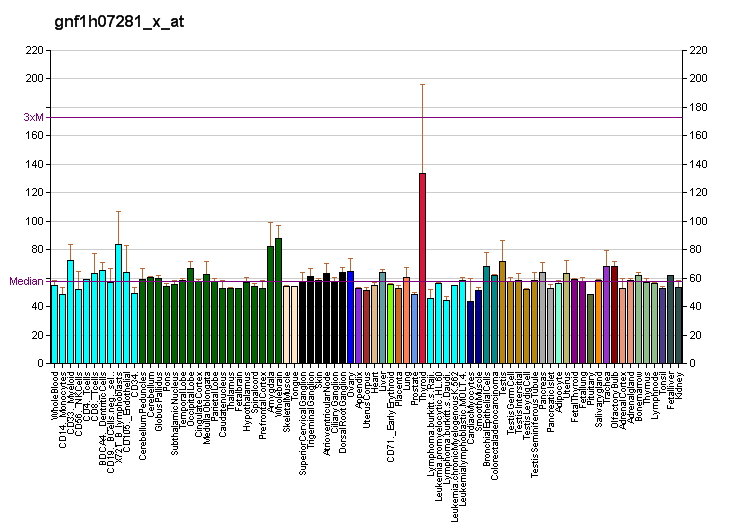

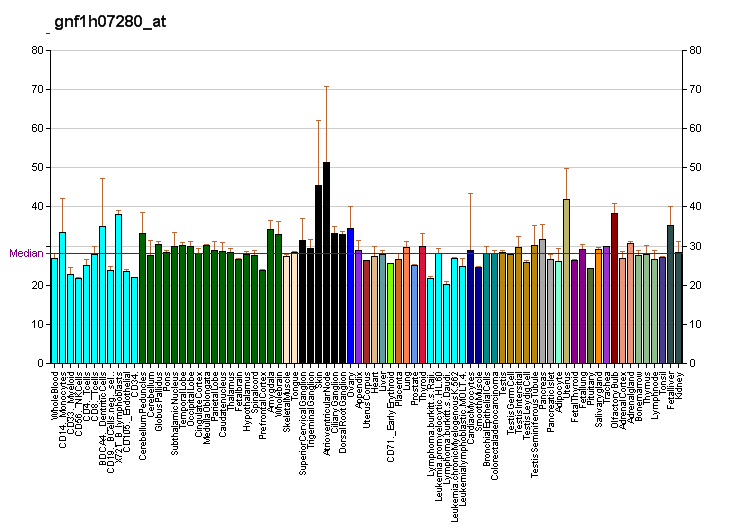

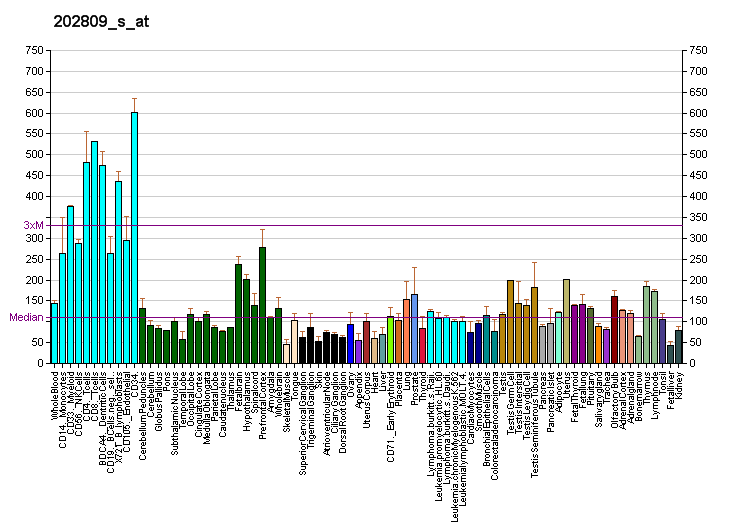
RNA expression pattern
| Bgee | Human / Mouse (ortholog); Top expressed in: right uterine tube; pituitary gland; right ovary; left ovary; anterior pituitary; canal of the cervix; body of uterus; right adrenal gland; right adrenal cortex; ascending aorta / Top expressed in: tail of embryo; Paneth cell; Ileal epithelium; genital tubercle; secondary oocyte; yolk sac; zygote; habenula; epiblast; primitive streak; More reference expression data |
| BioGPS | More reference expression data |
Gene ontology
| Molecular function | protein binding |
| Cellular component | integrator complex; SOSS complex; nucleus; nucleoplasm; nucleolus; cytoplasm |
| Biological process | response to ionizing radiation; DNA repair; snRNA processing; cellular response to DNA damage stimulus; mitotic cell cycle checkpoint signaling; snRNA transcription by RNA polymerase II |
Sources:Amigo / QuickGO
Orthologs
| Databases | NCBI: entry; OMA: entry |
| Species | Human | Mouse |
| Entrez | 65123 | 229543 |
| Ensembl | ENSG00000143624; ENSG00000262826 | ENSMUSG00000027933 |
| UniProt | Q68E01 | Q7TPD0 |
| RefSeq (mRNA) | NM_023015; NM_001324475 | NM_145540; NM_178876 |
| RefSeq (protein) | NP_001311404; NP_075391 | NP_663515; NP_849207 |
| Location (UCSC) | Chr 1: 153.73 – 153.77 Mb | Chr 3: 90.3 – 90.34 Mb |
| PubMed search |
- Wikidata
| View/Edit Human | View/Edit Mouse |

Integrator complex subunit 3 is a protein that in humans is encoded by the INTS3 gene.
