= VPS13D =

Protein-coding gene in humans

Identifiers
- Aliases: VPS13D, vacuolar protein sorting 13 homolog D, SCAR4
- External IDs: OMIM: 608877; MGI: 2448530; GeneCards: VPS13D

Gene location (Human)
Chr.	Chromosome 1 (human)
Band	1p36.22-p36.21	Start	12,230,030 bp
Band	1p36.22-p36.21	End	12,512,047 bp

Gene location (Mouse)
Chr.	Chromosome 4 (mouse)
Band	4|4 E1	Start	144,699,192 bp
Band	4|4 E1	End	144,921,575 bp
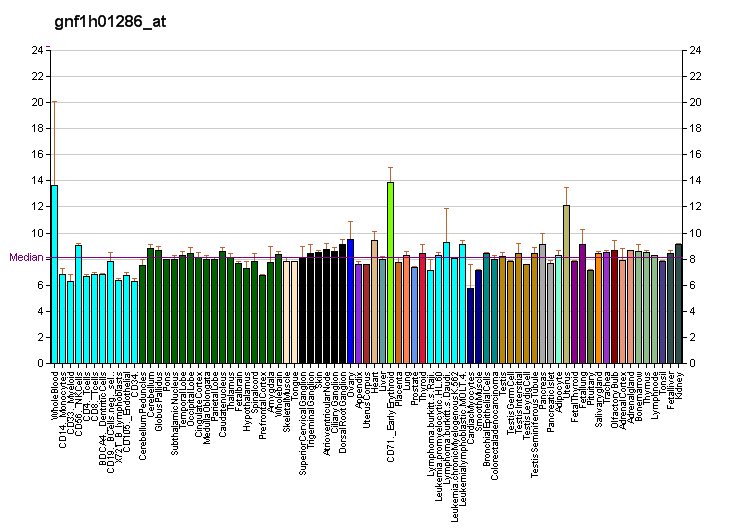

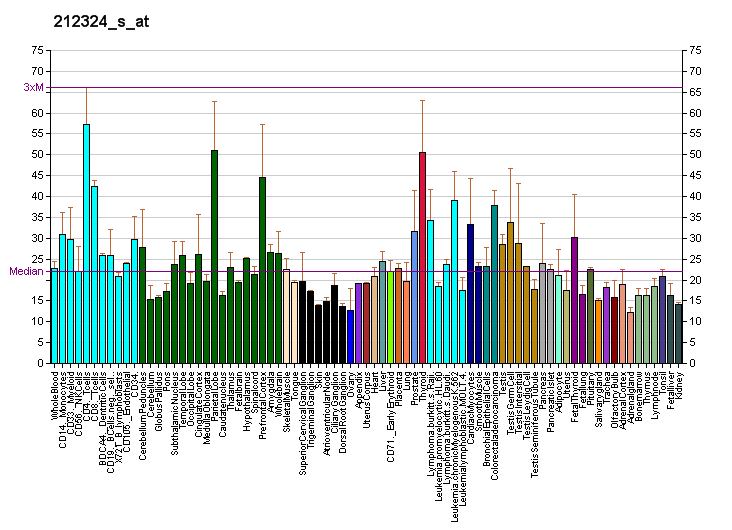

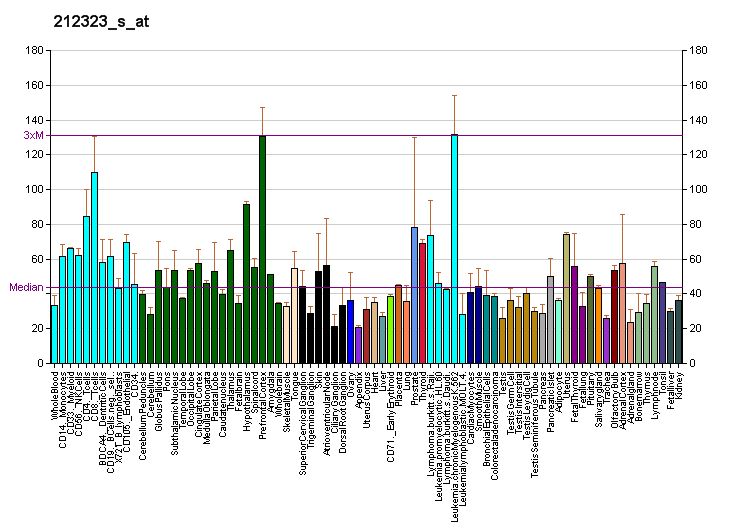
RNA expression pattern
Bgee	Human / Mouse (ortholog); Top expressed in: skin of leg; skin of abdomen; sural nerve; left ventricle; right lobe of thyroid gland; tibial arteries; left lobe of thyroid gland; apex of heart; canal of the cervix; tendon / Top expressed in: hand; granulocyte; otolith organ; utricle; neural layer of retina; muscle of thigh; esophagus; epithelium of small intestine; dentate gyrus of hippocampal formation granule cell; thymus; More reference expression data
BioGPS	More reference expression data
Orthologs
Databases	NCBI: entry; OMA: entry
Species	Human	Mouse
Entrez	55187	230895
Ensembl	ENSG00000048707	ENSMUSG00000020220
UniProt	Q5THJ4	n/a
RefSeq (mRNA)	NM_018156; NM_015378	NM_001033190; NM_001128198; NM_001276465; NM_001276502
RefSeq (protein)	NP_056193; NP_060626	n/a
Location (UCSC)	Chr 1: 12.23 – 12.51 Mb	Chr 4: 144.7 – 144.92 Mb
PubMed search
- Wikidata
View/Edit Human	View/Edit Mouse

Vacuolar protein sorting-associated protein 13D is a protein that in humans is encoded by the VPS13D gene.

This gene encodes a protein belonging to the vacuolar-protein-sorting-13 gene family. In yeast, vacuolar-protein-sorting-13 proteins are involved in trafficking of membrane proteins between the trans-Golgi network and the prevacuolar compartment.

While several transcript variants may exist for this gene, the full-length natures of only two have been described to date. These two represent the major variants of this gene and encode distinct isoforms.
