= EDEM3 =

Protein-coding gene in humans

Identifiers
- Aliases: EDEM3, C1orf22, ER degradation enhancing alpha-mannosidase like protein 3, CDG2V
- External IDs: OMIM: 610214; MGI: 1914217; GeneCards: EDEM3
Enzyme activity
EC #	BRENDA	ExPASy	KEGG	MetaCyc
3.2.1.113	↗	↗	↗	↗

Gene location (Human)
Chr.	Chromosome 1 (human)
Band	1q25.3	Start	184,690,237 bp
Band	1q25.3	End	184,754,907 bp

Gene location (Mouse)
Chr.	Chromosome 1 (mouse)
Band	1|1 G2	Start	151,631,122 bp
Band	1|1 G2	End	151,697,802 bp
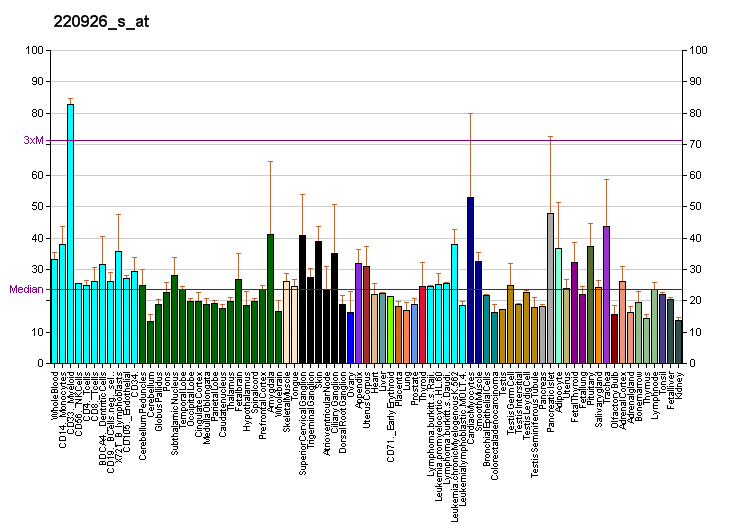

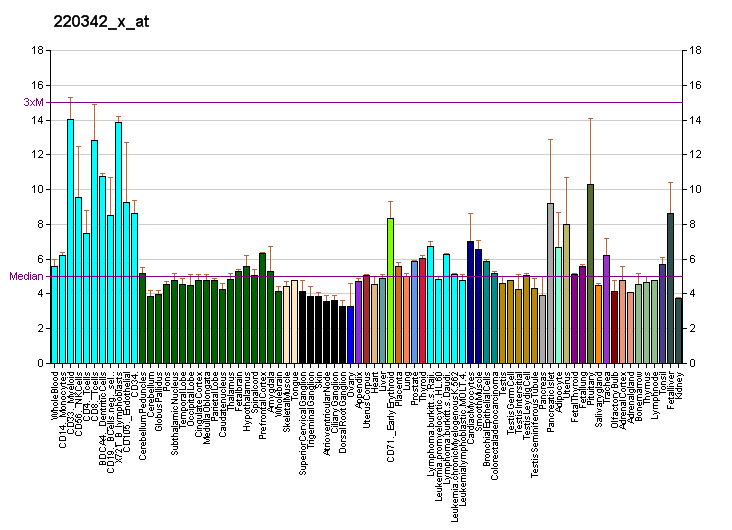
RNA expression pattern
Bgee	Human / Mouse (ortholog); Top expressed in: pylorus; mucosa of sigmoid colon; jejunal mucosa; mucosa of paranasal sinus; trabecular bone; islet of Langerhans; stromal cell of endometrium; cardia; body of pancreas; rectum / Top expressed in: lacrimal gland; seminal vesicula; salivary gland; parotid gland; submandibular gland; cumulus cell; left lung lobe; pineal gland; epithelium of stomach; crypt of lieberkuhn of small intestine; More reference expression data
BioGPS	More reference expression data
Gene ontology
Molecular function	calcium ion binding; hydrolase activity; metal ion binding; mannosyl-oligosaccharide 1,2-alpha-mannosidase activity; catalytic activity
Cellular component	endoplasmic reticulum lumen; endoplasmic reticulum; membrane; endoplasmic reticulum quality control compartment
Biological process	endoplasmic reticulum unfolded protein response; protein glycosylation; N-glycan processing; response to unfolded protein; glycoprotein catabolic process; proteasome-mediated ubiquitin-dependent protein catabolic process; mannose trimming involved in glycoprotein ERAD pathway
Sources:Amigo / QuickGO
Orthologs
Databases	NCBI: entry; OMA: entry
Species	Human	Mouse
Entrez	80267	66967
Ensembl	ENSG00000116406	ENSMUSG00000043019
UniProt	Q9BZQ6	Q2HXL6
RefSeq (mRNA)	NM_025191; NM_001319960	NM_001039644; NM_001311165; NM_001311166
RefSeq (protein)	NP_001306889; NP_079467	NP_001034733; NP_001298094; NP_001298095
Location (UCSC)	Chr 1: 184.69 – 184.75 Mb	Chr 1: 151.63 – 151.7 Mb
PubMed search
- Wikidata
View/Edit Human	View/Edit Mouse

ER degradation-enhancing alpha-mannosidase-like 3 is an enzyme that in humans is encoded by the EDEM3 gene.
