= ZNF436 =

Protein-coding gene in humans

Identifiers
- Aliases: ZNF436, ZNF, Zfp46, zinc finger protein 436
- External IDs: OMIM: 611703; MGI: 99192; GeneCards: ZNF436

Gene location (Human)
Chr.	Chromosome 1 (human)
Band	1p36.12	Start	23,359,448 bp
Band	1p36.12	End	23,369,836 bp

Gene location (Mouse)
Chr.	Chromosome 4 (mouse)
Band	4 D3|4 68.34 cM	Start	136,011,994 bp
Band	4 D3|4 68.34 cM	End	136,021,253 bp
RNA expression pattern
Bgee	Human / Mouse (ortholog); Top expressed in: endometrium; Achilles tendon; corpus callosum; ganglionic eminence; right adrenal gland; smooth muscle tissue; mucosa of esophagus; left adrenal gland; gallbladder; ovary / Top expressed in: vas deferens; tunica media of zone of aorta; Rostral migratory stream; ciliary body; calvaria; efferent ductule; olfactory tubercle; iris; abdominal wall; tunica adventitia of aorta; More reference expression data
BioGPS	n/a
Gene ontology
Molecular function	DNA-binding transcription factor activity; DNA binding; protein binding; metal ion binding; nucleic acid binding; DNA-binding transcription factor activity, RNA polymerase II-specific
Cellular component	intracellular anatomical structure; nucleus; nucleoplasm; cytosol
Biological process	regulation of transcription, DNA-templated; transcription, DNA-templated; regulation of transcription by RNA polymerase II
Sources:Amigo / QuickGO
Orthologs
Databases	NCBI: entry; OMA: entry
Species	Human	Mouse
Entrez	80818	22704
Ensembl	ENSG00000125945; ENSG00000283009	ENSMUSG00000051351
UniProt	Q9C0F3	Q8BPP0
RefSeq (mRNA)	NM_001077195; NM_030634; NM_001370652	NM_009557; NM_001356308; NM_001370651
RefSeq (protein)	NP_001070663; NP_085137; NP_001357581	NP_033583; NP_001343237; NP_001357580
Location (UCSC)	Chr 1: 23.36 – 23.37 Mb	Chr 4: 136.01 – 136.02 Mb
PubMed search
- Wikidata
View/Edit Human	View/Edit Mouse

Zinc finger protein 436 is a protein that in humans is encoded by the ZNF436 gene.

== See also ==
- ZNF692
