= Zinc finger protein 692 =

Protein found in humans

ZNF692

Identifiers
- Aliases: ZNF692, AREBP, Zfp692, zinc finger protein 692
- External IDs: OMIM: 617758; MGI: 2144276; GeneCards: ZNF692
Available structures
PDB	Ortholog search: PDBe RCSB
PDB	List of PDB id codes 2D9H, 2DLK

Gene location (Human)
Chr.	Chromosome 1 (human)
Band	1q44	Start	248,850,006 bp
Band	1q44	End	248,859,144 bp

Gene location (Mouse)
Chr.	Chromosome 11 (mouse)
Band	11|11 B1.3	Start	58,197,895 bp
Band	11|11 B1.3	End	58,205,453 bp
RNA expression pattern
Bgee	Human / Mouse (ortholog); Top expressed in: right hemisphere of cerebellum; right uterine tube; right frontal lobe; left testis; anterior pituitary; right testis; right lobe of thyroid gland; apex of heart; canal of the cervix; body of pancreas / Top expressed in: neural layer of retina; hair follicle; gastrula; submandibular gland; medullary collecting duct; cerebellar cortex; esophagus; lip; otic vesicle; superior frontal gyrus; More reference expression data
BioGPS	n/a
Gene ontology
Molecular function	DNA binding; metal ion binding; nucleic acid binding; RNA polymerase II cis-regulatory region sequence-specific DNA binding; DNA-binding transcription repressor activity, RNA polymerase II-specific; DNA-binding transcription factor activity, RNA polymerase II-specific
Cellular component	nucleus; nucleolus
Biological process	regulation of transcription, DNA-templated; transcription, DNA-templated; negative regulation of transcription by RNA polymerase II
Sources:Amigo / QuickGO
Orthologs
Databases	NCBI: entry; OMA: entry
Species	Human	Mouse
Entrez	55657	103836
Ensembl	ENSG00000171163	ENSMUSG00000037243
UniProt	Q9BU19	Q3U381
RefSeq (mRNA)	NM_001136036; NM_001193328; NM_017865; NM_001350072; NM_001350073	NM_001040686; NM_182996
RefSeq (protein)	NP_001129508; NP_001180257; NP_060335; NP_001337001; NP_001337002	NP_001035776; NP_892041
Location (UCSC)	Chr 1: 248.85 – 248.86 Mb	Chr 11: 58.2 – 58.21 Mb
PubMed search
- Wikidata
View/Edit Human	View/Edit Mouse

Zinc finger protein 692 is a protein that in humans is encoded by the ZNF692 gene.
