= MAN1A2 =

Protein-coding gene in humans

Identifiers
- Aliases: MAN1A2, MAN1B, mannosidase alpha class 1A member 2
- External IDs: OMIM: 604345; MGI: 104676; GeneCards: MAN1A2
Enzyme activity
| EC # | BRENDA | ExPASy | KEGG | MetaCyc |
|---|---|---|---|---|
| 3.2.1.113 | ↗ | ↗ | ↗ | ↗ |

Gene location (Human)
| Chr. | Chromosome 1 (human) |
| Band | 1p12 | Start | 117,367,449 bp |
| Band | 1p12 | End | 117,528,872 bp |

Gene location (Mouse)
| Chr. | Chromosome 3 (mouse) |
| Band | 3|3 F2.2 | Start | 100,469,524 bp |
| Band | 3|3 F2.2 | End | 100,592,819 bp |
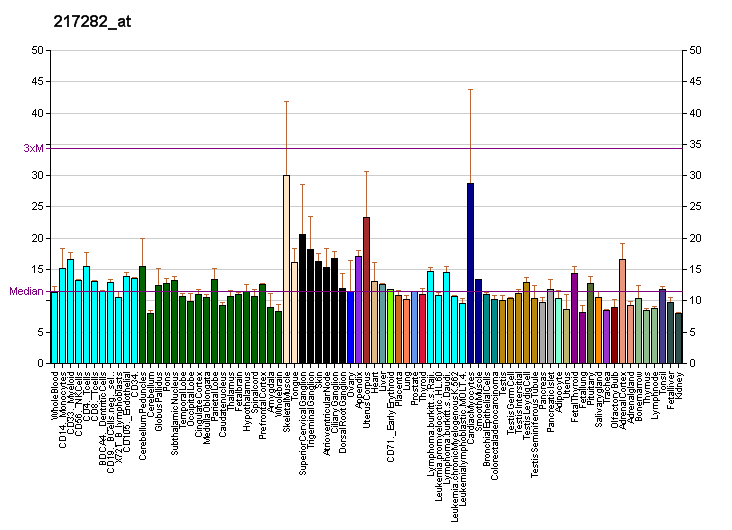
RNA expression pattern
| Bgee | Human / Mouse (ortholog); Top expressed in: middle temporal gyrus; endothelial cell; Epithelium of choroid plexus; Brodmann area 23; parietal pleura; epithelium of nasopharynx; visceral pleura; placenta; superficial temporal artery; skin of thigh / Top expressed in: genital tubercle; medial dorsal nucleus; tail of embryo; lateral geniculate nucleus; medial geniculate nucleus; molar; spermatocyte; anterior amygdaloid area; spermatid; lateral septal nucleus; More reference expression data |
| BioGPS | More reference expression data |
Gene ontology
| Molecular function | calcium ion binding; hydrolase activity; hydrolase activity, acting on glycosyl bonds; metal ion binding; mannosyl-oligosaccharide 1,2-alpha-mannosidase activity; catalytic activity |
| Cellular component | Golgi apparatus; extracellular exosome; endoplasmic reticulum; membrane; integral component of membrane; Golgi membrane |
| Biological process | protein glycosylation; N-glycan processing; lung alveolus development; metabolism; glycoprotein metabolic process; Golgi apparatus mannose trimming; respiratory gaseous exchange by respiratory system |
Sources:Amigo / QuickGO
Orthologs
| Databases | NCBI: entry; OMA: entry |
| Species | Human | Mouse |
| Entrez | 10905 | 17156 |
| Ensembl | ENSG00000198162 | ENSMUSG00000008763 |
| UniProt | O60476 | P39098 |
| RefSeq (mRNA) | NM_006699 | NM_010763 |
| RefSeq (protein) | NP_006690 | NP_034893 |
| Location (UCSC) | Chr 1: 117.37 – 117.53 Mb | Chr 3: 100.47 – 100.59 Mb |
| PubMed search |
- Wikidata
| View/Edit Human | View/Edit Mouse |

Mannosyl-oligosaccharide 1,2-alpha-mannosidase IB is an enzyme that in humans is encoded by the MAN1A2 gene.
