= GON4L =

Protein-coding gene in humans

Identifiers
- Aliases: GON4L, GON-4, GON4, YARP, gon-4 like
- External IDs: OMIM: 610393; MGI: 1917579; GeneCards: GON4L
Available structures
PDB	Ortholog search: PDBe RCSB
PDB	List of PDB id codes 1UG2

Gene location (Human)
Chr.	Chromosome 1 (human)
Band	1q22	Start	155,749,659 bp
Band	1q22	End	155,859,400 bp

Gene location (Mouse)
Chr.	Chromosome 3 (mouse)
Band	3|3 F1	Start	88,835,231 bp
Band	3|3 F1	End	88,910,103 bp
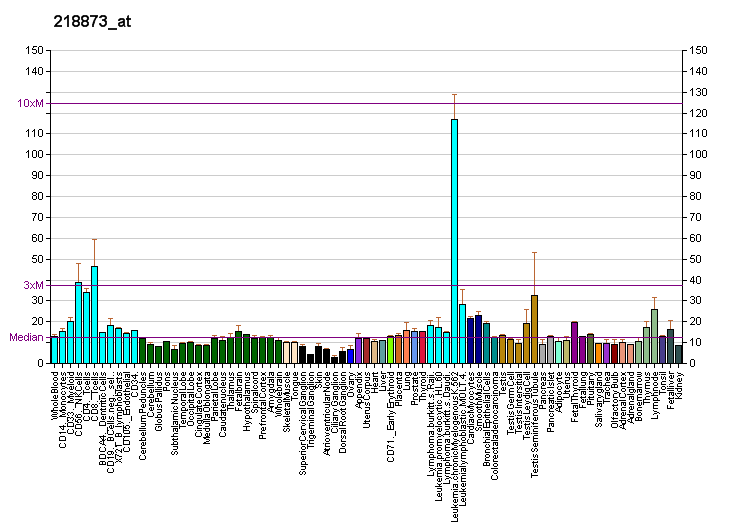
RNA expression pattern
Bgee	Human / Mouse (ortholog); Top expressed in: sural nerve; granulocyte; epithelium of colon; buccal mucosa cell; Achilles tendon; right uterine tube; apex of heart; anterior pituitary; gastric mucosa; right lobe of thyroid gland / Top expressed in: saccule; zygote; otic vesicle; primary oocyte; otic placode; spermatocyte; secondary oocyte; neural layer of retina; tail of embryo; ventricular zone; More reference expression data
BioGPS	More reference expression data
Gene ontology
Molecular function	DNA binding; transcription corepressor activity; DNA-binding transcription factor activity, RNA polymerase II-specific
Cellular component	nucleoplasm; nuclear body; nucleus
Biological process	transcription, DNA-templated; regulation of transcription, DNA-templated; B cell differentiation; negative regulation of transcription, DNA-templated; regulation of transcription by RNA polymerase II
Sources:Amigo / QuickGO
Orthologs
Databases	NCBI: entry; OMA: entry
Species	Human	Mouse
Entrez	54856	76022
Ensembl	ENSG00000116580	ENSMUSG00000054199
UniProt	Q3T8J9	Q9DB00
RefSeq (mRNA)	NM_001037533; NM_001282856; NM_001282858; NM_001282860; NM_001282861 NM_032292; NM_025174	NM_001242372; NM_027389
RefSeq (protein)	NP_001269785; NP_001269787; NP_001269789; NP_001269790; NP_115668	NP_001229301; NP_081665
Location (UCSC)	Chr 1: 155.75 – 155.86 Mb	Chr 3: 88.84 – 88.91 Mb
PubMed search
- Wikidata
View/Edit Human	View/Edit Mouse

GON-4-like protein is a protein that in humans is encoded by the GON4L gene. It is a nuclear protein containing two serine phosphosites and a lysine-glutamine cross-link and is thought to be a transcription factor.
