= TINAGL1 =

Protein-coding gene in humans

Identifiers
- Aliases: TINAGL1, ARG1, LCN7, LIECG3, TINAGRP, tubulointerstitial nephritis antigen like 1
- External IDs: OMIM: 616064; MGI: 2137617; GeneCards: TINAGL1

Gene location (Human)
Chr.	Chromosome 1 (human)
Band	1p35.2	Start	31,576,485 bp
Band	1p35.2	End	31,587,686 bp

Gene location (Mouse)
Chr.	Chromosome 4 (mouse)
Band	4|4 D2.2	Start	130,058,247 bp
Band	4|4 D2.2	End	130,068,915 bp
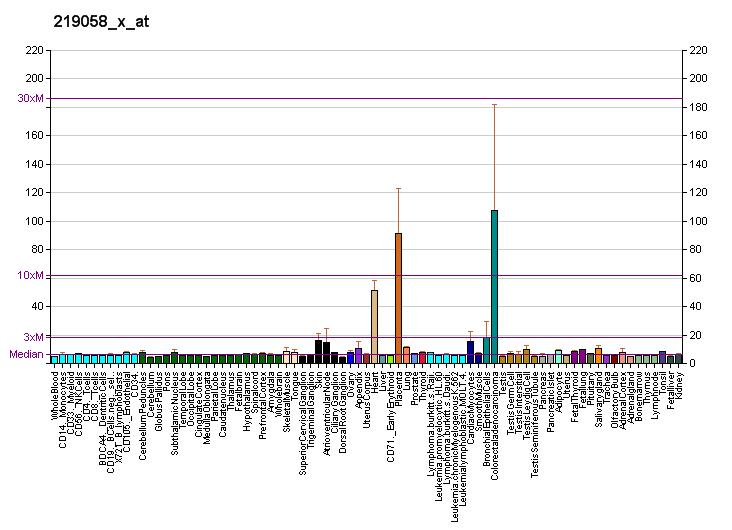
RNA expression pattern
Bgee	Human / Mouse (ortholog); Top expressed in: right coronary artery; ascending aorta; popliteal artery; tibial arteries; Descending thoracic aorta; apex of heart; left coronary artery; right lobe of thyroid gland; left lobe of thyroid gland; left uterine tube / Top expressed in: granulocyte; ascending aorta; decidua; yolk sac; external carotid artery; umbilical cord; endothelial cell of lymphatic vessel; pyloric antrum; aortic valve; tunica media of zone of aorta; More reference expression data
BioGPS	More reference expression data
Gene ontology
Molecular function	scavenger receptor activity; polysaccharide binding; cysteine-type endopeptidase activity; laminin binding; extracellular matrix structural constituent; protein binding; cysteine-type peptidase activity
Cellular component	cytoplasm; extracellular matrix; extracellular region; lysosome; extracellular exosome; extracellular space; collagen-containing extracellular matrix
Biological process	endosomal transport; cell adhesion; proteolysis involved in cellular protein catabolic process; receptor-mediated endocytosis; immune response; proteolysis; endocytosis
Sources:Amigo / QuickGO
Orthologs
Databases	NCBI: entry; OMA: entry
Species	Human	Mouse
Entrez	64129	94242
Ensembl	ENSG00000142910	ENSMUSG00000028776
UniProt	Q9GZM7	Q99JR5
RefSeq (mRNA)	NM_001204414; NM_001204415; NM_022164	NM_001168333; NM_023476
RefSeq (protein)	NP_001191343; NP_001191344; NP_071447	NP_001161805; NP_075965
Location (UCSC)	Chr 1: 31.58 – 31.59 Mb	Chr 4: 130.06 – 130.07 Mb
PubMed search
- Wikidata
View/Edit Human	View/Edit Mouse

Tubulointerstitial nephritis antigen-like is a protein that in humans is encoded by the TINAGL1 gene.
