= CSDE1 =

Protein-coding gene in humans

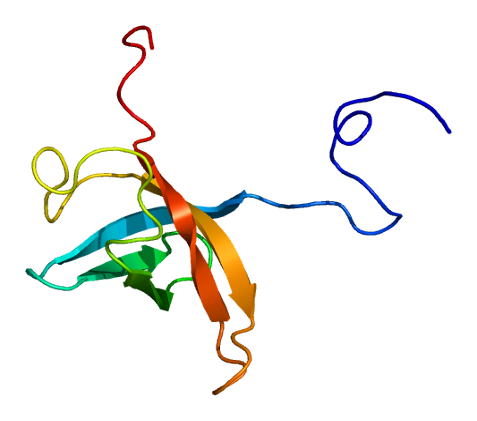

Identifiers
- Aliases: CSDE1, D1S155E, UNR, cold shock domain containing E1
- External IDs: OMIM: 191510; MGI: 92356; GeneCards: CSDE1
Available structures
PDB	Ortholog search: PDBe RCSB
PDB	List of PDB id codes 1WFQ, 1X65, 2YTV, 2YTX, 2YTY

Gene location (Human)
Chr.	Chromosome 1 (human)
Band	1p13.2	Start	114,716,913 bp
Band	1p13.2	End	114,758,676 bp

Gene location (Mouse)
Chr.	Chromosome 3 (mouse)
Band	3 F2.2|3 45.25 cM	Start	102,927,742 bp
Band	3 F2.2|3 45.25 cM	End	102,965,502 bp
RNA expression pattern
Bgee	Human / Mouse (ortholog); Top expressed in: Achilles tendon; Skeletal muscle tissue of rectus abdominis; glutes; gastrocnemius muscle; epithelium of colon; Skeletal muscle tissue of biceps brachii; muscle of thigh; triceps brachii muscle; deltoid muscle; vastus lateralis muscle / Top expressed in: Rostral migratory stream; vestibular membrane of cochlear duct; lacrimal gland; primitive streak; abdominal wall; triceps brachii muscle; spermatid; ankle; vastus lateralis muscle; knee joint; More reference expression data
BioGPS	n/a
Gene ontology
Molecular function	DNA binding; protein binding; nucleic acid binding; RNA binding
Cellular component	CRD-mediated mRNA stability complex; mitochondrial inner membrane; plasma membrane; Golgi apparatus; cytoplasm; cytosol
Biological process	male gonad development; regulation of transcription, DNA-templated; nuclear-transcribed mRNA catabolic process, no-go decay
Sources:Amigo / QuickGO
Orthologs
Databases	NCBI: entry; OMA: entry
Species	Human	Mouse
Entrez	7812	229663
Ensembl	ENSG00000009307	ENSMUSG00000068823
UniProt	O75534	Q91W50
RefSeq (mRNA)	NM_007158; NM_001007553; NM_001130523; NM_001242891; NM_001242892 NM_001242893	NM_001161854; NM_144901; NM_001310693
RefSeq (protein)	NP_001007554; NP_001123995; NP_001229820; NP_001229821; NP_001229822 NP_009089	NP_001155326; NP_001297622; NP_659150
Location (UCSC)	Chr 1: 114.72 – 114.76 Mb	Chr 3: 102.93 – 102.97 Mb
PubMed search
- Wikidata
View/Edit Human	View/Edit Mouse

Cold shock domain-containing protein E1 is a protein that in humans is encoded by the CSDE1 gene.
