= LRRC41 =

Protein-coding gene in humans

Identifiers
- Aliases: LRRC41, MUF1, PP7759, leucine rich repeat containing 41
- External IDs: MGI: 2441984; GeneCards: LRRC41

Gene location (Human)
Chr.	Chromosome 1 (human)
Band	1p34.1-p33	Start	46,261,196 bp
Band	1p34.1-p33	End	46,303,616 bp

Gene location (Mouse)
Chr.	Chromosome 4 (mouse)
Band	4|4 D1	Start	115,932,466 bp
Band	4|4 D1	End	115,954,240 bp
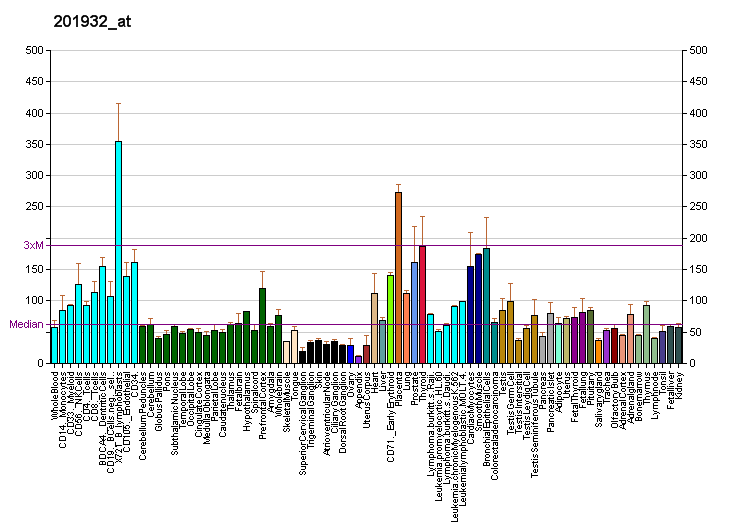
RNA expression pattern
Bgee	Human / Mouse (ortholog); Top expressed in: right uterine tube; anterior pituitary; left uterine tube; stromal cell of endometrium; right ovary; body of uterus; left ovary; canal of the cervix; right adrenal cortex; ectocervix / Top expressed in: spermatocyte; spermatid; yolk sac; seminiferous tubule; seminal vesicula; right kidney; external carotid artery; epithelium of small intestine; internal carotid artery; molar; More reference expression data
BioGPS	More reference expression data
Gene ontology
Molecular function	protein homodimerization activity
Cellular component	membrane; nucleus; cytoplasm; cytosol
Biological process	protein ubiquitination; post-translational protein modification
Sources:Amigo / QuickGO
Orthologs
Databases	NCBI: entry; OMA: entry
Species	Human	Mouse
Entrez	10489	230654
Ensembl	ENSG00000132128	ENSMUSG00000028703
UniProt	Q15345	Q8K1C9
RefSeq (mRNA)	NM_006369	NM_153521
RefSeq (protein)	NP_006360	NP_705741
Location (UCSC)	Chr 1: 46.26 – 46.3 Mb	Chr 4: 115.93 – 115.95 Mb
PubMed search
- Wikidata
View/Edit Human	View/Edit Mouse

Leucine-rich repeat-containing protein 41 is a protein that in humans is encoded by the LRRC41 gene.
