= Ring finger protein 19B =

Protein found in humans

RNF19B

Identifiers
- Aliases: RNF19B, IBRDC3, NKLAM, ring finger protein 19B
- External IDs: OMIM: 610872; MGI: 1922484; GeneCards: RNF19B
Enzyme activity
EC #	BRENDA	ExPASy	KEGG	MetaCyc
2.3.2.31	↗	↗	↗	↗

Gene location (Human)
Chr.	Chromosome 1 (human)
Band	1p35.1	Start	32,936,445 bp
Band	1p35.1	End	32,964,809 bp

Gene location (Mouse)
Chr.	Chromosome 4 (mouse)
Band	4|4 D2.2	Start	128,952,064 bp
Band	4|4 D2.2	End	128,979,679 bp
RNA expression pattern
Bgee	Human / Mouse (ortholog); Top expressed in: left testis; right testis; beta cell; monocyte; mucosa of ileum; blood; granulocyte; rectum; nasal epithelium; mucosa of esophagus / Top expressed in: seminiferous tubule; spermatid; spermatocyte; granulocyte; saccule; otic placode; cerebellar cortex; zygote; cerebellar vermis; otic vesicle; More reference expression data
BioGPS	n/a
Gene ontology
Molecular function	protein binding; metal ion binding; ubiquitin protein ligase activity; ubiquitin conjugating enzyme binding; ubiquitin-protein transferase activity; transferase activity; ubiquitin binding
Cellular component	membrane; cytolytic granule; ubiquitin ligase complex; integral component of membrane; cytosol; endoplasmic reticulum; endoplasmic reticulum membrane; cytoplasm
Biological process	positive regulation of proteasomal ubiquitin-dependent protein catabolic process; adaptive immune response; immune system process; protein ubiquitination; protein polyubiquitination; ubiquitin-dependent protein catabolic process; protein autoubiquitination
Sources:Amigo / QuickGO
Orthologs
Databases	NCBI: entry; OMA: entry
Species	Human	Mouse
Entrez	127544	75234
Ensembl	ENSG00000116514	ENSMUSG00000028793
UniProt	Q6ZMZ0	A2A7Q9
RefSeq (mRNA)	NM_001127361; NM_001300826; NM_153341	NM_029219; NM_001368763
RefSeq (protein)	NP_001120833; NP_001287755; NP_699172	NP_083495; NP_001355692
Location (UCSC)	Chr 1: 32.94 – 32.96 Mb	Chr 4: 128.95 – 128.98 Mb
PubMed search
- Wikidata
View/Edit Human	View/Edit Mouse

Ring finger protein 19B is a protein that in humans is encoded by the RNF19B gene.

== Function ==
This gene encodes a multi-pass membrane protein containing two RING-type and one IBR-type zinc finger motifs. The encoded protein is an E3 ubiquitin-protein ligase that plays a role in the cytotoxic effects of natural killer (NK) cells. Alternative splicing results in multiple transcript variants. There are pseudogenes for this gene on chromosomes X and Y in a possible pseudoautosomal region.
