= Deoxyribonuclease 2 beta =

Protein found in humans

DNASE2B

Identifiers
- Aliases: DNASE2B, DLAD, deoxyribonuclease II beta, deoxyribonuclease 2 beta
- External IDs: OMIM: 608057; MGI: 1913283; GeneCards: DNASE2B
Enzyme activity
EC #	BRENDA	ExPASy	KEGG	MetaCyc
3.1.22.1	↗	↗	↗	↗

Gene location (Human)
Chr.	Chromosome 1 (human)
Band	1p31.1-p22.3	Start	84,398,484 bp
Band	1p31.1-p22.3	End	84,415,018 bp

Gene location (Mouse)
Chr.	Chromosome 3 (mouse)
Band	3|3 H2	Start	146,286,740 bp
Band	3|3 H2	End	146,321,351 bp
RNA expression pattern
Bgee	Human / Mouse (ortholog); Top expressed in: parotid gland; testicle; minor salivary glands; gastrocnemius muscle; right lung; mucosa of transverse colon; upper lobe of left lung; muscle of thigh; prostate; nucleus accumbens / Top expressed in: seminal vesicula; epithelium of lens; left lobe of liver; glossopharyngeal ganglion; basal plate; greater petrosal nerve; sternocleidomastoid muscle; temporal muscle; spinal ganglia; iris; More reference expression data
BioGPS	n/a
Gene ontology
Molecular function	deoxyribonuclease II activity; nuclease activity; endonuclease activity; endodeoxyribonuclease activity; hydrolase activity
Cellular component	cytoplasm; extracellular region; lysosome; intracellular anatomical structure
Biological process	DNA metabolic process; apoptotic DNA fragmentation
Sources:Amigo / QuickGO
Orthologs
Databases	NCBI: entry; OMA: entry
Species	Human	Mouse
Entrez	58511	56629
Ensembl	ENSG00000137976	ENSMUSG00000028185
UniProt	Q8WZ79; Q66K39	Q9QY48
RefSeq (mRNA)	NM_021233; NM_058248	NM_019957
RefSeq (protein)	NP_067056; NP_490649; NP_067056.2	NP_064341
Location (UCSC)	Chr 1: 84.4 – 84.42 Mb	Chr 3: 146.29 – 146.32 Mb
PubMed search
- Wikidata
View/Edit Human	View/Edit Mouse

Deoxyribonuclease 2 beta is a protein that in humans is encoded by the DNASE2B gene.

== Function ==
The protein encoded by this gene shares considerable sequence similarity to, and is structurally related to DNase II. The latter is a well characterized endonuclease that catalyzes DNA hydrolysis in the absence of divalent cations at acidic pH. Unlike DNase II which is ubiquitously expressed, expression of this gene product is restricted to the salivary gland and lungs. The gene has been localized to chromosome 1p22.3 adjacent (and in opposite orientation) to the uricase pseudogene. Two transcript variants encoding different isoforms have been described for this gene. [provided by RefSeq, Jul 2008].
