= Guanylate cyclase activator 2B =

Protein found in humans

GUCA2B

Identifiers
- Aliases: GUCA2B, GCAP-II, UGN, guanylate cyclase activator 2B
- External IDs: OMIM: 601271; MGI: 1270851; GeneCards: GUCA2B
Available structures
PDB	Ortholog search: PDBe RCSB
PDB	List of PDB id codes 1UYA, 1UYB

Gene location (Human)
Chr.	Chromosome 1 (human)
Band	1p34.2	Start	42,153,410 bp
Band	1p34.2	End	42,155,820 bp

Gene location (Mouse)
Chr.	Chromosome 4 (mouse)
Band	4 D2.1|4 55.48 cM	Start	119,513,804 bp
Band	4 D2.1|4 55.48 cM	End	119,516,151 bp
RNA expression pattern
Bgee	Human / Mouse (ortholog); Top expressed in: mucosa of ileum; mucosa of transverse colon; mucosa of sigmoid colon; jejunal mucosa; duodenum; rectum; testicle; right lobe of liver; body of stomach; epithelium of colon / Top expressed in: right kidney; crypt of lieberkuhn of small intestine; duodenum; ileum; human kidney; jejunum; proximal tubule; epithelium of small intestine; intestinal villus; migratory enteric neural crest cell; More reference expression data
BioGPS	n/a
Gene ontology
Molecular function	guanylate cyclase activator activity; calcium sensitive guanylate cyclase activator activity
Cellular component	photoreceptor outer segment; extracellular exosome; extracellular region
Biological process	cGMP biosynthetic process; excretion; body fluid secretion; negative regulation of blood pressure; positive regulation of guanylate cyclase activity; digestion; cGMP-mediated signaling
Sources:Amigo / QuickGO
Orthologs
Databases	NCBI: entry; OMA: entry
Species	Human	Mouse
Entrez	2981	14916
Ensembl	ENSG00000044012	ENSMUSG00000032978
UniProt	Q16661	O09051
RefSeq (mRNA)	NM_007102	NM_008191
RefSeq (protein)	NP_009033	NP_032217
Location (UCSC)	Chr 1: 42.15 – 42.16 Mb	Chr 4: 119.51 – 119.52 Mb
PubMed search
- Wikidata
View/Edit Human	View/Edit Mouse

Guanylate cyclase activator 2B is a protein that in humans is encoded by the GUCA2B gene.

== Function ==
This gene encodes a preproprotein that is proteolytically processed to generate multiple protein products, including uroguanylin, a member of the guanylin family of peptides and an endogenous ligand of the guanylate cyclase-C receptor. Binding of this peptide to its cognate receptor stimulates an increase in cyclic GMP and may regulate salt and water homeostasis in the intestine and kidneys.
