= TM2 domain containing 1 =

Protein found in humans

TM2D1

Identifiers
- Aliases: TM2D1, BBP, TM2 domain containing 1
- External IDs: OMIM: 610080; MGI: 2137022; GeneCards: TM2D1

Gene location (Human)
Chr.	Chromosome 1 (human)
Band	1p31.3	Start	61,681,046 bp
Band	1p31.3	End	61,725,423 bp

Gene location (Mouse)
Chr.	Chromosome 4 (mouse)
Band	4|4 C6	Start	98,243,607 bp
Band	4|4 C6	End	98,271,543 bp
RNA expression pattern
Bgee	Human / Mouse (ortholog); Top expressed in: endothelial cell; Achilles tendon; Epithelium of choroid plexus; germinal epithelium; oocyte; Descending thoracic aorta; parotid gland; mucosa of paranasal sinus; ascending aorta; corpus epididymis / Top expressed in: proximal tubule; right kidney; quadriceps femoris muscle; neural tube; yolk sac; skeletal muscle tissue; spermatid; stomach; mesencephalon; heart; More reference expression data
BioGPS	n/a
Gene ontology
Molecular function	amyloid-beta binding; G protein-coupled receptor activity
Cellular component	integral component of plasma membrane; membrane; integral component of membrane; nucleoplasm
Biological process	apoptotic process; apoptotic signaling pathway; G protein-coupled receptor signaling pathway
Sources:Amigo / QuickGO
Orthologs
Databases	NCBI: entry; OMA: entry
Species	Human	Mouse
Entrez	83941	94043
Ensembl	ENSG00000162604	ENSMUSG00000028563
UniProt	Q9BX74	Q99MB3
RefSeq (mRNA)	NM_032027	NM_053157
RefSeq (protein)	NP_114416	NP_444387
Location (UCSC)	Chr 1: 61.68 – 61.73 Mb	Chr 4: 98.24 – 98.27 Mb
PubMed search
- Wikidata
View/Edit Human	View/Edit Mouse

TM2 domain containing 1 is a protein that in humans is encoded by the TM2D1 gene.

== Function ==
The protein encoded by this gene is a beta-amyloid peptide-binding protein. It contains a structural module related to that of the seven transmembrane domain G protein-coupled receptor superfamily and known to be important in heterotrimeric G protein activation. Beta-amyloid peptide has been established to be a causative factor in neuron death and the consequent diminution of cognitive abilities observed in Alzheimer's disease. This protein may be a target of neurotoxic beta-amyloid peptide, and may mediate cellular vulnerability to beta-amyloid peptide toxicity through a G protein-regulated program of cell death. Several transcript variants have been found for this gene.
