= Hydroxyacid oxidase 2 =

Protein found in humans

HAO2

Identifiers
- Aliases: HAO2, GIG16, HAOX2, hydroxyacid oxidase 2
- External IDs: OMIM: 605176; MGI: 96012; GeneCards: HAO2
Enzyme activity
EC #	BRENDA	ExPASy	KEGG	MetaCyc
1.1.3.15	↗	↗	↗	↗

Gene location (Human)
Chr.	Chromosome 1 (human)
Band	1p12	Start	119,368,779 bp
Band	1p12	End	119,394,130 bp

Gene location (Mouse)
Chr.	Chromosome 3 (mouse)
Band	3 F2.2|3 42.9 cM	Start	98,781,837 bp
Band	3 F2.2|3 42.9 cM	End	98,800,555 bp
RNA expression pattern
Bgee	Human / Mouse (ortholog); Top expressed in: right lobe of liver; kidney tubule; glomerulus; metanephric glomerulus; human kidney; testicle; renal medulla; skin of thigh; skin of arm; vulva / Top expressed in: left colon; adrenal gland; proximal tubule; human kidney; right kidney; Gonadal ridge; migratory enteric neural crest cell; adrenal medulla; epithelium of small intestine; ileum; More reference expression data
BioGPS	n/a
Gene ontology
Molecular function	(S)-2-hydroxy-acid oxidase activity; oxidoreductase activity; FMN binding; signaling receptor binding; catalytic activity
Cellular component	peroxisome; peroxisomal matrix; cytosol
Biological process	fatty acid oxidation; fatty acid catabolic process; protein targeting to peroxisome
Sources:Amigo / QuickGO
Orthologs
Databases	NCBI: entry; OMA: entry
Species	Human	Mouse
Entrez	51179	56185
Ensembl	ENSG00000116882	ENSMUSG00000027870
UniProt	Q9NYQ3	Q9NYQ2
RefSeq (mRNA)	NM_001005783; NM_016527	NM_019545
RefSeq (protein)	NP_001005783; NP_057611; NP_001364401	NP_062418
Location (UCSC)	Chr 1: 119.37 – 119.39 Mb	Chr 3: 98.78 – 98.8 Mb
PubMed search
- Wikidata
View/Edit Human	View/Edit Mouse

Hydroxyacid oxidase 2 is a protein that in humans is encoded by the HAO2 gene.

== Function ==
This gene is one of three related genes that have 2-hydroxyacid oxidase activity. The encoded protein localizes to the peroxisome has the highest activity toward the substrate 2-hydroxypalmitate. Alternative splicing results in multiple transcript variants.
