= Dispatched RND transporter family member 3 =

Protein found in humans

DISP3

Identifiers
- Aliases: DISP3, PTCHD2, dispatched RND transporter family member 3
- External IDs: OMIM: 611251; MGI: 2444403; GeneCards: DISP3

Gene location (Human)
Chr.	Chromosome 1 (human)
Band	1p36.22	Start	11,479,155 bp
Band	1p36.22	End	11,537,551 bp

Gene location (Mouse)
Chr.	Chromosome 4 (mouse)
Band	4|4 E2	Start	148,324,721 bp
Band	4|4 E2	End	148,372,422 bp
RNA expression pattern
Bgee	Human / Mouse (ortholog); Top expressed in: ganglionic eminence; testicle; putamen; caudate nucleus; ventricular zone; right frontal lobe; nucleus accumbens; Brodmann area 9; primary visual cortex; amygdala / Top expressed in: primary visual cortex; ventromedial nucleus; superior frontal gyrus; cerebellar cortex; dentate gyrus of hippocampal formation granule cell; piriform cortex; neural tube; hippocampus proper; superior colliculus; ventricular zone; More reference expression data
BioGPS	n/a
Gene ontology
Molecular function	molecular function
Cellular component	membrane; cytoplasm; integral component of membrane; endoplasmic reticulum; nuclear membrane; nucleus; cytoplasmic vesicle; cytoplasmic vesicle membrane; endoplasmic reticulum membrane
Biological process	cholesterol homeostasis; positive regulation of neural precursor cell proliferation; positive regulation of lipid metabolic process; regulation of lipid transport; negative regulation of neuron differentiation; smoothened signaling pathway; cholesterol metabolic process; steroid metabolic process; cell differentiation; lipid metabolism
Sources:Amigo / QuickGO
Orthologs
Databases	NCBI: entry; OMA: entry
Species	Human	Mouse
Entrez	57540	242748
Ensembl	ENSG00000204624	ENSMUSG00000041544
UniProt	Q9P2K9	A3KFU9
RefSeq (mRNA)	NM_020780	NM_001083342
RefSeq (protein)	NP_065831	NP_001076811
Location (UCSC)	Chr 1: 11.48 – 11.54 Mb	Chr 4: 148.32 – 148.37 Mb
PubMed search
- Wikidata
View/Edit Human	View/Edit Mouse

Dispatched RND transporter family member 3 is a protein that in humans is encoded by the DISP3 gene.
