= ZFP69 zinc finger protein =

Protein in humans

ZFP69

Identifiers
- Aliases: ZFP69, ZFP69A, ZKSCAN23A, ZNF642, ZSCAN54A, ZFP69 zinc finger protein
- External IDs: OMIM: 617939; MGI: 107794; GeneCards: ZFP69

Gene location (Human)
Chr.	Chromosome 1 (human)
Band	1p34.2	Start	40,477,290 bp
Band	1p34.2	End	40,496,343 bp

Gene location (Mouse)
Chr.	Chromosome 4 (mouse)
Band	4 D2.2|4 56.66 cM	Start	120,787,334 bp
Band	4 D2.2|4 56.66 cM	End	120,808,896 bp
RNA expression pattern
Bgee	Human / Mouse (ortholog); Top expressed in: gonad; testicle; ganglionic eminence; oocyte; ventricular zone; granulocyte; C1 segment; Achilles tendon; monocyte; smooth muscle tissue / Top expressed in: ovarian follicle; secondary follicle of ovary; zygote; secondary oocyte; ovarian follicle cell; corpus luteum; genital tubercle; tail of embryo; primary oocyte; embryo; More reference expression data
BioGPS	n/a
Gene ontology
Molecular function	DNA binding; metal ion binding; nucleic acid binding; DNA-binding transcription factor activity, RNA polymerase II-specific
Cellular component	intracellular anatomical structure; nucleus
Biological process	regulation of transcription, DNA-templated; transcription, DNA-templated; regulation of transcription by RNA polymerase II; regulation of lipid metabolic process; lipid metabolism
Sources:Amigo / QuickGO
Orthologs
Databases	NCBI: entry; OMA: entry
Species	Human	Mouse
Entrez	339559	381549
Ensembl	ENSG00000187815	ENSMUSG00000064141
UniProt	Q49AA0	A2A761
RefSeq (mRNA)	NM_198494; NM_001320178; NM_001320179	NM_001005788; NM_001384119
RefSeq (protein)	NP_001307107; NP_001307108; NP_940896	NP_001005788; NP_001371048
Location (UCSC)	Chr 1: 40.48 – 40.5 Mb	Chr 4: 120.79 – 120.81 Mb
PubMed search
- Wikidata
View/Edit Human	View/Edit Mouse

ZFP69 zinc finger protein is a protein that in humans is encoded by the ZFP69 gene.
