= GBP6 =

Protein found in humans

Identifiers
- Aliases: GBP6, guanylate binding protein family member 6
- External IDs: OMIM: 612467; MGI: 97072; GeneCards: GBP6

Gene location (Human)
Chr.	Chromosome 1 (human)
Band	1p22.2	Start	89,364,059 bp
Band	1p22.2	End	89,388,160 bp

Gene location (Mouse)
Chr.	Chromosome 5 (mouse)
Band	5 E5|5 50.68 cM	Start	105,263,633 bp
Band	5 E5|5 50.68 cM	End	105,287,452 bp
RNA expression pattern
Bgee	Human / Mouse (ortholog); Top expressed in: gingival epithelium; mucosa of pharynx; oral cavity; mucosa of esophagus; body of tongue; superior surface of tongue; epithelium of nasopharynx; tonsil; vulva; vagina / Top expressed in: thymus; spleen; lung; heart; pancreas; islet of Langerhans; jejunum; ileum; muscle tissue; ovary; More reference expression data
BioGPS	n/a
Gene ontology
Molecular function	nucleotide binding; GTP binding; GTPase activity
Cellular component	extracellular exosome; symbiont-containing vacuole membrane; cytoplasmic vesicle
Biological process	defense response to bacterium; immune response; cellular response to interferon-gamma; defense response to protozoan; defense response to Gram-positive bacterium
Sources:Amigo / QuickGO
Orthologs
Databases	NCBI: entry; OMA: entry
Species	Human	Mouse
Entrez	163351	17472
Ensembl	ENSG00000183347	ENSMUSG00000079363
UniProt	Q6ZN66	n/a
RefSeq (mRNA)	NM_198460; NM_001320257	NM_001256005; NM_008620; NM_001359079; NM_001359080; NM_001359081 NM_001359082
RefSeq (protein)	NP_001307186; NP_940862	n/a
Location (UCSC)	Chr 1: 89.36 – 89.39 Mb	Chr 5: 105.26 – 105.29 Mb
PubMed search
- Wikidata
View/Edit Human	View/Edit Mouse

Guanylate binding protein family member 6 is a protein that in humans is encoded by the GBP6 gene.

== Function ==
Guanylate-binding proteins, such as GBP6, are induced by interferon and hydrolyze GTP to both GDP and GMP (Olszewski et al., 2006 [PubMed 16689661]).
