= G0S2 =

Protein-coding gene in humans

Identifiers
- Aliases: G0S2, G0/G1 switch 2
- External IDs: OMIM: 614447; MGI: 1316737; GeneCards: G0S2

Gene location (Human)
| Chr. | Chromosome 1 (human) |
| Band | 1q32.2 | Start | 209,675,412 bp |
| Band | 1q32.2 | End | 209,676,390 bp |

Gene location (Mouse)
| Chr. | Chromosome 1 (mouse) |
| Band | 1 H6|1 97.69 cM | Start | 192,954,469 bp |
| Band | 1 H6|1 97.69 cM | End | 192,955,525 bp |
RNA expression pattern
| Bgee | Human / Mouse (ortholog); Top expressed in: vena cava; periodontal fiber; synovial joint; Skeletal muscle tissue of biceps brachii; adipose tissue; pericardium; abdominal fat; subcutaneous adipose tissue; cartilage tissue; apex of heart / Top expressed in: granulocyte; brown adipose tissue; lacrimal gland; intercostal muscle; submandibular gland; white adipose tissue; parotid gland; tunica adventitia of aorta; lactiferous gland; left lobe of liver; More reference expression data |
| BioGPS | n/a |
Gene ontology
| Molecular function | protein binding; molecular function |
| Cellular component | lipid droplet; mitochondrion |
| Biological process | positive regulation of extrinsic apoptotic signaling pathway; extrinsic apoptotic signaling pathway; apoptotic process; regulation of lipid metabolic process; positive regulation of cold-induced thermogenesis |
Sources:Amigo / QuickGO
Orthologs
| Databases | NCBI: entry; OMA: entry |
| Species | Human | Mouse |
| Entrez | 50486 | 14373 |
| Ensembl | ENSG00000123689 | ENSMUSG00000009633 |
| UniProt | P27469 | Q61585 |
| RefSeq (mRNA) | NM_015714 | NM_008059 |
| RefSeq (protein) | NP_056529 | NP_032085 |
| Location (UCSC) | Chr 1: 209.68 – 209.68 Mb | Chr 1: 192.95 – 192.96 Mb |
| PubMed search |
- Wikidata
| View/Edit Human | View/Edit Mouse |

G0/G1 switch 2 is a protein that in humans is encoded by the G0S2 gene.
