= ZNF687 =

Protein-coding gene in humans

Identifiers
- Aliases: ZNF687, PDB6, zinc finger protein 687
- External IDs: OMIM: 610568; MGI: 1925516; GeneCards: ZNF687

Gene location (Human)
Chr.	Chromosome 1 (human)
Band	1q21.3	Start	151,281,618 bp
Band	1q21.3	End	151,292,176 bp

Gene location (Mouse)
Chr.	Chromosome 3 (mouse)
Band	3|3 F2.1	Start	95,006,590 bp
Band	3|3 F2.1	End	95,015,448 bp
RNA expression pattern
Bgee	Human / Mouse (ortholog); Top expressed in: cardiac muscle tissue of right atrium; myocardium of left ventricle; cardia; granulocyte; ventricular zone; bone marrow cell; ventral tegmental area; blood; nipple; subthalamic nucleus / Top expressed in: interventricular septum; zygote; tail of embryo; yolk sac; epiblast; hand; cerebellar vermis; granulocyte; lobe of cerebellum; ventricular zone; More reference expression data
BioGPS	n/a
Gene ontology
Molecular function	metal ion binding; DNA binding; protein binding; nucleic acid binding; DNA-binding transcription factor activity, RNA polymerase II-specific
Cellular component	nucleus; cytoplasm; nucleoplasm; cytosol
Biological process	regulation of transcription, DNA-templated; transcription, DNA-templated; regulation of transcription by RNA polymerase II
Sources:Amigo / QuickGO
Orthologs
Databases	NCBI: entry; OMA: entry
Species	Human	Mouse
Entrez	57592	78266
Ensembl	ENSG00000143373	ENSMUSG00000019338
UniProt	Q8N1G0	Q9D2D7
RefSeq (mRNA)	NM_001304763; NM_001304764; NM_020832	NM_030074; NM_001357863
RefSeq (protein)	NP_001291692; NP_001291693; NP_065883	NP_084350; NP_001344792
Location (UCSC)	Chr 1: 151.28 – 151.29 Mb	Chr 3: 95.01 – 95.02 Mb
PubMed search
- Wikidata
View/Edit Human	View/Edit Mouse

Zinc finger protein 687 is a zinc finger protein that, in humans, is encoded by the ZNF687 gene.
