= TraB domain containing 2B =

Protein found in humans

TRABD2B

Identifiers
- Aliases: TRABD2B, TIKI2, TraB domain containing 2B
- External IDs: OMIM: 614913; MGI: 3650152; GeneCards: TRABD2B

Gene location (Human)
Chr.	Chromosome 1 (human)
Band	1p33	Start	47,760,528 bp
Band	1p33	End	47,997,385 bp

Gene location (Mouse)
Chr.	Chromosome 4 (mouse)
Band	4 D1|4	Start	114,263,921 bp
Band	4 D1|4	End	114,472,295 bp
RNA expression pattern
Bgee	Human / Mouse (ortholog); Top expressed in: popliteal artery; tibial arteries; right coronary artery; left coronary artery; ascending aorta; Descending thoracic aorta; right auricle of heart; human kidney; sural nerve; right lobe of liver / Top expressed in: myocardium of ventricle; interventricular septum; human kidney; right kidney; otolith organ; utricle; external carotid artery; calvaria; internal carotid artery; aorta; More reference expression data
BioGPS	n/a
Gene ontology
Molecular function	Wnt-protein binding; peptidase activity; metalloendopeptidase activity; protein binding; metallopeptidase activity; hydrolase activity; metal ion binding
Cellular component	integral component of membrane; integral component of organelle membrane; plasma membrane; integral component of plasma membrane; membrane
Biological process	negative regulation of Wnt signaling pathway; Wnt signaling pathway; proteolysis; positive regulation of protein oxidation; positive regulation of protein oligomerization
Sources:Amigo / QuickGO
Orthologs
Databases	NCBI: entry; OMA: entry
Species	Human	Mouse
Entrez	388630	666048
Ensembl	ENSG00000269113	ENSMUSG00000070867
UniProt	A6NFA1	B1ATG9
RefSeq (mRNA)	NM_001194986	NM_001085549
RefSeq (protein)	NP_001181915	NP_001079018
Location (UCSC)	Chr 1: 47.76 – 48 Mb	Chr 4: 114.26 – 114.47 Mb
PubMed search
- Wikidata
View/Edit Human	View/Edit Mouse

TraB domain containing 2B is a protein that in humans is encoded by the TRABD2B gene.
