= CACHD1 =

Protein-coding gene in humans

Identifiers
- Aliases: CACHD1, cache domain containing 1
- External IDs: MGI: 2444177; HomoloGene: 10854; GeneCards: CACHD1; OMA:CACHD1 - orthologs

Gene location (Human)
Chr.	Chromosome 1 (human)
Band	1p31.3	Start	64,470,129 bp
Band	1p31.3	End	64,693,058 bp

Gene location (Mouse)
Chr.	Chromosome 4 (mouse)
Band	4|4 C6	Start	100,633,872 bp
Band	4|4 C6	End	100,886,417 bp
RNA expression pattern
Bgee	Human / Mouse (ortholog); Top expressed in: lateral nuclear group of thalamus; mucosa of paranasal sinus; parietal pleura; germinal epithelium; bronchial epithelial cell; synovial membrane; urethra; seminal vesicula; retinal pigment epithelium; corpus epididymis / Top expressed in: Epithelium of choroid plexus; primitive streak; ciliary body; choroid plexus of fourth ventricle; vestibular membrane of cochlear duct; iris; superior colliculus; vestibular sensory epithelium; condyle; trigeminal ganglion; More reference expression data
BioGPS	n/a
Gene ontology
Molecular function	voltage-gated calcium channel activity
Cellular component	membrane; integral component of membrane; voltage-gated calcium channel complex
Biological process	calcium ion transport; ion transport; calcium ion transmembrane transport
Sources:Amigo / QuickGO
Orthologs
Species	Human	Mouse
Entrez	57685	320508
Ensembl	ENSG00000158966	ENSMUSG00000028532
UniProt	Q5VU97	Q6PDJ1
RefSeq (mRNA)	NM_001293274; NM_020925	NM_198037
RefSeq (protein)	NP_001280203; NP_065976	NP_932154
Location (UCSC)	Chr 1: 64.47 – 64.69 Mb	Chr 4: 100.63 – 100.89 Mb
PubMed search
- Wikidata
View/Edit Human	View/Edit Mouse

Cache domain containing 1 is a protein in humans that is encoded by the CACHD1 gene.
