= SFT2 domain containing 2 =

Protein found in humans

SFT2D2

Identifiers
- Aliases: SFT2D2, UNQ512, dJ747L4.C1.2, SFT2 domain containing 2
- External IDs: MGI: 1917362; GeneCards: SFT2D2

Gene location (Human)
Chr.	Chromosome 1 (human)
Band	1q24.2	Start	168,225,938 bp
Band	1q24.2	End	168,253,021 bp

Gene location (Mouse)
Chr.	Chromosome 1 (mouse)
Band	1|1 H2.2	Start	165,001,906 bp
Band	1|1 H2.2	End	165,022,007 bp
RNA expression pattern
Bgee	Human / Mouse (ortholog); Top expressed in: sperm; gums; gingival epithelium; nipple; superficial temporal artery; human penis; mucosa of paranasal sinus; skin of hip; skin of thigh; visceral pleura / Top expressed in: submandibular gland; median eminence; sciatic nerve; parotid gland; granulocyte; vestibular membrane of cochlear duct; lacrimal gland; epithelium of stomach; stria vascularis; iris; More reference expression data
BioGPS	n/a
Gene ontology
Molecular function	molecular function
Cellular component	integral component of membrane; extracellular exosome; membrane
Biological process	protein transport; vesicle-mediated transport; transport; biological process
Sources:Amigo / QuickGO
Orthologs
Databases	NCBI: entry; OMA: entry
Species	Human	Mouse
Entrez	375035	108735
Ensembl	ENSG00000213064	ENSMUSG00000040848
UniProt	O95562	Q8VD57
RefSeq (mRNA)	NM_199344	NM_145512
RefSeq (protein)	NP_955376	NP_663487
Location (UCSC)	Chr 1: 168.23 – 168.25 Mb	Chr 1: 165 – 165.02 Mb
PubMed search
- Wikidata
View/Edit Human	View/Edit Mouse

SFT2 domain containing 2 is a protein that in humans is encoded by the SFT2D2 gene.
