= DYNLT4 =

Protein-coding gene in humans

Identifiers
- Aliases: DYNLT4, Tctex1 domain containing 4, TCTEX1D4, dynein light chain Tctex-type 4
- External IDs: OMIM: 611713; MGI: 3045358; GeneCards: DYNLT4

Gene location (Human)
Chr.	Chromosome 1 (human)
Band	1p34.1	Start	44,805,893 bp
Band	1p34.1	End	44,807,351 bp

Gene location (Mouse)
Chr.	Chromosome 4 (mouse)
Band	4|4 D1	Start	116,983,991 bp
Band	4|4 D1	End	116,985,935 bp
RNA expression pattern
Bgee	Human / Mouse (ortholog); Top expressed in: right uterine tube; olfactory zone of nasal mucosa; bone marrow cell; blood; stromal cell of endometrium; gastric mucosa; right adrenal cortex; left uterine tube; left adrenal cortex; right lung / Top expressed in: granulocyte; olfactory epithelium; embryo; right lung lobe; left lung; left lung lobe; cerebellar cortex; trachea; white adipose tissue; visual cortex; More reference expression data
BioGPS	n/a
Orthologs
Databases	NCBI: entry; OMA: entry
Species	Human	Mouse
Entrez	343521	242646
Ensembl	ENSG00000188396	ENSMUSG00000047671
UniProt	Q5JR98	Q8CDY7
RefSeq (mRNA)	NM_001013632; NM_001377534; NM_001377535; NM_001377536	NM_175030
RefSeq (protein)	NP_001013654; NP_001364463; NP_001364464; NP_001364465	NP_778195
Location (UCSC)	Chr 1: 44.81 – 44.81 Mb	Chr 4: 116.98 – 116.99 Mb
PubMed search
- Wikidata
View/Edit Human	View/Edit Mouse

Dynein light chain Tctex-type 4 is a protein that in humans is encoded by the DYNLT4 gene (previously TCTEX1D4).
