= WD40 repeat =

Protein domain

WD domain, G-beta repeat
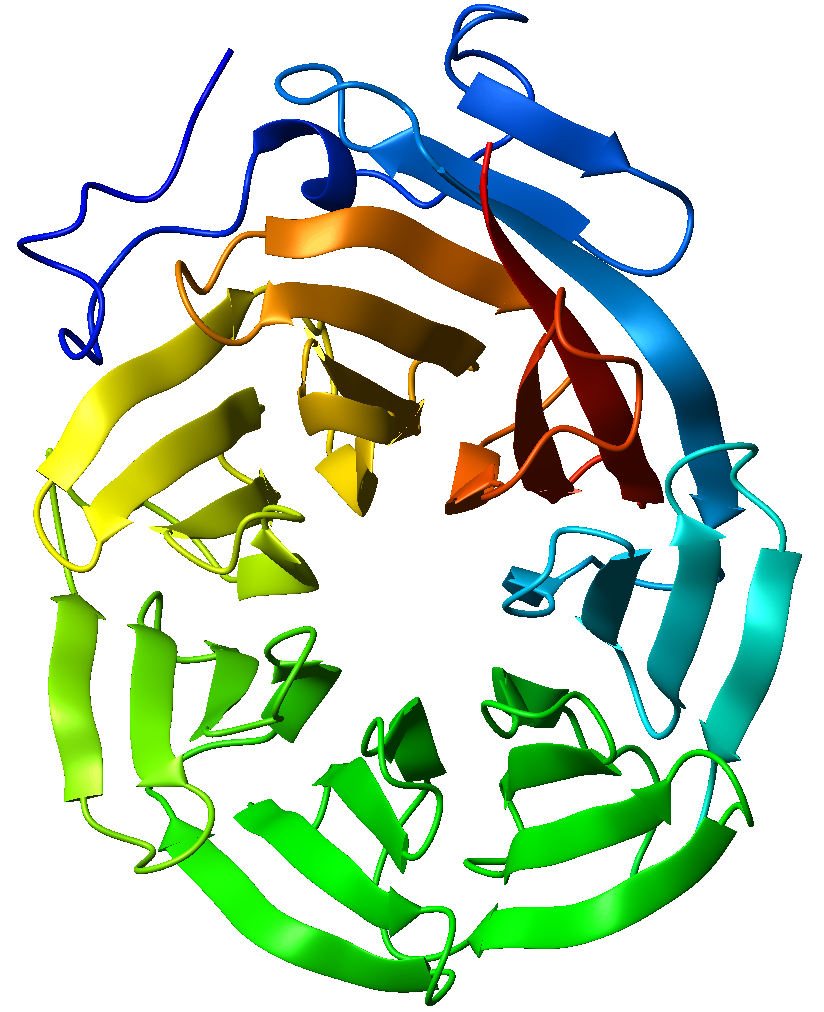
- Ribbon diagram of the C-terminal WD40 domain of Tup1 (a transcriptional corepressor in yeast), which adopts a 7-bladed beta-propeller fold. Ribbon is colored from blue (N-terminus) to red (C-terminus).

Identifiers
- Symbol: WD40
- Pfam: PF00400
- Pfam clan: CL0186
- InterPro: IPR001680
- PROSITE: PDOC00574
- SCOP2: 1gp2 / SCOPe / SUPFAM
- CDD: cd00200
Available protein structures:
- PDB: 1b9x, 1b9y, 1erj, 1gg2, 1got, 1gp2, 1gxr, 1nex, 1nr0, 1omw, 1p22, 1pev, 1pgu, 1pi6, 1s4u, 1sq9, 1tbg, 1u4c, 1xhm, 1yfq, 2bcj, 2ce8, 2ce9, 2trc IPR001680 PF00400 (ECOD; PDBsum)
- AlphaFold: IPR001680; PF00400

The WD40 repeat (also known as the WD or beta-transducin repeat) is a short structural motif of approximately 40 amino acids, often terminating in a tryptophan-aspartic acid (W-D) dipeptide. Tandem copies of these repeats typically fold together to form a type of circular solenoid protein domain called the WD40 domain.

== Structure ==
WD40 domain-containing proteins have 4 to 16 repeating units, all of which are thought to form a circularised beta-propeller structure (see figure to the right). The WD40 domain is composed of about 40 to 60 amino acids with a glycine and histidine dipeptide near the N-terminus and a tryptophan and aspartic acid dipeptide most commonly at the C-terminus. Two variable regions are present. The repeats typically form a four-stranded anti-parallel beta sheet or blade. These blades come together to form a propeller with the most common being a seven-bladed beta propeller. The blades interlock so that the last beta strand of one repeat forms with the first three of the next repeat to form the 3D blade structure.

== Function ==
WD40-repeat proteins are a large family found in all eukaryotes and are implicated in a variety of functions ranging from signal transduction and transcription regulation to cell cycle control, autophagy and apoptosis. The underlying common function of all WD40-repeat proteins is coordinating multi-protein complex assemblies, where the repeating units serve as a rigid scaffold for protein interactions. The specificity of the proteins is determined by the sequences outside the repeats themselves. Examples of such complexes are G proteins (beta subunit is a beta-propeller), TAFII transcription factor, and E3 ubiquitin ligase.

== Examples ==
According to the initial analysis of the human genome WD40 repeats are the eighth largest family of proteins. In all 277 proteins were identified to contain them. Human genes encoding proteins containing this domain include:

- AAAS, AAMP, AHI1, AMBRA1, APAF1, ARPC1A, ARPC1B, ATG16L1,
- BOP1, BRWD1, BRWD3, BTRC, BUB3,
- CDC20, CDC40, CDRT1, CHAF1B, CIAO1, CIRH1A, COPA, COPB2, CORO1A, CORO1B, CORO1C, CORO2A, CORO2B, CORO6, CORO7, CSTF1,
- DDB2, DENND3, DMWD, DMXL1, DMXL2, DNAI1, DNAI2, DNCI1, DTL, DYNC1I1, DYNC1I2, EDC4,
- EED, EIF3S2, ELP2, EML1, EML2, EML3, EML4, EML4-ALK, EML5, ERCC8,
- FBXW10, FBXW11, FBXW2, FBXW4, FBXW5, FBXW7, FBXW8, FBXW9, FZR1,
- GEMIN5, GNB1, GNB1L, GNB2, GNB2L1, GNB3, GNB4, GNB5, GRWD1, GTF3C2,
- HERC1, HIRA, HZGJ,
- IFT121, IFT122, IFT140, IFT172, IFT80, IQWD1,
- KATNB1, KIF21A, KIF21B, KM-PA-2,
- KEAP1,
- LLGL1, LLGL2, LRBA, LRRK1, LRRK2, LRWD1, LYST,
- MAPKBP1, MED16, MLST8, MORG1,
- NBEA, NBEAL1, NEDD1, NLE1, NSMAF, NUP37, NUP43, NWD1,
- PAAF1, PAFAH1B1, PAK1IP1, PEX7, PHIP, PIK3R4, PLAA, PLRG1, PPP2R2A, PPP2R2B, PPP2R2C, PPP2R2D, PPWD1, PREB, PRPF19, PRPF4, PWP1, PWP2,
- RAE1, RPTOR, RBBP4, RBBP5, RBBP7, RFWD2, RFWD3, RRP9,
- SCAP, SEC13, SEC31A, SEC31B, SEH1L, SHKBP1, SMU1, SPAG16, SPG, STRAP, STRN, STRN3, STRN4, STXBP5, STXBP5L,
- TAF5, TAF5L, TBL1X, TBL1XR1, TBL1Y, TBL2, TBL3, TEP1, THOC3, THOC6, TLE1, TLE2, TLE3, TLE4, TLE6, TRAF7, TSSC1, TULP4, TUWD12,
- UTP15, UTP18,
- WAIT1, WDF3, WDFY1, WDFY2, WDFY3, WDFY4, WDHD1, WDR1, WDR10, WDR11, WDR12, WDR13, WDR16, WDR17, WDR18, WDR19, WDR20, WDR21A, WDR21C, WDR22, WDR23, WDR24, WDR25, WDR26, WDR27, WDR3, WDR31, WDR32, WDR33, WDR34, WDR35, WDR36, WDR37, WDR38, WDR4, WDR40A, WDR40B, WDR40C, WDR41, WDR42A, WDR42B, WDR43, WDR44, WDR46, WDR47, WDR48, WDR49, WDR5, WDR51A, WDR51B, WDR52, WDR53, WDR54, WDR55, WDR57, WDR59, WDR5B, WDR6, WDR60, WDR61, WDR62, WDR63, WDR64, WDR65, WDR66, WDR67, WDR68, WDR69, WDR7, WDR70, WDR72, WDR73, WDR74, WDR75, WDR76, WDR77, WDR78, WDR79, WDR8, WDR81, WDR82, WDR85, WDR86, WDR88, WDR89, WDR90, WDR91, WDR92, WDSOF1, WDSUB1, WDTC1, WSB1, WSB2,
- ZFP106

Human WDR genes and associated diseases
WDR gene	other gene names	NCBI Entrez Gene ID	Human disease associated with mutations
WDR1	AIP1; NORI-1; HEL-S-52	9948	
WDR2	CORO2A; IR10; CLIPINB	7464	
WDR3	DIP2; UTP12	10885	
WDR4	TRM82; TRMT82	10785	
WDR5	SWD3; BIG-3; CFAP89	11091	
WDR6		11180	
WDR7	TRAG; KIAA0541; Rabconnectin 3 beta	23335	
WDR8	WRAP73	49856	
WDR9	BRWD1; N143; C21orf107	54014	
WDR10	IFT122; CED; SPG; CED1; WDR10p; WDR140	55764	Sensenbrenner syndrome
WDR11	DR11; HH14; BRWD2; WDR15	55717	Kallmann syndrome
WDR12	YTM1	55759	
WDR13	MG21	64743	
WDR14	GNB1L; GY2; FKSG1; WDVCF; DGCRK3	54584	
WDR15	WDR11		
WDR16	CFAP52; WDRPUH	146845	
WDR17		116966	
WDR18	Ipi3	57418	
WDR19	ATD5; CED4; DYF-2; ORF26; Oseg6; PWDMP; SRTD5; IFT144; NPHP13	57728	Sensenbrenner syndrome, Jeune syndrome
WDR20	DMR	91833	
WDR21	DCAF4; WDR21A	26094	
WDR22	DCAF5; BCRG2; BCRP2	8816	
WDR23	DCAF11; GL014; PRO2389	80344	
WDR24	JFP7; C16orf21	84219	
WDR25	C14orf67	79446	
WDR26	CDW2; GID7; MIP2	80232	
WDR27		253769	
WDR28	GRWD1; CDW4; GRWD; RRB1	83743	
WDR29	SPAG16; PF20	79582	
WDR30	ATG16L1; IBD10; APG16L; ATG16A; ATG16L	55054	Crohn’s disease
WDR31		114987	
WDR32	DCAF10	79269	
WDR33	NET14; WDC146	55339	
WDR34	DIC5; FAP133; SRTD11	89891	Jeune syndrome
WDR35	CED2; IFTA1; SRTD7; IFT121	57539	Sensenbrenner syndrome
WDR36	GLC1G; UTP21; TAWDRP; TA-WDRP	134430	Primary Open Angle Glaucoma
WDR37		22884	
WDR38		401551	
WDR39	CIAO1; CIA1	9391	
WDR40A	DCAF12; CT102; TCC52; KIAA1892	25853	
WDR41	MSTP048	55255	
WDR43	UTP5; NET12	23160	
WDR44	RPH11; RAB11BP	54521	
WDR45	JM5; NBIA4; NBIA5; WDRX1; WIPI4; WIPI-4	11152	Beta-propeller protein-associated neurodegeneration (BPAN)
WDR46	UTP7; BING4; FP221; C6orf11	9277	
WDR47	NEMITIN; KIAA0893	22911	
WDR48	P80; UAF1; SPG60	57599	
WDR49		151790	
WDR50	UTP18; CGI-48	51096	
WDR52	CFAP44	55779	
WDR53		348793	
WDR54		84058	
WDR55		54853	
WDR56	IFT80; ATD2; SRTD2	57560	Jeune syndrome
WDR57	SNRNP40; SPF38; PRP8BP; HPRP8BP; PRPF8BP	9410	
WDR58	THOC6; BBIS; fSAP35	79228	
WDR59	FP977	79726	
WDR60	SRPS6; SRTD8; FAP163	55112	Jeune syndrome
WDR61	SKI8; REC14	80349	
WDR62	MCPH2; C19orf14	284403	microcephaly
WDR63	DIC3; NYD-SP29	126820	
WDR64		128025	
WDR65	CFAP57; VWS2	149465	Van der Woude syndrome
WDR66	CaM-IP4	144406	
WDR67	TBC1D31; Gm85	93594	
WDR68	DCAF7; AN11; HAN11; SWAN-1	10238	
WDR69	DAW1; ODA16	164781	
WDR70		55100	
WDR71	PAAF1; PAAF; Rpn14	80227	
WDR72	AI2A3	256764	Amelogenesis imperfecta
WDR73	HSPC264	84942	
WDR74		54663	
WDR75	NET16; UTP17	84128	
WDR76	CDW14	79968	
WDR77	p44; MEP50; MEP-50; HKMT1069; Nbla10071; p44/Mep50	79084	
WDR78	DIC4	79819	
WDR79	WRAP53; DKCB3; TCAB1	55135	
WDR80	ATG16L; ATG16B	89849	
WDR81	CAMRQ2; PPP1R166	124997	cerebellar ataxia, mental retardation, and dysequilibrium syndrome-2
WDR82	SWD2; MST107; WDR82A; MSTP107; PRO2730; TMEM113; PRO34047	80335	
WDR83	MORG1	84292	
WDR84	PAK1IP1; PIP1; MAK11	55003	
WDR85	DPH7; RRT2; C9orf112	92715	
WDR86		349136	
WDR87	NYD-SP11	83889	
WDR88	PQWD	126248	
WDR89	MSTP050; C14orf150	112840	
WDR90	C16orf15; C16orf16; C16orf17; C16orf18; C16orf19	197335	
WDR91	HSPC049	29062	
WDR92	MONAD	116143	
WDR93		56964	
WDR94	AMBRA1; DCAF3	55626	
WDR96	CFAP43; C10orf79	80217	

== See also ==
- Beta-propeller
- Protein tandem repeats
