= DCAF11 =

Protein-coding gene in the species Danio rerio

Identifiers
- Aliases: DCAF11, PRO2389, WDR23, GL014, DDB1 and CUL4 associated factor 11
- External IDs: OMIM: 613317; MGI: 90168; GeneCards: DCAF11

Gene location (Human)
Chr.	Chromosome 14 (human)
Band	14q12	Start	24,114,195 bp
Band	14q12	End	24,125,242 bp

Gene location (Mouse)
Chr.	Chromosome 14 (mouse)
Band	14 C3|14 28.19 cM	Start	55,797,463 bp
Band	14 C3|14 28.19 cM	End	55,807,522 bp
RNA expression pattern
Bgee	Human / Mouse (ortholog); Top expressed in: right lobe of liver; duodenum; body of pancreas; sural nerve; skeletal muscle tissue; blood; granulocyte; muscle of leg; bone marrow; gastrocnemius muscle / Top expressed in: left lobe of liver; ankle; vestibular membrane of cochlear duct; right kidney; muscle of thigh; transitional epithelium of urinary bladder; temporal muscle; right ventricle; sternocleidomastoid muscle; triceps brachii muscle; More reference expression data
BioGPS	n/a
Gene ontology
Molecular function	protein binding
Cellular component	Cul4-RING E3 ubiquitin ligase complex; nucleoplasm
Biological process	post-translational protein modification; protein ubiquitination; proteasome-mediated ubiquitin-dependent protein catabolic process
Sources:Amigo / QuickGO
Orthologs
Databases	NCBI: entry; OMA: entry
Species	Human	Mouse
Entrez	80344	28199
Ensembl	ENSG00000100897; ENSG00000284796	ENSMUSG00000022214
UniProt	Q8TEB1	Q91VU6
RefSeq (mRNA)	NM_001163484; NM_025230; NM_181357	NM_001199009; NM_133734
RefSeq (protein)	NP_001156956; NP_079506; NP_852002	NP_001185938; NP_598495
Location (UCSC)	Chr 14: 24.11 – 24.13 Mb	Chr 14: 55.8 – 55.81 Mb
PubMed search
- Wikidata
View/Edit Human	View/Edit Mouse

DDB1- and CUL4-associated factor 11 also known as WD Repeat Domain 23 (WDR23) is a protein that in humans is encoded by the DCAF11 gene.

DCAF11 is a WD40 repeat protein, containing seven repeats of the closed circular solenoid protein domain WD40. WDR-23 exists in two spatially distinct isoforms produced by alternative splicing, a cytoplasmic WDR-23A and nuclear WDR-23B. Nuclear and cytoplasmic versions of WDR-23 have distinct roles.
