= WDR1 =

Protein-coding gene in humans

Identifiers
- Aliases: WDR1, AIP1, HEL-S-52, NORI-1, WD repeat domain 1, PFITS
- External IDs: OMIM: 604734; MGI: 1337100; GeneCards: WDR1

Gene location (Human)
| Chr. | Chromosome 4 (human) |
| Band | 4p16.1 | Start | 10,074,339 bp |
| Band | 4p16.1 | End | 10,116,949 bp |

Gene location (Mouse)
| Chr. | Chromosome 5 (mouse) |
| Band | 5 B3|5 20.63 cM | Start | 38,684,156 bp |
| Band | 5 B3|5 20.63 cM | End | 38,720,564 bp |
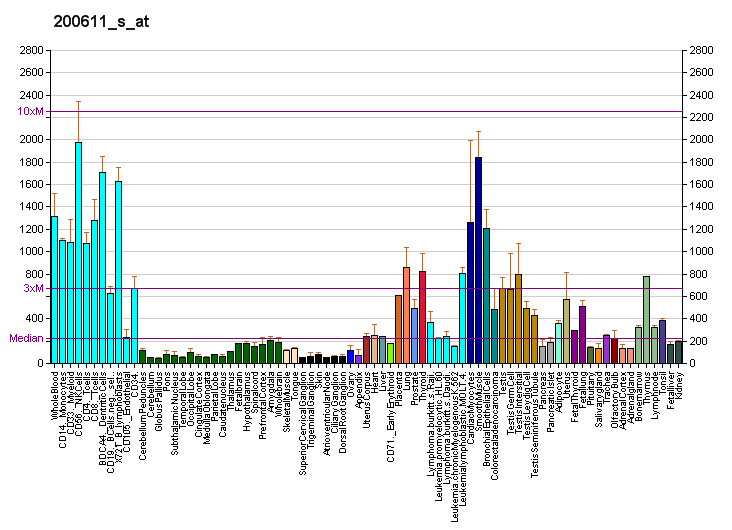

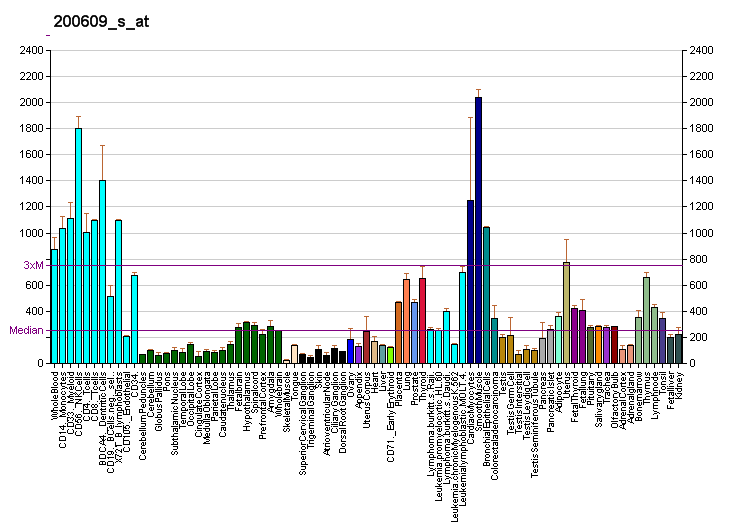

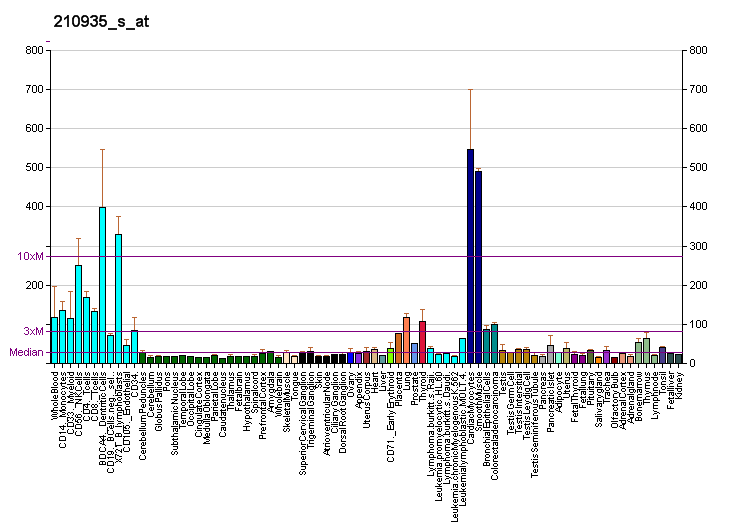
RNA expression pattern
| Bgee | Human / Mouse (ortholog); Top expressed in: popliteal artery; tibial arteries; smooth muscle tissue; right coronary artery; body of uterus; saphenous vein; stromal cell of endometrium; parotid gland; thoracic aorta; mucosa of sigmoid colon / Top expressed in: ankle joint; granulocyte; mesenteric lymph nodes; stroma of bone marrow; transitional epithelium of urinary bladder; corneal stroma; mucous cell of stomach; tibiofemoral joint; left colon; molar; More reference expression data |
| BioGPS | More reference expression data |
Gene ontology
| Molecular function | actin binding; actin filament binding |
| Cellular component | extracellular region; myelin sheath; podosome; cell junction; cell projection; extracellular exosome; cytoskeleton; actin filament; cell-cell junction; cytoplasm; cytosol; cortical actin cytoskeleton; plasma membrane |
| Biological process | platelet degranulation; hearing; actin cytoskeleton organization; regulation of ventricular cardiac muscle cell membrane repolarization; regulation of oligodendrocyte differentiation; maintenance of epithelial cell apical/basal polarity; apical junction assembly; regulation of actin filament depolymerization; neutrophil mediated immunity; regulation of cell shape; actin filament fragmentation; platelet formation; positive regulation of actin filament depolymerization; cortical cytoskeleton organization; locomotion; establishment of planar polarity of follicular epithelium; sarcomere organization; neutrophil migration; actin filament depolymerization |
Sources:Amigo / QuickGO
Orthologs
| Databases | NCBI: entry; OMA: entry |
| Species | Human | Mouse |
| Entrez | 9948 | 22388 |
| Ensembl | ENSG00000071127 | ENSMUSG00000005103 |
| UniProt | O75083 | O88342 |
| RefSeq (mRNA) | NM_005112; NM_017491 | NM_011715 |
| RefSeq (protein) | NP_005103; NP_059830 | NP_035845 |
| Location (UCSC) | Chr 4: 10.07 – 10.12 Mb | Chr 5: 38.68 – 38.72 Mb |
| PubMed search |
- Wikidata
| View/Edit Human | View/Edit Mouse |

WD repeat-containing protein 1, also called Actin-interacting protein 1 (AIP1), is a protein that in humans is encoded by the WDR1 gene. This protein is involved in cytokinesis (the final stage of cell division), and helps induce the disassembly of actin filaments.

== Structure ==
This protein contains 9 WD40 repeats. WD repeats are approximately 30- to 40-amino acid domains containing several conserved residues, mostly including a trp-asp at the C-terminal end. WD domains are involved in protein-protein interactions.

== Medical significance ==
Pathogenic mutations in this gene are associated with immunodeficiency that often manifests as recurring respiratory infections, designated periodic fever, immunodeficiency, and thrombocytopenia syndrome (PFITS), also called WDR1 deficiency or Lazy leukocyte syndrome. This disorder is inherited in an autosomal recessive manner.
