= FBXW8 =

Protein-coding gene in humans

Identifiers
- Aliases: FBXW8, FBW6, FBW8, FBX29, FBXO29, FBXW6, F-box and WD repeat domain containing 8
- External IDs: OMIM: 609073; MGI: 1923041; GeneCards: FBXW8

Gene location (Human)
Chr.	Chromosome 12 (human)
Band	12q24.22	Start	116,910,950 bp
Band	12q24.22	End	117,031,148 bp

Gene location (Mouse)
Chr.	Chromosome 5 (mouse)
Band	5|5 F	Start	118,203,030 bp
Band	5|5 F	End	118,293,529 bp
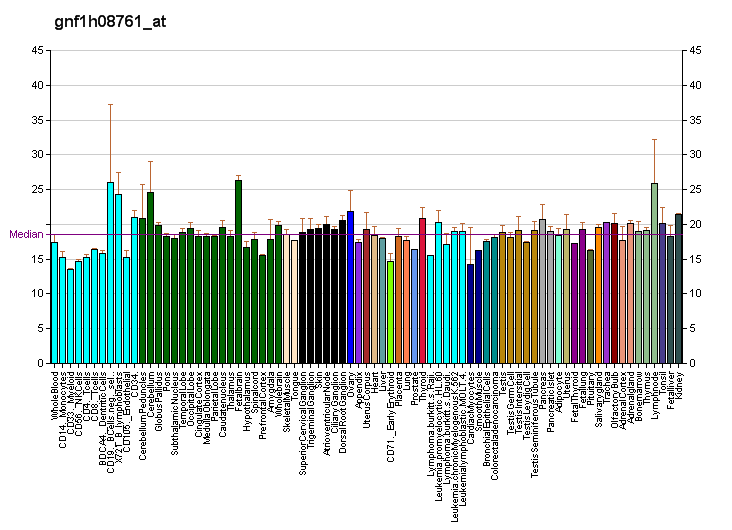
RNA expression pattern
Bgee	Human / Mouse (ortholog); Top expressed in: stromal cell of endometrium; gonad; ventricular zone; bone marrow cell; islet of Langerhans; ganglionic eminence; epithelium of colon; testicle; popliteal artery; tibial arteries / Top expressed in: otic vesicle; otic placode; saccule; interventricular septum; internal carotid artery; external carotid artery; somite; calvaria; yolk sac; lumbar spinal ganglion; More reference expression data
BioGPS	More reference expression data
Gene ontology
Molecular function	protein binding; ubiquitin-protein transferase activity
Cellular component	perinuclear region of cytoplasm; Golgi apparatus; Cul7-RING ubiquitin ligase complex; SCF ubiquitin ligase complex; 3M complex; cytoplasm; cytosol
Biological process	cell population proliferation; positive regulation of dendrite morphogenesis; spongiotrophoblast layer development; labyrinthine layer blood vessel development; Golgi organization; protein ubiquitination; protein polyubiquitination; post-translational protein modification; positive regulation of transcription factor catabolic process
Sources:Amigo / QuickGO
Orthologs
Databases	NCBI: entry; OMA: entry
Species	Human	Mouse
Entrez	26259	231672
Ensembl	ENSG00000174989	ENSMUSG00000032867
UniProt	Q8N3Y1	Q8BIA4
RefSeq (mRNA)	NM_012174; NM_153348	NM_172721
RefSeq (protein)	NP_036306; NP_699179	NP_766309
Location (UCSC)	Chr 12: 116.91 – 117.03 Mb	Chr 5: 118.2 – 118.29 Mb
PubMed search
- Wikidata
View/Edit Human	View/Edit Mouse

F-box/WD repeat-containing protein 8 is a protein that in humans is encoded by the FBXW8 gene.

This gene encodes a member of the F-box protein family, members of which are characterized by an approximately 40 amino acid motif, the F-box. The F-box proteins constitute one of the four subunits of ubiquitin-protein ligase complex called SCFs (SKP1-cullin-F-box), which function in phosphorylation-dependent ubiquitination. The F-box proteins are divided into three classes: Fbws containing WD-40 domains, Fbls containing leucine-rich repeats, and Fbxs containing either different protein-protein interaction modules or no recognizable motifs. The protein encoded by this gene contains a WD-40 domain, in addition to an F-box motif, so it belongs to the Fbw class. Alternatively spliced transcript variants encoding distinct isoforms have been identified for this gene.
