= WDR33 =

Protein-coding gene in the species Homo sapiens

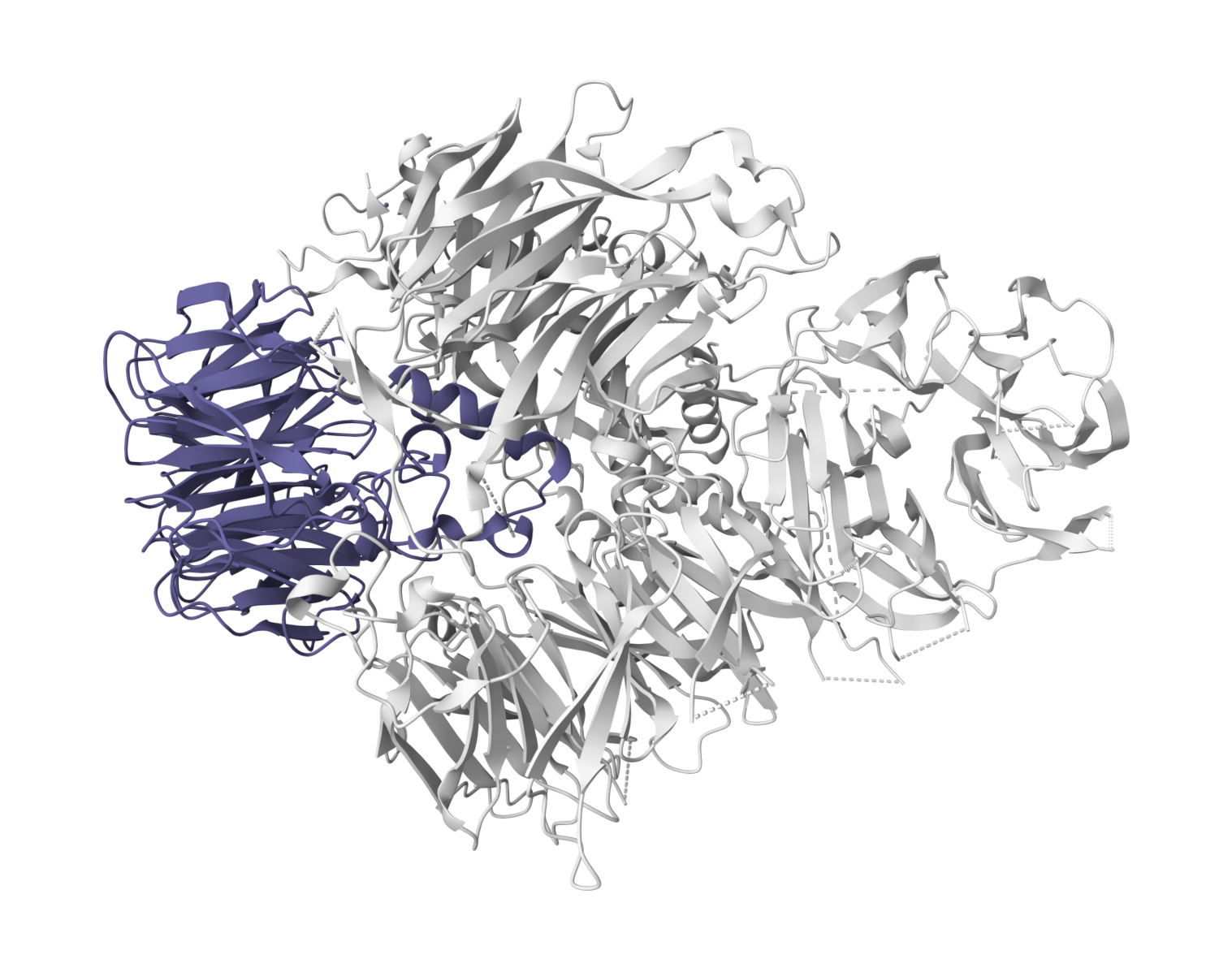

Identifiers
- Aliases: WDR33, NET14, WDC146, WD repeat domain 33
- External IDs: OMIM: 618082; MGI: 1921570; GeneCards: WDR33

Gene location (Human)
Chr.	Chromosome 2 (human)
Band	2q14.3	Start	127,701,027 bp
Band	2q14.3	End	127,811,187 bp

Gene location (Mouse)
Chr.	Chromosome 18 (mouse)
Band	18|18 B1	Start	31,937,143 bp
Band	18|18 B1	End	32,040,450 bp
RNA expression pattern
Bgee	Human / Mouse (ortholog); Top expressed in: gingival epithelium; vena cava; amniotic fluid; oocyte; tibia; Achilles tendon; ganglionic eminence; secondary oocyte; endothelial cell; cerebellar hemisphere / Top expressed in: otic vesicle; saccule; otic placode; Rostral migratory stream; zygote; internal carotid artery; vestibular membrane of cochlear duct; fetal liver hematopoietic progenitor cell; condyle; secondary oocyte; More reference expression data
BioGPS	n/a
Gene ontology
Molecular function	RNA binding
Cellular component	mRNA cleavage and polyadenylation specificity factor complex; collagen; nucleus; fibrillar center; nucleoplasm
Biological process	mRNA processing; mRNA cleavage; postreplication repair; spermatogenesis; mRNA splicing, via spliceosome; termination of RNA polymerase II transcription; mRNA export from nucleus; mRNA 3'-end processing; mRNA polyadenylation
Sources:Amigo / QuickGO
Orthologs
Databases	NCBI: entry; OMA: entry
Species	Human	Mouse
Entrez	55339	74320
Ensembl	ENSG00000136709	ENSMUSG00000024400
UniProt	Q9C0J8	Q8K4P0
RefSeq (mRNA)	NM_001006622; NM_001006623; NM_018383	NM_001170966; NM_001170967; NM_001170970; NM_028866
RefSeq (protein)	NP_001006623; NP_001006624; NP_060853	NP_001164437; NP_001164438; NP_001164441; NP_083142
Location (UCSC)	Chr 2: 127.7 – 127.81 Mb	Chr 18: 31.94 – 32.04 Mb
PubMed search
- Wikidata
View/Edit Human	View/Edit Mouse

WD repeat-containing protein 33 is a protein that in humans is encoded by the WDR33 gene.

This gene encodes a member of the WD repeat protein family. WD repeats are minimally conserved regions of approximately 40 amino acids typically bracketed by gly-his and trp-asp (GH-WD), which may facilitate formation of heterotrimeric or multiprotein complexes. Members of this family are involved in a variety of cellular processes, including cell cycle progression, signal transduction, apoptosis, and gene regulation. This gene is highly expressed in testis and the protein is localized to the nucleus. This gene may play important roles in the mechanisms of cytodifferentiation and/or DNA recombination. Multiple alternatively spliced transcript variants encoding distinct isoforms have been found for this gene.
