= WDR47 =

Protein-coding gene in humans

Identifiers
- Aliases: WDR47, WD repeat domain 47
- External IDs: OMIM: 615734; MGI: 2139593; GeneCards: WDR47

Gene location (Human)
Chr.	Chromosome 1 (human)
Band	1p13.3	Start	108,970,214 bp
Band	1p13.3	End	109,042,113 bp

Gene location (Mouse)
Chr.	Chromosome 3 (mouse)
Band	3|3 F3	Start	108,498,595 bp
Band	3|3 F3	End	108,553,035 bp
RNA expression pattern
Bgee	Human / Mouse (ortholog); Top expressed in: lateral nuclear group of thalamus; ganglionic eminence; orbitofrontal cortex; Region I of hippocampus proper; postcentral gyrus; pars compacta; superior frontal gyrus; Brodmann area 10; pars reticulata; ventricular zone / Top expressed in: neural layer of retina; hippocampus proper; facial motor nucleus; temporal lobe; piriform cortex; dentate gyrus of hippocampal formation granule cell; amygdala; nucleus accumbens; prefrontal cortex; medial geniculate nucleus; More reference expression data
BioGPS	n/a
Gene ontology
Molecular function	protein binding
Cellular component	cytoskeleton; cytoplasm; microtubule
Biological process	multicellular organism development
Sources:Amigo / QuickGO
Orthologs
Databases	NCBI: entry; OMA: entry
Species	Human	Mouse
Entrez	22911	99512
Ensembl	ENSG00000085433	ENSMUSG00000040389
UniProt	O94967	Q8CGF6
RefSeq (mRNA)	NM_001142550; NM_001142551; NM_014969	NM_181400; NM_001358053; NM_001358054; NM_001358055
RefSeq (protein)	NP_001136022; NP_001136023; NP_055784	NP_852065; NP_001344982; NP_001344983; NP_001344984
Location (UCSC)	Chr 1: 108.97 – 109.04 Mb	Chr 3: 108.5 – 108.55 Mb
PubMed search
- Wikidata
View/Edit Human	View/Edit Mouse

WD repeat domain 47 is a protein that in humans is encoded by the WDR47 gene.

== See also ==
- WD repeat
