= NEDD1 =

Protein-coding gene in the species Homo sapiens

Identifiers
- Aliases: NEDD1, GCP-WD, TUBGCP7, neural precursor cell expressed, developmentally down-regulated 1, NEDD1 gamma-tubulin ring complex targeting factor
- External IDs: OMIM: 600372; MGI: 97293; GeneCards: NEDD1

Gene location (Human)
Chr.	Chromosome 12 (human)
Band	12q23.1	Start	96,907,224 bp
Band	12q23.1	End	96,953,780 bp

Gene location (Mouse)
Chr.	Chromosome 10 (mouse)
Band	10|10 C2	Start	92,520,608 bp
Band	10|10 C2	End	92,558,282 bp
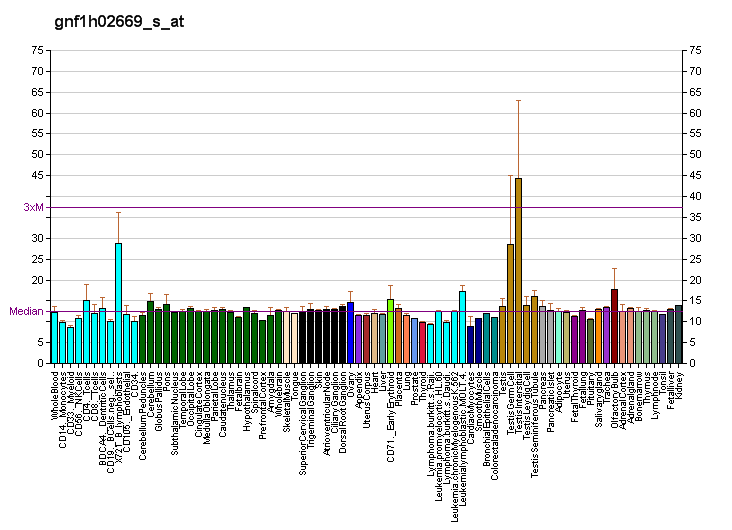

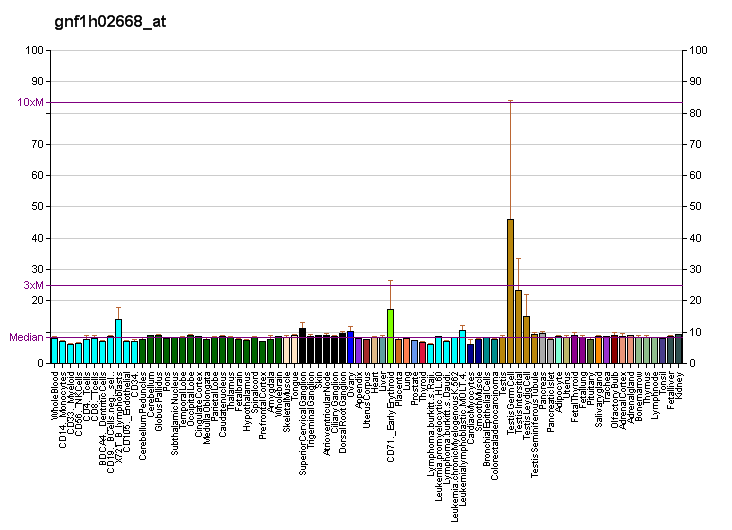
RNA expression pattern
Bgee	Human / Mouse (ortholog); Top expressed in: secondary oocyte; Skeletal muscle tissue of rectus abdominis; biceps brachii; sperm; vastus lateralis muscle; deltoid muscle; buccal mucosa cell; ventricular zone; Skeletal muscle tissue of biceps brachii; tibialis anterior muscle / Top expressed in: zygote; secondary oocyte; primary oocyte; atrium; right ventricle; cardiac muscles; digastric muscle; genital tubercle; myocardium of ventricle; triceps brachii muscle; More reference expression data
BioGPS	More reference expression data
Gene ontology
Molecular function	protein binding
Cellular component	cytoplasm; microtubule organizing center; ciliary basal body; centriole; cytosol; centrosome; apical part of cell; spindle pole; pericentriolar material; cytoskeleton
Biological process	cell division; protein localization to centrosome; cell cycle; G2/M transition of mitotic cell cycle; ciliary basal body-plasma membrane docking; regulation of G2/M transition of mitotic cell cycle
Sources:Amigo / QuickGO
Orthologs
Databases	NCBI: entry; OMA: entry
Species	Human	Mouse
Entrez	121441	17997
Ensembl	ENSG00000139350	ENSMUSG00000019988
UniProt	Q8NHV4	P33215
RefSeq (mRNA)	NM_001135175; NM_001135176; NM_001135177; NM_152905	NM_008682
RefSeq (protein)	NP_001128647; NP_001128648; NP_001128649; NP_690869	NP_032708
Location (UCSC)	Chr 12: 96.91 – 96.95 Mb	Chr 10: 92.52 – 92.56 Mb
PubMed search
- Wikidata
View/Edit Human	View/Edit Mouse

Neural precursor cell expressed, developmentally down-regulated 1, also known as Nedd1, is a human gene and encodes the protein NEDD1.

NEDD1 is localized in the centrosome and it plays a role in mitosis through its interaction with γ-tubulin. WD40 repeats are located in the amino-terminal of the protein and are responsible for NEDD1 localization in the centrosome, and the carboxy-terminal amino acids are needed for interactions with γ-tubulin. Depletion of NEDD1 causes impaired centrosome and chromatin microtubules assembly that results in the failure of microtubule nucleation and prevents proper spindle formation.
