= Nucleoporin 43 =

Protein-coding gene in the species Homo sapiens

NUP43

Identifiers
- Aliases: NUP43, bA350J20.1, p42, nucleoporin 43kDa, nucleoporin 43
- External IDs: OMIM: 608141; MGI: 1917162; GeneCards: NUP43
Available structures
PDB	Ortholog search: PDBe RCSB
PDB	List of PDB id codes 4I79, 5A9Q

Gene location (Human)
Chr.	Chromosome 6 (human)
Band	6q25.1	Start	149,724,315 bp
Band	6q25.1	End	149,749,665 bp

Gene location (Mouse)
Chr.	Chromosome 10 (mouse)
Band	10|10 A1	Start	7,543,267 bp
Band	10|10 A1	End	7,554,645 bp
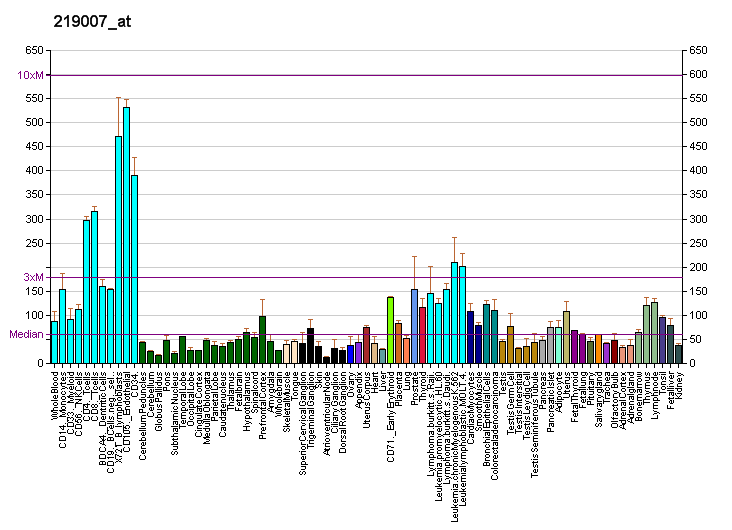
RNA expression pattern
Bgee	Human / Mouse (ortholog); Top expressed in: oocyte; secondary oocyte; seminal vesicula; oral cavity; pylorus; hair follicle; parietal pleura; visceral pleura; renal medulla; germinal epithelium / Top expressed in: epiblast; primary oocyte; tail of embryo; embryo; genital tubercle; secondary oocyte; embryo; morula; blastocyst; zygote; More reference expression data
BioGPS	More reference expression data
Gene ontology
Molecular function	protein binding
Cellular component	cytosol; nuclear envelope; nuclear pore; chromosome; chromosome, centromeric region; nucleus; kinetochore; nuclear pore outer ring; host cell
Biological process	mRNA transport; chromosome segregation; cell division; protein transport; cell cycle; viral process; mRNA export from nucleus; regulation of glycolytic process; tRNA export from nucleus; protein sumoylation; viral transcription; regulation of gene silencing by miRNA; intracellular transport of virus; regulation of cellular response to heat
Sources:Amigo / QuickGO
Orthologs
Databases	NCBI: entry; OMA: entry
Species	Human	Mouse
Entrez	348995	69912
Ensembl	ENSG00000120253	ENSMUSG00000040034
UniProt	Q8NFH3	P59235
RefSeq (mRNA)	NM_024647; NM_198887	NM_145706
RefSeq (protein)	NP_942590	NP_663752
Location (UCSC)	Chr 6: 149.72 – 149.75 Mb	Chr 10: 7.54 – 7.55 Mb
PubMed search
- Wikidata
View/Edit Human	View/Edit Mouse

Nucleoporin 43 (Nup43) is a protein that in humans is encoded by the NUP43 gene.

Bidirectional transport of macromolecules between the cytoplasm and nucleus occurs through nuclear pore complexes (NPCs) embedded in the nuclear envelope. NPCs are composed of subcomplexes, and NUP43 is part of one such subcomplex, Nup107-160 (Loiodice et al., 2004).[supplied by OMIM] Along with other nucleoporins.

== Structure ==
It folds into a canonical WD40 repeat domain.

== Disease association ==
High expression of NUP43 in breast cancer is associated with poor overall survival. In chronic myelogenous leukemia (CML), reduction of miRNA-409-5p increases the expression of NUP43 that in turn enhances proliferative potential, cell cycle progression, and imatinib resistance.

Some Nup43 variants have been characterized as causal for the onset of cardiovascular disease (CVD), while Nup43 expression has been associated with attention deficit hyperactivity disorder.
