= WDR75 =

Protein-coding gene in humans

Identifiers
- Aliases: WDR75, NET16, UTP17, WD repeat domain 75
- External IDs: MGI: 1920924; GeneCards: WDR75

Gene location (Human)
Chr.	Chromosome 2 (human)
Band	2q32.2	Start	189,441,446 bp
Band	2q32.2	End	189,475,552 bp

Gene location (Mouse)
Chr.	Chromosome 1 (mouse)
Band	1|1 C1.1	Start	45,834,326 bp
Band	1|1 C1.1	End	45,862,779 bp
RNA expression pattern
Bgee	Human / Mouse (ortholog); Top expressed in: skin of arm; cardiac muscle tissue of right atrium; myocardium of left ventricle; cartilage tissue; smooth muscle tissue; gonad; Achilles tendon; body of uterus; left ovary; right ovary / Top expressed in: otic placode; primitive streak; genital tubercle; morula; epiblast; tail of embryo; abdominal wall; saccule; yolk sac; embryo; More reference expression data
BioGPS	n/a
Gene ontology
Molecular function	RNA binding
Cellular component	nucleus; nucleoplasm; nucleolus
Biological process	regulation of autophagy of mitochondrion; positive regulation of protein targeting to mitochondrion; positive regulation of transcription by RNA polymerase I; positive regulation of rRNA processing; transcription, DNA-templated; regulation of transcription, DNA-templated; rRNA processing; ribosome biogenesis
Sources:Amigo / QuickGO
Orthologs
Databases	NCBI: entry; OMA: entry
Species	Human	Mouse
Entrez	84128	73674
Ensembl	ENSG00000115368	ENSMUSG00000025995
UniProt	Q8IWA0	Q3U821
RefSeq (mRNA)	NM_032168; NM_001303096	NM_028599
RefSeq (protein)	NP_001290025; NP_115544	NP_082875
Location (UCSC)	Chr 2: 189.44 – 189.48 Mb	Chr 1: 45.83 – 45.86 Mb
PubMed search
- Wikidata
View/Edit Human	View/Edit Mouse

WD repeat-containing protein 75 (WDR75) is a protein that in humans is encoded by the WDR75 gene. It contains a WD40 superfamily domain. The WD40 domain is found throughout many eukaryotic cell types and is known to be involved in cellular regulator functions such as pre-mRNA processing and cytoskeleton assembly. The function of the WDR75 protein is not defined by the scientific community.

Accession numbers	Location	Identifiers	M.W.	pI
NM_032186, NP_115544.1	2q32.2	FLJ12519, DKFZp781N2144	94.5 kDa	5.56

== Protein sequence ==
The amino acid sequence is 830 residues long and contains an acidic tail.

1 MVEEENIRVV RCGGSELNFR RAVFSADSKY IFCVSGDFVK VYSTVTEECV HILHGHRNLV 
61 TGIQLNPNNH LQLYSCSLDG TIKLWDYIDG ILIKTFIVGC KLHALFTLAQ AEDSVFVIVN 
121 KEKPDIFQLV SVKLPKSSSQ EVEAKELSFV LDYINQSPKC IAFGNEGVYV AAVREFYLSV 
181 YFFKKKTTSR FTLSSSRNKK HAKNNFTCVA CHPTEDCIAS GHMDGKIRLW RNFYDDKKYT 
241 YTCLHWHHDM VMDLAFSVTG TSLLSGGRES VLVEWRDATE KNKEFLPRLG ATIEHISVSP 
301 AGDLFCTSHS DNKIIIIHRN LEASAVIQGL VKDRSIFTGL MIDPRTKALV LNGKPGHLQF 
361 YSLQSDKQLY NLDIIQQEYI NDYGLIQIEL TKAAFGCFGN WLATVEQRQE KETELELQMK 
421 LWMYNKKTQG FILNTKINMP HEDCITALCF CNAEKSEQPT LVTASKDGYF KVWILTDDSD 
481 IYKKAVGWTC DFVGSYHKYQ ATNCCFSEDG SLLAVSFEEI VTIWDSVTWE LKCTFCQRAG 
541 KIRHLCFGRL TCSKYLLGAT ENGILCCWNL LSCALEWNAK LNVRVMEPDP NSENIAAISQ 
601 SSVGSDLFVF KPSEPRPLYI QKGISREKVQ WGVFVPRDVP ESFTSEAYQW LNRSQFYFLT 
661 KSQSLLTFST KSPEEKLTPT SKQLLAEESL PTTPFYFILG KHRQQQDEKL NETLENELVQ 
721 LPLTENIPAI SELLHTPAHV LPSAAFLCSM FVNSLLLSKE TKSAKEIPED VDMEEEKESE 
781 DSDEENDFTE KVQDTSNTGL GEDIIHQLSK SEEKELRKFR KIDYSWIAAL   

== Secondary structure ==
The secondary structure is predicted to contain alternating sets of alpha helices and beta strands. No helix-turn-helix (HTH) regions were predicted.

== Homology ==
No known paralogs exist for the Human gene. No paralogs were found for the cow, mouse, or rat orthologs of WDR75. Conservation among mammalian orthologs to the human gene was strong, with minimum identity among orthologs at 76%. The following table summarizes some vertebrate and invertebrate orthologs. Conservation of specific amino acids from positions 340–390, 430- 450, and 515-530 all correlate to predicted alpha helices.

Organism	Accession number	% Identity to Human Gene
Bos Taurus	NP_001095532.1	91.7
Mus musculus	NP_082875.1	84.9
Pan troglodytes	XP_001164827.1	99.5
Rattus norvegicus	NP_001041354.1	84.3
Canis familiaris	XP_545565	90.7
Xenopus Laevis	NP_001086564.1	61.0
Gallus gallus	XP_001233408.1	60.8
Schizosaccharomyces pombe	NP_594798	19.9
Anopheles gambiae	XP_317524	22.7
