= WRAP73 =

Protein-coding gene in humans

Identifiers
- Aliases: WRAP73, WDR8, WD repeat containing, antisense to TP73
- External IDs: OMIM: 606040; MGI: 1891749; GeneCards: WRAP73

Gene location (Human)
Chr.	Chromosome 1 (human)
Band	1p36.32	Start	3,630,767 bp
Band	1p36.32	End	3,652,761 bp

Gene location (Mouse)
Chr.	Chromosome 4 (mouse)
Band	4|4 E2	Start	154,226,829 bp
Band	4|4 E2	End	154,251,877 bp
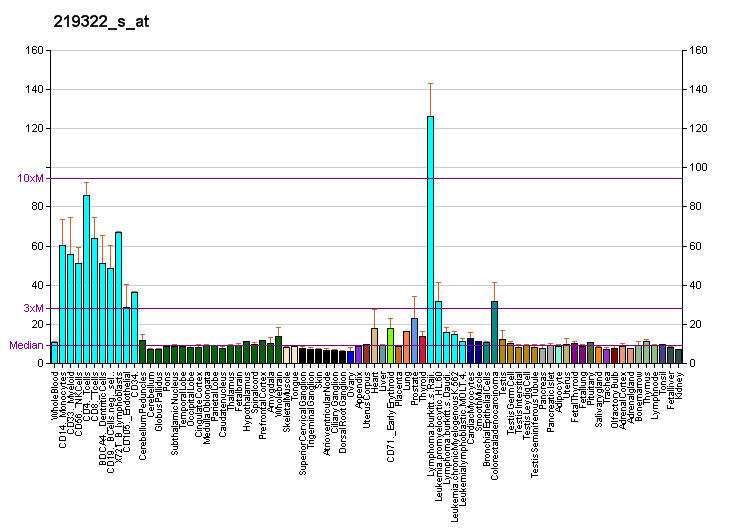
RNA expression pattern
Bgee	Human / Mouse (ortholog); Top expressed in: granulocyte; gonad; right hemisphere of cerebellum; mucosa of transverse colon; spleen; anterior pituitary; apex of heart; blood; monocyte; body of stomach / Top expressed in: condyle; fossa; medial ganglionic eminence; Rostral migratory stream; motor neuron; saccule; facial motor nucleus; internal carotid artery; external carotid artery; medullary collecting duct; More reference expression data
BioGPS	More reference expression data
Gene ontology
Molecular function	protein binding
Cellular component	cytoplasm; centrosome; centriole; cytoskeleton; ciliary basal body; microtubule organizing center
Biological process	positive regulation of non-motile cilium assembly; cell projection organization; mitotic spindle assembly
Sources:Amigo / QuickGO
Orthologs
Databases	NCBI: entry; OMA: entry
Species	Human	Mouse
Entrez	49856	59002
Ensembl	ENSG00000116213	ENSMUSG00000029029
UniProt	Q9P2S5	Q9JM98
RefSeq (mRNA)	NM_017818	NM_021499
RefSeq (protein)	NP_060288	NP_067474
Location (UCSC)	Chr 1: 3.63 – 3.65 Mb	Chr 4: 154.23 – 154.25 Mb
PubMed search
- Wikidata
View/Edit Human	View/Edit Mouse

WD repeat-containing protein WRAP73 is a protein that in humans is encoded by the WRAP73 gene (previously WDR8). The gene symbol is short for "WD repeat containing, antisense to TP73", indicating the genes close position and opposite direction compared to the gene TP73.

== Function ==
This gene encodes a member of the WD repeat protein family. WD repeats are minimally conserved regions of approximately 40 amino acids typically bracketed by gly-his and trp-asp (GH-WD), which may facilitate formation of heterotrimeric or multiprotein complexes. Members of this family are involved in a variety of cellular processes, including cell cycle progression, signal transduction, apoptosis, and gene regulation. This family member is 89% identical to the mouse Wdr8 protein at the amino acid level. The function of this protein is not known, and the mouse studies suggest that the Wdr8 protein may play a role in the process of ossification (osteogenesis).
