= Bromodomain and WD repeat-containing protein 3 =

Protein-coding gene in humans

BRWD3

Identifiers
- Aliases: BRWD3, BRODL, MRX93, bromodomain and WD repeat domain containing 3, XLID93
- External IDs: OMIM: 300553; MGI: 3029414; GeneCards: BRWD3

Gene location (Human)
| Chr. | X chromosome (human) |
| Band | Xq21.1 | Start | 80,669,503 bp |
| Band | Xq21.1 | End | 80,809,877 bp |

Gene location (Mouse)
| Chr. | X chromosome (mouse) |
| Band | X|X D | Start | 107,780,622 bp |
| Band | X|X D | End | 107,877,978 bp |
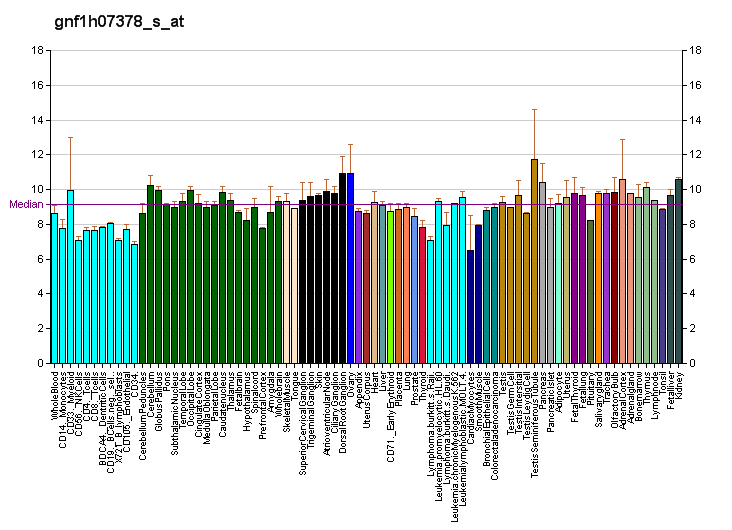

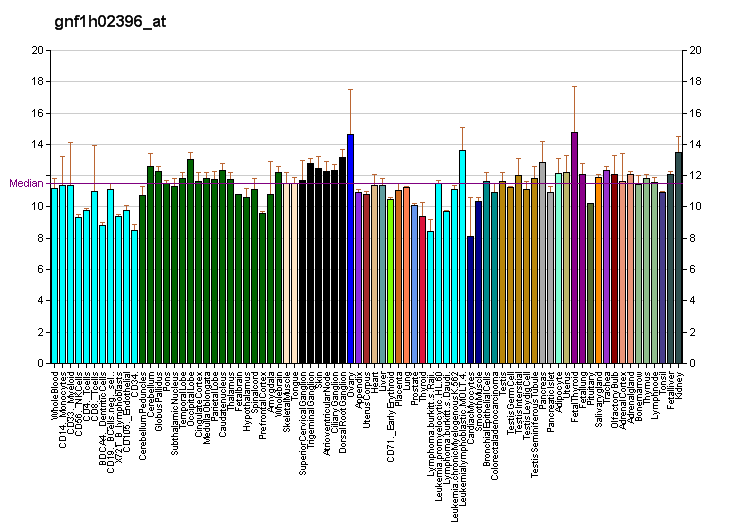

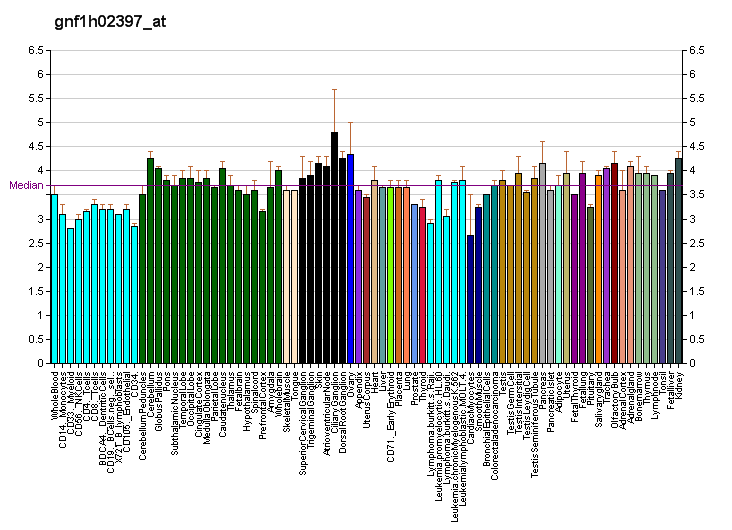
RNA expression pattern
| Bgee | Human / Mouse (ortholog); Top expressed in: tendon of biceps brachii; pancreatic epithelial cell; Achilles tendon; epithelium of colon; sural nerve; bone marrow cell; internal globus pallidus; pancreatic ductal cell; buccal mucosa cell; sperm / Top expressed in: tail of embryo; genital tubercle; utricle; Epithelium of choroid plexus; secondary oocyte; zygote; umbilical cord; pineal gland; left lung lobe; primary oocyte; More reference expression data |
| BioGPS | More reference expression data |
Orthologs
| Databases | NCBI: entry; OMA: entry |
| Species | Human | Mouse |
| Entrez | 254065 | 382236 |
| Ensembl | ENSG00000165288 | ENSMUSG00000063663 |
| UniProt | Q6RI45 | A2AHJ4 |
| RefSeq (mRNA) | NM_153252 | NM_001081477 |
| RefSeq (protein) | NP_694984 | NP_001074946 |
| Location (UCSC) | Chr X: 80.67 – 80.81 Mb | Chr X: 107.78 – 107.88 Mb |
| PubMed search |
- Wikidata
| View/Edit Human | View/Edit Mouse |

Bromodomain and WD repeat-containing protein 3 is a protein that in humans is encoded by the BRWD3 gene.

== Function ==
The protein encoded by this gene contains a bromodomain and several WD repeats. It is thought to have a chromatin-modifying function, and may thus play a role in transcription.

== Clinical significance ==
Mutations in this gene can cause intellectual disability or permanent paralysis X-linked type 93, which is also referred to as intellectual disability X-linked with macrocephaly. This gene is also associated with translocations in patients with B-cell chronic lymphocytic leukemia.
