= GNB1L =

Protein-coding gene in the species Homo sapiens

Identifiers
- Aliases: GNB1L, DGCRK3, GY2, WDR14, WDVCF, FKSG1, G protein subunit beta 1 like
- External IDs: OMIM: 610778; MGI: 1338057; GeneCards: GNB1L

Gene location (Human)
Chr.	Chromosome 22 (human)
Band	22q11.21	Start	19,783,223 bp
Band	22q11.21	End	19,854,939 bp

Gene location (Mouse)
Chr.	Chromosome 16 (mouse)
Band	16 A3|16 11.46 cM	Start	18,317,463 bp
Band	16 A3|16 11.46 cM	End	18,385,429 bp
RNA expression pattern
Bgee	Human / Mouse (ortholog); Top expressed in: gonad; stromal cell of endometrium; granulocyte; mucosa of transverse colon; testicle; prefrontal cortex; right frontal lobe; skin of leg; skin of abdomen; ventricular zone / Top expressed in: spermatocyte; spermatid; seminiferous tubule; morula; blastocyst; embryo; embryo; yolk sac; primary oocyte; lip; More reference expression data
BioGPS	n/a
Gene ontology
Molecular function	molecular function
Cellular component	cytoplasm; cytoplasmic side of plasma membrane
Biological process	social behavior; G protein-coupled receptor signaling pathway; intracellular signal transduction
Sources:Amigo / QuickGO
Orthologs
Databases	NCBI: entry; OMA: entry
Species	Human	Mouse
Entrez	54584	13972
Ensembl	ENSG00000185838	ENSMUSG00000000884
UniProt	Q9BYB4	Q9EQ15
RefSeq (mRNA)	NM_053004	NM_001081682; NM_001285491; NM_001285493; NM_001285494; NM_023120
RefSeq (protein)	NP_443730	NP_001075151; NP_001272420; NP_001272422; NP_001272423; NP_075609
Location (UCSC)	Chr 22: 19.78 – 19.85 Mb	Chr 16: 18.32 – 18.39 Mb
PubMed search
- Wikidata
View/Edit Human	View/Edit Mouse

Guanine nucleotide-binding protein subunit beta-like protein 1 is a protein that in humans is encoded by the GNB1L gene.

This gene encodes a G-protein beta-subunit-like polypeptide which is a member of the WD repeat protein family. WD repeats are minimally conserved regions of approximately 40 amino acids typically bracketed by gly-his and trp-asp (GH-WD), which may facilitate formation of heterotrimeric or multiprotein complexes. Members of this family are involved in a variety of cellular processes, including cell cycle progression, signal transduction, apoptosis, and gene regulation. This protein contains 6 WD repeats and is highly expressed in the heart. The gene maps to the region on chromosome 22q11, which is deleted in DiGeorge syndrome, trisomic in derivative 22 syndrome and tetrasomic in cat-eye syndrome. Therefore, this gene may contribute to the etiology of those disorders. Transcripts from this gene share exons with some transcripts from the C22orf29 gene.
