= WD repeat domain 76 =

Protein-coding gene in the species Homo sapiens

WDR76

Identifiers
- Aliases: WDR76, CDW14, WD repeat domain 76
- External IDs: MGI: 1926186; GeneCards: WDR76

Gene location (Human)
Chr.	Chromosome 15 (human)
Band	15q15.3	Start	43,826,980 bp
Band	15q15.3	End	43,868,412 bp

Gene location (Mouse)
Chr.	Chromosome 2 (mouse)
Band	2|2 E5	Start	121,337,204 bp
Band	2|2 E5	End	121,375,341 bp
RNA expression pattern
Bgee	Human / Mouse (ortholog); Top expressed in: oocyte; ganglionic eminence; ventricular zone; secondary oocyte; endothelial cell; testicle; gonad; Achilles tendon; bone marrow cell; stromal cell of endometrium / Top expressed in: zygote; secondary oocyte; superior cervical ganglion; primary oocyte; tail of embryo; thymus; genital tubercle; ventricular zone; epiblast; hand; More reference expression data
BioGPS	n/a
Gene ontology
Molecular function	DNA binding; protein binding; enzyme binding
Cellular component	nucleus; heterochromatin; site of DNA damage
Biological process	cellular response to DNA damage stimulus; regulation of DNA damage checkpoint
Sources:Amigo / QuickGO
Orthologs
Databases	NCBI: entry; OMA: entry
Species	Human	Mouse
Entrez	79968	241627
Ensembl	ENSG00000092470	ENSMUSG00000027242
UniProt	Q9H967	A6PWY4
RefSeq (mRNA)	NM_001167941; NM_024908	NM_001290986; NM_001290987; NM_030234; NM_001369185
RefSeq (protein)	NP_001161413; NP_079184	NP_001277915; NP_001277916; NP_084510; NP_001356114
Location (UCSC)	Chr 15: 43.83 – 43.87 Mb	Chr 2: 121.34 – 121.38 Mb
PubMed search
- Wikidata
View/Edit Human	View/Edit Mouse

WD repeat domain 76 is a protein that in humans is encoded by the WDR76 gene.
