= ZNF106 =

Protein-coding gene in the species Homo sapiens

Identifiers
- Aliases: ZNF106, SH3BP3, ZFP106, ZNF474, zinc finger protein 106
- External IDs: MGI: 1270153; GeneCards: ZNF106

Gene location (Human)
Chr.	Chromosome 15 (human)
Band	15q15.1	Start	42,412,823 bp
Band	15q15.1	End	42,491,141 bp

Gene location (Mouse)
Chr.	Chromosome 2 (mouse)
Band	2 E5|2 60.37 cM	Start	120,337,301 bp
Band	2 E5|2 60.37 cM	End	120,394,324 bp
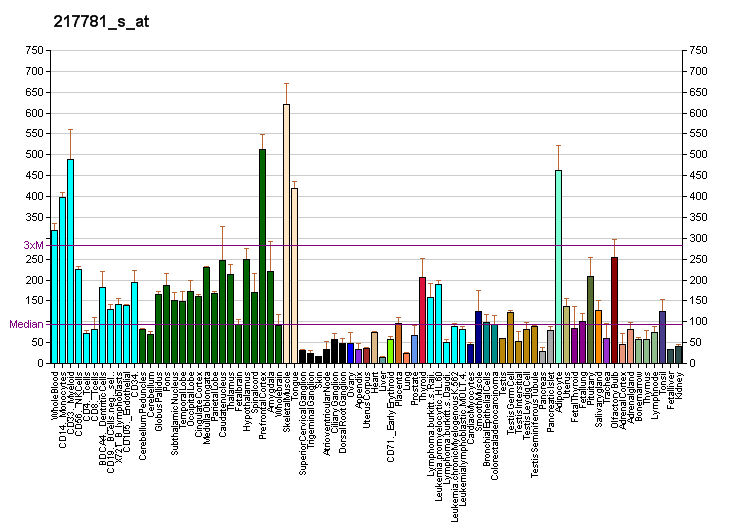
RNA expression pattern
Bgee	Human / Mouse (ortholog); Top expressed in: Skeletal muscle tissue of rectus abdominis; thoracic diaphragm; glutes; myocardium of left ventricle; Skeletal muscle tissue of biceps brachii; vastus lateralis muscle; body of tongue; deltoid muscle; right ventricle; tibialis anterior muscle / Top expressed in: ankle; digastric muscle; temporal muscle; vastus lateralis muscle; triceps brachii muscle; muscle of thigh; sternocleidomastoid muscle; tail of embryo; intercostal muscle; gastrocnemius muscle; More reference expression data
BioGPS	More reference expression data
Gene ontology
Molecular function	metal ion binding; SH3 domain binding; RNA binding; nucleic acid binding
Cellular component	nucleus; nucleolus; cytosol; membrane; nuclear speck
Biological process	insulin receptor signaling pathway
Sources:Amigo / QuickGO
Orthologs
Databases	NCBI: entry; OMA: entry
Species	Human	Mouse
Entrez	64397	20402
Ensembl	ENSG00000103994	ENSMUSG00000027288
UniProt	Q9H2Y7	O88466
RefSeq (mRNA)	NM_001284306; NM_001284307; NM_022473; NM_001366844; NM_001366845 NM_001366846; NM_001381993; NM_001381994; NM_001381995; NM_001381996; NM_001381997; NM_001381998	NM_011743; NM_009165
RefSeq (protein)	NP_001271235; NP_001271236; NP_071918; NP_001353773; NP_001353774 NP_001353775; NP_001368922; NP_001368923; NP_001368924; NP_001368925; NP_001368926; NP_001368927	NP_035873.2; NP_035873
Location (UCSC)	Chr 15: 42.41 – 42.49 Mb	Chr 2: 120.34 – 120.39 Mb
PubMed search
- Wikidata
View/Edit Human	View/Edit Mouse

Zinc finger protein 106 homolog is a protein that in humans is encoded by the ZFP106 gene.
