= WDR6 =

Protein-coding gene in the species Homo sapiens

Identifiers
- Aliases: WDR6, WD repeat domain 6, Trm734
- External IDs: OMIM: 606031; MGI: 1930140; GeneCards: WDR6

Gene location (Human)
Chr.	Chromosome 3 (human)
Band	3p21.31	Start	49,007,062 bp
Band	3p21.31	End	49,015,953 bp

Gene location (Mouse)
Chr.	Chromosome 9 (mouse)
Band	9|9 F2	Start	108,449,510 bp
Band	9|9 F2	End	108,455,938 bp
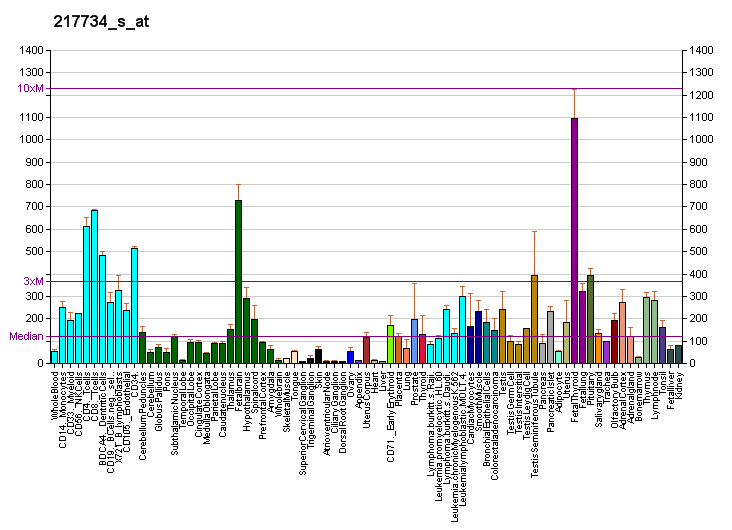
RNA expression pattern
Bgee	Human / Mouse (ortholog); Top expressed in: right uterine tube; pituitary gland; anterior pituitary; right lobe of thyroid gland; left lobe of thyroid gland; left ovary; right ovary; tendon of biceps brachii; canal of the cervix; body of uterus / Top expressed in: arcuate nucleus; ventromedial nucleus; median eminence; paraventricular nucleus of hypothalamus; dorsomedial hypothalamic nucleus; mammillary body; lateral hypothalamus; anterior amygdaloid area; lateral septal nucleus; ventral tegmental area; More reference expression data
BioGPS	More reference expression data
Gene ontology
Molecular function	protein binding; RNA binding
Cellular component	cytoplasm; COP9 signalosome; cytosol; plasma membrane
Biological process	cell cycle; negative regulation of autophagy; negative regulation of cell population proliferation
Sources:Amigo / QuickGO
Orthologs
Databases	NCBI: entry; OMA: entry
Species	Human	Mouse
Entrez	11180	83669
Ensembl	ENSG00000178252	ENSMUSG00000066357
UniProt	Q9NNW5	Q99ME2
RefSeq (mRNA)	NM_018031; NM_001320546; NM_001320547	NM_031392
RefSeq (protein)	NP_001307475; NP_001307476; NP_060501	NP_113569
Location (UCSC)	Chr 3: 49.01 – 49.02 Mb	Chr 9: 108.45 – 108.46 Mb
PubMed search
- Wikidata
View/Edit Human	View/Edit Mouse

WD repeat-containing protein 6 is a protein that in humans is encoded by the WDR6 gene.

This gene encodes a member of the WD repeat protein family. WD repeats are minimally conserved regions of approximately 40 amino acids typically bracketed by gly-his and trp-asp (GH-WD), which may facilitate formation of heterotrimeric or multiprotein complexes. Members of this family are involved in a variety of cellular processes, including cell cycle progression, signal transduction, apoptosis, and gene regulation. This gene is ubiquitously expressed in adult and fetal tissues.
