= WDR3 =

Protein-coding gene in humans

Identifiers
- Aliases: WDR3, DIP2, UTP12, WD repeat domain 3
- External IDs: OMIM: 604737; MGI: 2443143; GeneCards: WDR3

Gene location (Human)
Chr.	Chromosome 1 (human)
Band	1p12	Start	117,929,720 bp
Band	1p12	End	117,966,543 bp

Gene location (Mouse)
Chr.	Chromosome 3 (mouse)
Band	3|3 F2.2	Start	100,045,496 bp
Band	3|3 F2.2	End	100,069,723 bp
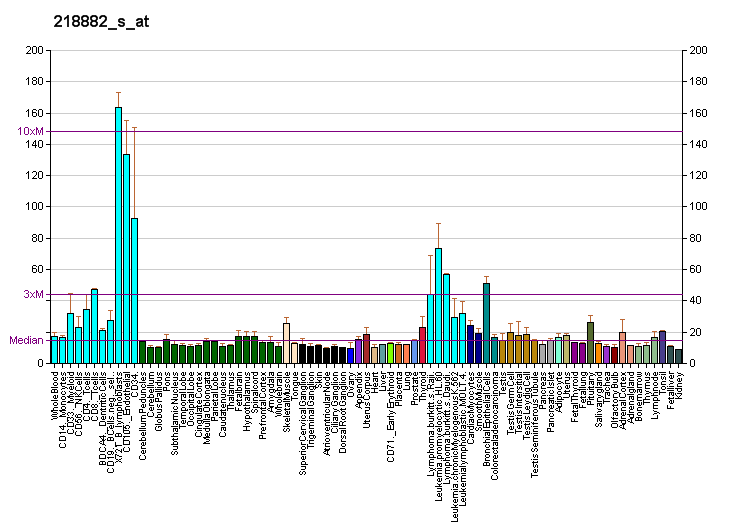
RNA expression pattern
Bgee	Human / Mouse (ortholog); Top expressed in: gingival epithelium; pancreatic ductal cell; buccal mucosa cell; parietal pleura; germinal epithelium; islet of Langerhans; visceral pleura; Epithelium of choroid plexus; epithelium of nasopharynx; hair follicle / Top expressed in: primitive streak; medullary collecting duct; hand; condyle; epiblast; fossa; superior cervical ganglion; abdominal wall; renal corpuscle; hair follicle; More reference expression data
BioGPS	More reference expression data
Gene ontology
Molecular function	snoRNA binding; RNA binding
Cellular component	Pwp2p-containing subcomplex of 90S preribosome; small-subunit processome; nuclear membrane; nucleolus; nucleoplasm; nucleus
Biological process	rRNA processing; maturation of SSU-rRNA
Sources:Amigo / QuickGO
Orthologs
Databases	NCBI: entry; OMA: entry
Species	Human	Mouse
Entrez	10885	269470
Ensembl	ENSG00000065183	ENSMUSG00000033285
UniProt	Q9UNX4	Q8BHB4
RefSeq (mRNA)	NM_006784	NM_175552; NM_001355657
RefSeq (protein)	NP_006775	NP_780761; NP_001342586
Location (UCSC)	Chr 1: 117.93 – 117.97 Mb	Chr 3: 100.05 – 100.07 Mb
PubMed search
- Wikidata
View/Edit Human	View/Edit Mouse

WD repeat-containing protein 3 is a protein that in humans is encoded by the WDR3 gene.

This gene encodes a nuclear protein containing 10 WD repeats. WD repeats are approximately 30- to 40-amino acid domains containing several conserved residues, which usually include a trp-asp at the C-terminal end. Proteins belonging to the WD repeat family are involved in a variety of cellular processes, including cell cycle progression, signal transduction, apoptosis, and gene regulation.
