= PAK1IP1 =

Protein-coding gene in the species Homo sapiens

Identifiers
- Aliases: PAK1IP1, MAK11, PIP1, WDR84, bA421M1.5, hPIP1, PAK1 interacting protein 1
- External IDs: OMIM: 607811; MGI: 1915333; GeneCards: PAK1IP1

Gene location (Human)
Chr.	Chromosome 6 (human)
Band	6p24.2	Start	10,694,972 bp
Band	6p24.2	End	10,709,782 bp

Gene location (Mouse)
Chr.	Chromosome 13 (mouse)
Band	13|13 A3.3	Start	41,154,499 bp
Band	13|13 A3.3	End	41,166,491 bp
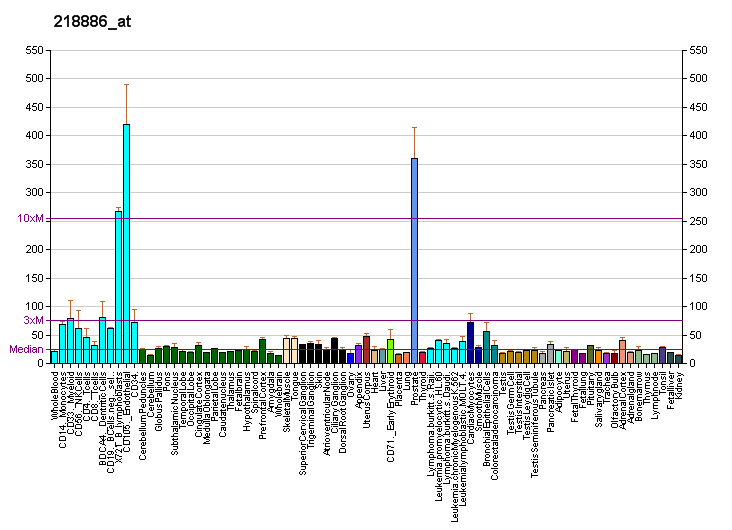
RNA expression pattern
Bgee	Human / Mouse (ortholog); Top expressed in: prostate; Achilles tendon; endometrium; islet of Langerhans; mucosa of esophagus; gonad; smooth muscle tissue; gastrocnemius muscle; monocyte; rectum / Top expressed in: primary oocyte; transitional epithelium of urinary bladder; otic placode; epiblast; morula; morula; maxillary prominence; saccule; mandibular prominence; otic vesicle; More reference expression data
BioGPS	More reference expression data
Gene ontology
Molecular function	protein binding
Cellular component	nucleolus; nucleus
Biological process	roof of mouth development; negative regulation of signal transduction; cell population proliferation; ribosomal large subunit biogenesis; regulation of signal transduction by p53 class mediator; ribosome biogenesis
Sources:Amigo / QuickGO
Orthologs
Databases	NCBI: entry; OMA: entry
Species	Human	Mouse
Entrez	55003	68083
Ensembl	ENSG00000111845; ENSG00000285226	ENSMUSG00000038683
UniProt	Q9NWT1	Q9DCE5
RefSeq (mRNA)	NM_017906	NM_026550
RefSeq (protein)	NP_060376	NP_080826
Location (UCSC)	Chr 6: 10.69 – 10.71 Mb	Chr 13: 41.15 – 41.17 Mb
PubMed search
- Wikidata
View/Edit Human	View/Edit Mouse

p21-activated protein kinase-interacting protein 1 is an enzyme that in humans is encoded by the PAK1IP1 gene.

== Interactions ==
PAK1IP1 has been shown to interact with PAK1.
