= WDR44 =

Protein-coding gene in the species Homo sapiens

Identifiers
- Aliases: WDR44, RAB11BP, RPH11, WD repeat domain 44, SYM-4
- External IDs: MGI: 1919654; GeneCards: WDR44

Gene location (Human)
Chr.	X chromosome (human)
Band	Xq24	Start	118,346,073 bp
Band	Xq24	End	118,449,961 bp

Gene location (Mouse)
Chr.	X chromosome (mouse)
Band	X|X A2	Start	23,559,290 bp
Band	X|X A2	End	23,672,264 bp
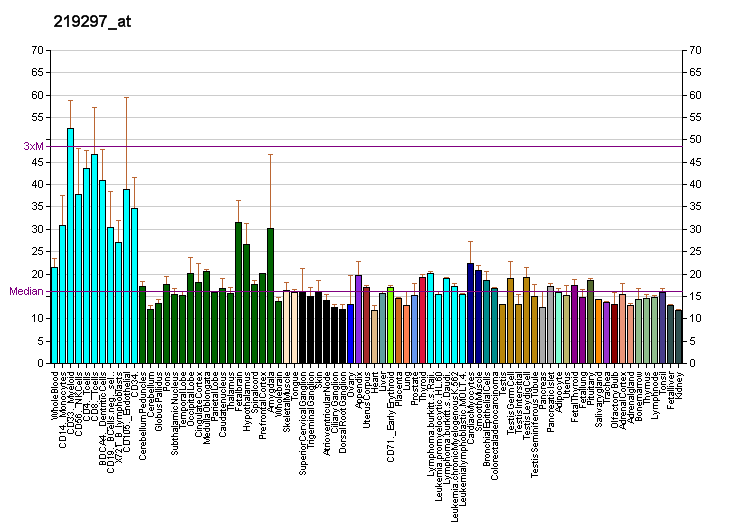
RNA expression pattern
Bgee	Human / Mouse (ortholog); Top expressed in: buccal mucosa cell; Achilles tendon; tendon of biceps brachii; corpus callosum; testicle; germinal epithelium; gingival epithelium; endothelial cell; internal globus pallidus; tibia / Top expressed in: lumbar spinal ganglion; aortic valve; ascending aorta; muscle of thigh; epithelium of small intestine; triceps brachii muscle; temporal muscle; vastus lateralis muscle; blood; granulocyte; More reference expression data
BioGPS	More reference expression data
Orthologs
Databases	NCBI: entry; OMA: entry
Species	Human	Mouse
Entrez	54521	72404
Ensembl	ENSG00000131725	ENSMUSG00000036769
UniProt	Q5JSH3	Q6NVE8
RefSeq (mRNA)	NM_001184965; NM_001184966; NM_019045	NM_175180; NM_001305675
RefSeq (protein)	NP_001171894; NP_001171895; NP_061918	NP_001292604; NP_780389
Location (UCSC)	Chr X: 118.35 – 118.45 Mb	Chr X: 23.56 – 23.67 Mb
PubMed search
- Wikidata
View/Edit Human	View/Edit Mouse

WD repeat-containing protein 44 is a protein that in humans is encoded by the WDR44 gene.
