= PAAF1 =

Protein-coding gene in the species Homo sapiens

Identifiers
- Aliases: PAAF1, PAAF, Rpn14, WDR71, proteasomal ATPase associated factor 1
- External IDs: GeneCards: PAAF1

Gene location (Human)
Chr.	Chromosome 11 (human)
Band	11q13.4	Start	73,876,699 bp
Band	11q13.4	End	73,931,114 bp
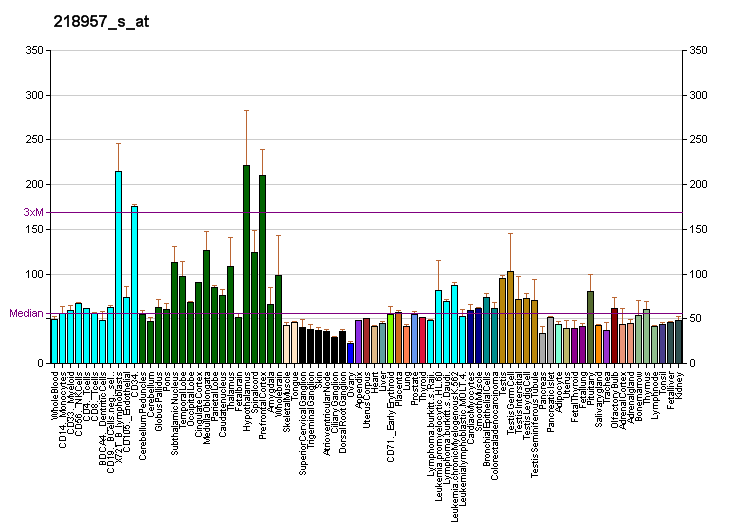
RNA expression pattern
Bgee	Human / Mouse (ortholog); Top expressed in: C1 segment; substantia nigra; internal globus pallidus; amygdala; external globus pallidus; putamen; pars reticulata; nucleus accumbens; inferior olivary nucleus; caudate nucleus / n/a; More reference expression data
BioGPS	More reference expression data
Gene ontology
Molecular function	protein binding
Cellular component	proteasome complex
Biological process	viral process
Sources:Amigo / QuickGO
Orthologs
Databases	NCBI: entry; OMA: entry
Species	Human	Mouse
Entrez	80227	n/a
Ensembl	ENSG00000175575	n/a
UniProt	Q9BRP4	n/a
RefSeq (mRNA)	NM_001267803; NM_001267804; NM_001267805; NM_001267806; NM_025155 NM_001363556	n/a
RefSeq (protein)	NP_001254732; NP_001254733; NP_001254734; NP_001254735; NP_079431 NP_001350485	n/a
Location (UCSC)	Chr 11: 73.88 – 73.93 Mb	n/a
PubMed search		n/a
- Wikidata
View/Edit Human

Proteasomal ATPase-associated factor 1 is an enzyme that in humans is encoded by the PAAF1 gene.

== Interactions ==
PAAF1 has been shown to interact with PSMD10.
