= FBXW4 =

Protein-coding gene in the species Homo sapiens

Identifiers
- Aliases: FBXW4, DAC, FBW4, FBWD4, SHFM3, SHSF3, F-box and WD repeat domain containing 4
- External IDs: OMIM: 608071; MGI: 1354698; GeneCards: FBXW4

Gene location (Human)
Chr.	Chromosome 10 (human)
Band	10q24.32	Start	101,610,664 bp
Band	10q24.32	End	101,695,295 bp

Gene location (Mouse)
Chr.	Chromosome 19 (mouse)
Band	19 C3|19 38.75 cM	Start	45,566,693 bp
Band	19 C3|19 38.75 cM	End	45,648,751 bp
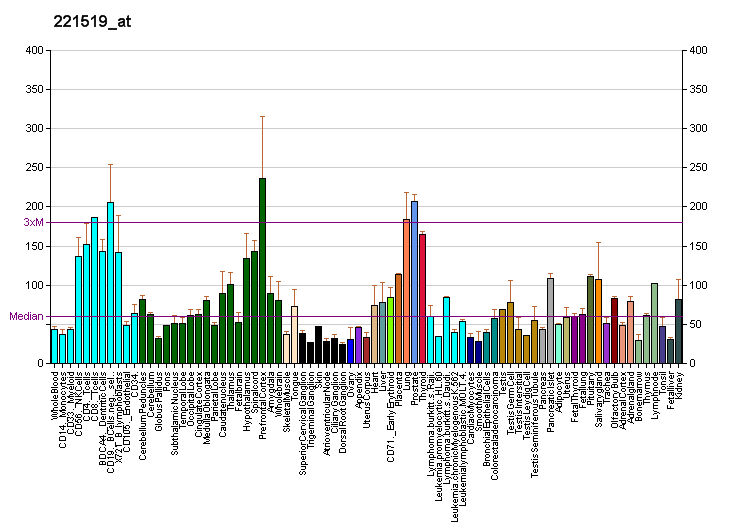
RNA expression pattern
Bgee	Human / Mouse (ortholog); Top expressed in: C1 segment; apex of heart; amygdala; putamen; inferior ganglion of vagus nerve; muscle layer of sigmoid colon; gastrocnemius muscle; muscle of thigh; subthalamic nucleus; gastric mucosa / Top expressed in: secondary oocyte; primary oocyte; zygote; retinal pigment epithelium; granulocyte; choroid plexus of fourth ventricle; muscle of thigh; neural layer of retina; superior frontal gyrus; dentate gyrus of hippocampal formation granule cell; More reference expression data
BioGPS	More reference expression data
Gene ontology
Molecular function	ubiquitin-protein transferase activity; protein binding; molecular function
Cellular component	ubiquitin ligase complex; cytosol; SCF ubiquitin ligase complex
Biological process	multicellular organism development; embryonic digit morphogenesis; cartilage development; positive regulation of mesenchymal cell proliferation; Wnt signaling pathway; embryonic limb morphogenesis; ubiquitin-dependent protein catabolic process; limb development; protein polyubiquitination; SCF-dependent proteasomal ubiquitin-dependent protein catabolic process; post-translational protein modification
Sources:Amigo / QuickGO
Orthologs
Databases	NCBI: entry; OMA: entry
Species	Human	Mouse
Entrez	6468	30838
Ensembl	ENSG00000107829	ENSMUSG00000040913
UniProt	P57775	Q9JMJ2
RefSeq (mRNA)	NM_022039; NM_001323541	NM_013907
RefSeq (protein)	NP_001310470; NP_071322	NP_038935
Location (UCSC)	Chr 10: 101.61 – 101.7 Mb	Chr 19: 45.57 – 45.65 Mb
PubMed search
- Wikidata
View/Edit Human	View/Edit Mouse

F-box/WD repeat-containing protein 4 is a protein that in humans is encoded by the FBXW4 gene.

This gene is a member of the F-box/WD-40 gene family, which recruit specific target proteins through their WD-40 protein-protein binding domains for ubiquitin mediated degradation. In mouse, a highly similar protein is thought to be responsible for maintaining the apical ectodermal ridge of developing limb buds; disruption of the mouse gene results in the absence of central digits, underdeveloped or absent metacarpal/metatarsal bones and syndactyly. This phenotype is remarkably similar to split hand-split foot malformation in humans, a clinically heterogeneous condition with a variety of modes of transmission. An autosomal recessive form has been mapped to the chromosomal region where this gene is located, and complex rearrangements involving duplications of this gene and others have been associated with the condition. A pseudogene of this locus has been mapped to one of the introns of the BCR gene on chromosome 22.
