= NLE1 =

Protein-coding gene in the species Homo sapiens

Identifiers
- Aliases: NLE1, Nle, notchless homolog 1
- External IDs: MGI: 2429770; GeneCards: NLE1

Gene location (Human)
Chr.	Chromosome 17 (human)
Band	17q12	Start	35,128,730 bp
Band	17q12	End	35,142,304 bp

Gene location (Mouse)
Chr.	Chromosome 11 (mouse)
Band	11|11 C	Start	82,791,594 bp
Band	11|11 C	End	82,799,237 bp
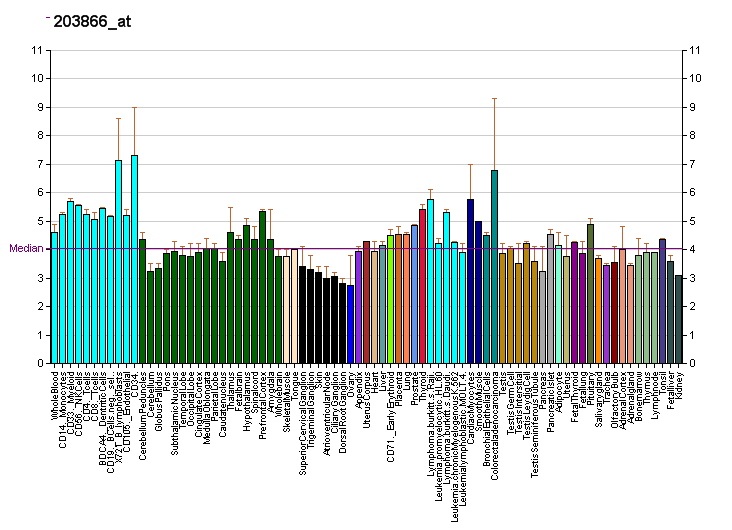

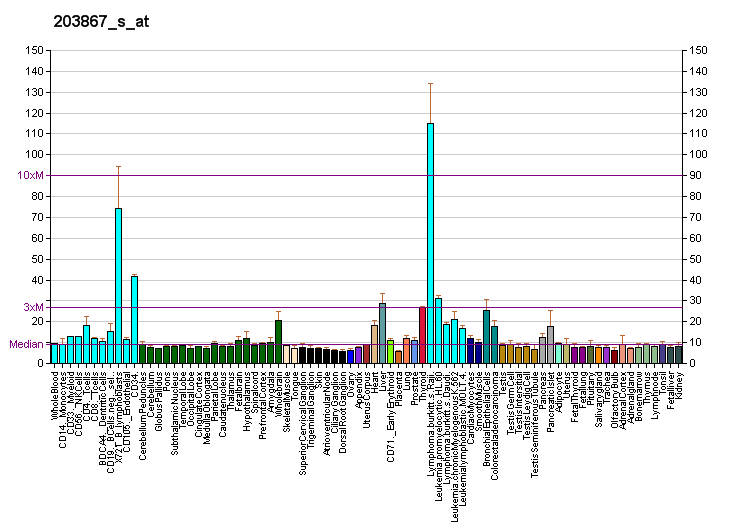
RNA expression pattern
Bgee	Human / Mouse (ortholog); Top expressed in: gonad; body of pancreas; ganglionic eminence; ventricular zone; stromal cell of endometrium; left ovary; prefrontal cortex; muscle of thigh; gastrocnemius muscle; right ovary / Top expressed in: morula; yolk sac; epiblast; embryo; neural layer of retina; ventricular zone; blastocyst; muscle of thigh; embryo; lip; More reference expression data
BioGPS	More reference expression data
Orthologs
Databases	NCBI: entry; OMA: entry
Species	Human	Mouse
Entrez	54475	217011
Ensembl	ENSG00000073536	ENSMUSG00000020692
UniProt	Q9NVX2	Q8VEJ4
RefSeq (mRNA)	NM_001014445; NM_018096	NM_145431
RefSeq (protein)	NP_001014445; NP_060566	NP_663406
Location (UCSC)	Chr 17: 35.13 – 35.14 Mb	Chr 11: 82.79 – 82.8 Mb
PubMed search
- Wikidata
View/Edit Human	View/Edit Mouse

Notchless protein homolog 1 is a protein that in humans is encoded by the NLE1 gene.
