= DCAF7 =

Protein-coding gene in the species Homo sapiens

Identifiers
- Aliases: DCAF7, AN11, HAN11, SWAN-1, WDR68, DDB1 and CUL4 associated factor 7
- External IDs: OMIM: 605973; MGI: 1919083; GeneCards: DCAF7

Gene location (Mouse)
Chr.	Chromosome 11 (mouse)
Band	11|11 E1	Start	105,927,698 bp
Band	11|11 E1	End	105,950,150 bp
RNA expression pattern
Bgee	Human / Mouse (ortholog); Top expressed in: ganglionic eminence; oocyte; secondary oocyte; renal medulla; cardia; trabecular bone; lower lobe of lung; ventral tegmental area; inferior ganglion of vagus nerve; subthalamic nucleus / Top expressed in: superior cervical ganglion; otolith organ; utricle; hand; Paneth cell; subiculum; trigeminal ganglion; anterior amygdaloid area; paraventricular nucleus of hypothalamus; arcuate nucleus; More reference expression data
BioGPS	n/a
Gene ontology
Molecular function	protein binding
Cellular component	nuclear matrix; Cul4-RING E3 ubiquitin ligase complex; nucleus; cytoplasm; cytosol; nuclear body; nucleoplasm; protein-containing complex
Biological process	multicellular organism development; post-translational protein modification; protein ubiquitination
Sources:Amigo / QuickGO
Orthologs
Databases	NCBI: entry
Species	Human	Mouse
Entrez	10238	71833
Ensembl	n/a	ENSMUSG00000049354
UniProt	P61962	P61963
RefSeq (mRNA)	NM_001003725; NM_005828	NM_027946
RefSeq (protein)	NP_005819	NP_082222
Location (UCSC)	n/a	Chr 11: 105.93 – 105.95 Mb
PubMed search
- Wikidata
View/Edit Human	View/Edit Mouse

DDB1- and CUL4-associated factor 7 is a protein that in humans is encoded by the DCAF7 gene. This protein may function as a substrate receptor for the CUL4-DDB1 complex, which functions as an E3 ubiquitin ligase.

== Interactions ==
DCAF7 has been shown to interact with DYRK1A.
