= FBXW10 =

Protein-coding gene in the species Homo sapiens

Identifiers
- Aliases: FBXW10, Fbw10, HREP, SM25H2, SM2SH2, F-box and WD repeat domain containing 10
- External IDs: OMIM: 611679; MGI: 3052463; GeneCards: FBXW10

Gene location (Human)
Chr.	Chromosome 17 (human)
Band	17p11.2	Start	18,744,026 bp
Band	17p11.2	End	18,779,349 bp

Gene location (Mouse)
Chr.	Chromosome 11 (mouse)
Band	11|11 B2	Start	62,737,895 bp
Band	11|11 B2	End	62,768,291 bp
RNA expression pattern
Bgee	Human / Mouse (ortholog); Top expressed in: testicle; left testis; right testis; olfactory zone of nasal mucosa; right uterine tube; right adrenal cortex; cerebellar hemisphere; right hemisphere of cerebellum; right lobe of liver; gastrocnemius muscle / Top expressed in: seminiferous tubule; spermatid; spermatocyte; embryo; zygote; secondary oocyte; embryo; thymus; primary oocyte; visual cortex; More reference expression data
BioGPS	n/a
Gene ontology
Molecular function	ubiquitin-protein transferase activity
Cellular component	cytosol
Biological process	protein polyubiquitination; post-translational protein modification
Sources:Amigo / QuickGO
Orthologs
Databases	NCBI: entry; OMA: entry
Species	Human	Mouse
Entrez	10517	213980
Ensembl	ENSG00000171931	ENSMUSG00000090173
UniProt	Q5XX13	Q5SUS0
RefSeq (mRNA)	NM_001267585; NM_001267586; NM_031456	NM_001033669; NM_001291441
RefSeq (protein)	NP_001254514; NP_001254515	NP_001028841; NP_001278370; NP_001391704; NP_001391705; NP_001391706 NP_001391707
Location (UCSC)	Chr 17: 18.74 – 18.78 Mb	Chr 11: 62.74 – 62.77 Mb
PubMed search
- Wikidata
View/Edit Human	View/Edit Mouse

F-box/WD repeat-containing protein 10 is a protein that in humans is encoded by the FBXW10 gene.

Members of the F-box protein family, such as FBXW10, are characterized by an approximately 40-amino acid F-box motif. SCF complexes, formed by SKP1 (MIM 601434), cullin (see CUL1; MIM 603034), and F-box proteins, act as protein-ubiquitin ligases. F-box proteins interact with SKP1 through the F box, and they interact with ubiquitination targets through other protein interaction domains (Jin et al., 2004).[supplied by OMIM] Increased expression of the gene has been associated with laminopathies, and in degradation of chromatin associated proteins such as HP1, ATR kinases (Chaturvedi and ParnaiK, 2010, PMID 20498703).
