= WDR37 =

Protein-coding gene in the species Homo sapiens

Identifiers
- Aliases: WDR37, WD repeat domain 37, NOCGUS
- External IDs: MGI: 1920393; GeneCards: WDR37

Gene location (Human)
Chr.	Chromosome 10 (human)
Band	10p15.3	Start	1,049,538 bp
Band	10p15.3	End	1,132,384 bp

Gene location (Mouse)
Chr.	Chromosome 13 (mouse)
Band	13|13 A1	Start	8,853,004 bp
Band	13|13 A1	End	8,921,945 bp
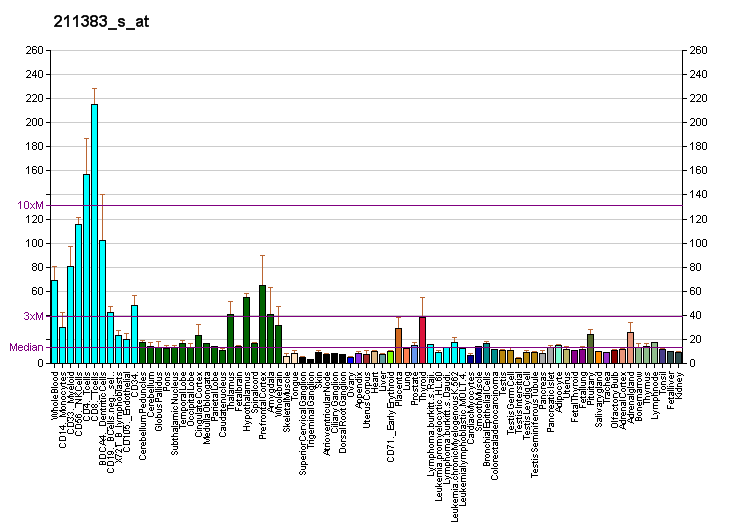
RNA expression pattern
Bgee	Human / Mouse (ortholog); Top expressed in: secondary oocyte; tibia; middle temporal gyrus; parietal pleura; tendon of biceps brachii; granulocyte; amniotic fluid; tibialis anterior muscle; Brodmann area 23; internal globus pallidus / Top expressed in: superior cervical ganglion; zygote; hand; otolith organ; secondary oocyte; utricle; spermatid; interventricular septum; retinal pigment epithelium; dentate gyrus of hippocampal formation granule cell; More reference expression data
BioGPS	More reference expression data
Orthologs
Databases	NCBI: entry; OMA: entry
Species	Human	Mouse
Entrez	22884	207615
Ensembl	ENSG00000047056	ENSMUSG00000021147
UniProt	Q9Y2I8	Q8CBE3
RefSeq (mRNA)	NM_014023	NM_001039388; NM_001039389; NM_172445
RefSeq (protein)	NP_054742	NP_001034477; NP_001034478; NP_766033
Location (UCSC)	Chr 10: 1.05 – 1.13 Mb	Chr 13: 8.85 – 8.92 Mb
PubMed search
- Wikidata
View/Edit Human	View/Edit Mouse

WD repeat-containing protein 37 is a protein that in humans is encoded by the WDR37 gene.

This gene encodes a member of the WD repeat protein family. WD repeats are minimally conserved regions of approximately 40 amino acids typically bracketed by gly-his and trp-asp (GH-WD), which may facilitate formation of heterotrimeric or multiprotein complexes. Members of this family are involved in a variety of cellular processes, including cell cycle progression, signal transduction, apoptosis, and gene regulation.

== Clinical ==
Mutations in this gene have been linked to a number of lesions in humans. These include

- Corneal opacity/Peters anomaly
- Coloboma
- Microcornea
- Cerebellar hypoplasia
- Epilepsy
- Dysmorphic facial features
- Variable skeletal, cardiac and genitourinary defects
- Significant neurological impairment with structural brain defects and seizures
- Poor feeding
- Poor post-natal growth
- Death in infancy
