= CIAO1 =

Protein-coding gene in humans

Identifiers
- Aliases: CIAO1, CIA1, WDR39, cytosolic iron-sulfur assembly component 1
- External IDs: OMIM: 604333; MGI: 1346998; GeneCards: CIAO1
Available structures
PDB	Ortholog search: PDBe RCSB
PDB	List of PDB id codes 3FM0

Gene location (Human)
Chr.	Chromosome 2 (human)
Band	2q11.2	Start	96,266,159 bp
Band	2q11.2	End	96,274,173 bp

Gene location (Mouse)
Chr.	Chromosome 2 (mouse)
Band	2 F1|2 61.86 cM	Start	127,082,858 bp
Band	2 F1|2 61.86 cM	End	127,089,736 bp
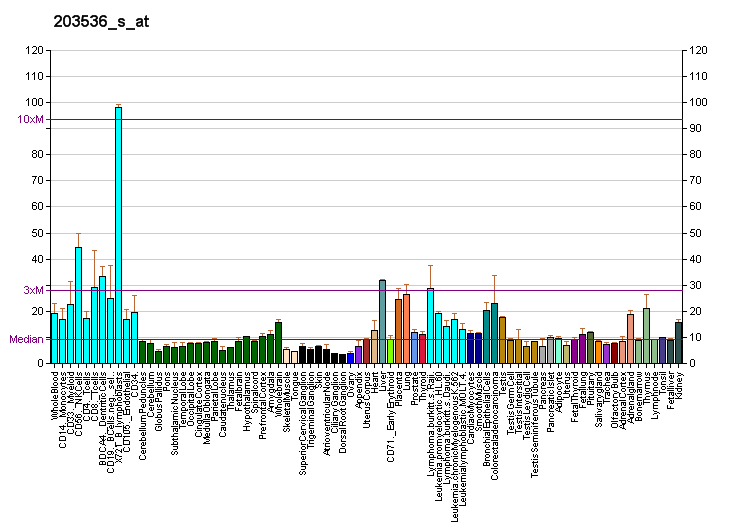

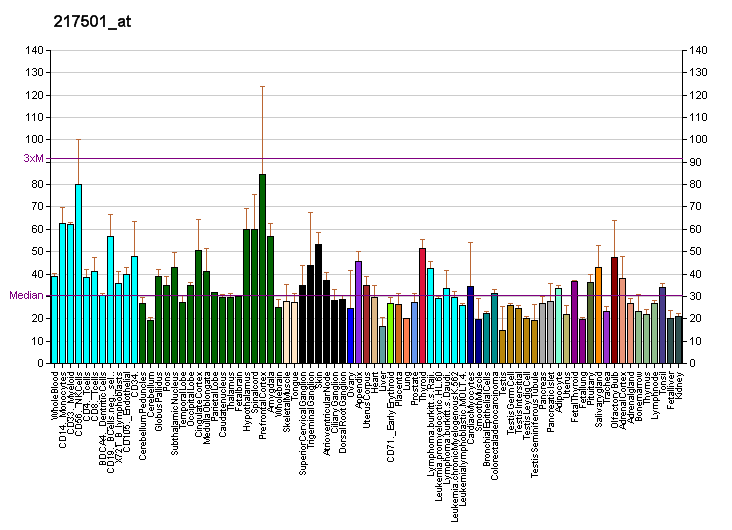
RNA expression pattern
Bgee	Human / Mouse (ortholog); Top expressed in: right adrenal cortex; left adrenal cortex; granulocyte; ganglionic eminence; cerebellar hemisphere; ventricular zone; body of pancreas; right frontal lobe; putamen; nucleus accumbens / Top expressed in: right ventricle; right kidney; muscle of thigh; interventricular septum; medial ganglionic eminence; dentate gyrus of hippocampal formation granule cell; human kidney; lip; adrenal gland; seminal vesicula; More reference expression data
BioGPS	More reference expression data
Gene ontology
Molecular function	protein binding
Cellular component	CIA complex; MMXD complex; cytoplasm
Biological process	regulation of transcription by RNA polymerase II; iron-sulfur cluster assembly; positive regulation of cell population proliferation; chromosome segregation; protein maturation by iron-sulfur cluster transfer
Sources:Amigo / QuickGO
Orthologs
Databases	NCBI: entry; OMA: entry
Species	Human	Mouse
Entrez	9391	26371
Ensembl	ENSG00000144021	ENSMUSG00000003662
UniProt	O76071	Q99KN2
RefSeq (mRNA)	NM_004804	NM_025296
RefSeq (protein)	NP_004795	NP_079572
Location (UCSC)	Chr 2: 96.27 – 96.27 Mb	Chr 2: 127.08 – 127.09 Mb
PubMed search
- Wikidata
View/Edit Human	View/Edit Mouse

Probable cytosolic iron-sulfur protein assembly protein CIAO1 is a protein that in humans is encoded by the CIAO1 gene. CIAO1 forms a complex with FAM96B, MMS19, the co-chaperone HSC20 and the scaffold protein ISCU in order to assist iron-sulfur cluster incorporation into cytoplasmic and nuclear iron-sulfur proteins.
