= WDR46 =

Protein-coding gene in the species Homo sapiens

Identifiers
- Aliases: WDR46, BING4, C6orf11, FP221, UTP7, WD repeat domain 46
- External IDs: OMIM: 611440; MGI: 1931871; GeneCards: WDR46

Gene location (Human)
Chr.	Chromosome 6 (human)
Band	6p21.32	Start	33,279,108 bp
Band	6p21.32	End	33,289,247 bp

Gene location (Mouse)
Chr.	Chromosome 17 (mouse)
Band	17|17 B1	Start	34,159,634 bp
Band	17|17 B1	End	34,168,671 bp
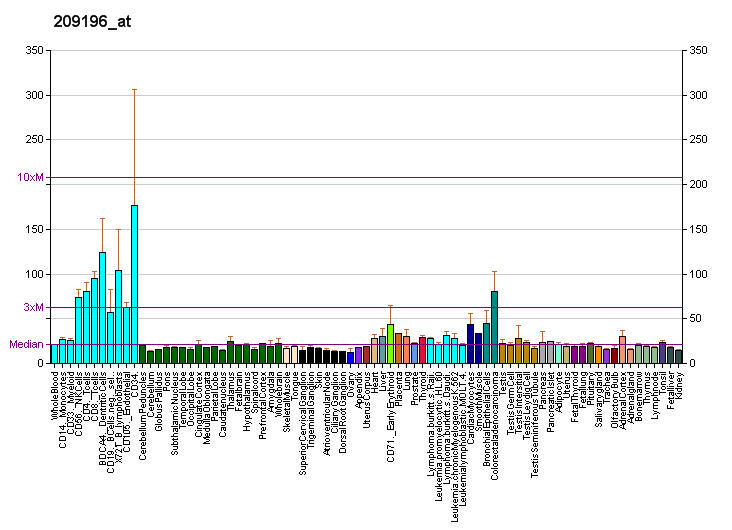
RNA expression pattern
Bgee	Human / Mouse (ortholog); Top expressed in: granulocyte; stromal cell of endometrium; anterior pituitary; mucosa of transverse colon; spleen; appendix; left testis; skin of leg; apex of heart; right lobe of thyroid gland / Top expressed in: Gonadal ridge; epiblast; submandibular gland; gastrula; abdominal wall; hair follicle; mandibular prominence; Paneth cell; primitive streak; maxillary prominence; More reference expression data
BioGPS	More reference expression data
Gene ontology
Molecular function	RNA binding
Cellular component	small-subunit processome; nucleolus; 90S preribosome; nucleus; nucleoplasm; cellular component
Biological process	maturation of SSU-rRNA from tricistronic rRNA transcript (SSU-rRNA, 5.8S rRNA, LSU-rRNA); positive regulation of protein targeting to mitochondrion; rRNA processing
Sources:Amigo / QuickGO
Orthologs
Databases	NCBI: entry; OMA: entry
Species	Human	Mouse
Entrez	9277	57315
Ensembl	ENSG00000206284; ENSG00000236222; ENSG00000204221; ENSG00000226916; ENSG00000227057 n/a	ENSMUSG00000024312
UniProt	O15213	Q9Z0H1
RefSeq (mRNA)	NM_001164267; NM_005452	NM_020603
RefSeq (protein)	NP_001157739; NP_005443	NP_065628
Location (UCSC)	Chr 6: 33.28 – 33.29 Mb	Chr 17: 34.16 – 34.17 Mb
PubMed search
- Wikidata
View/Edit Human	View/Edit Mouse

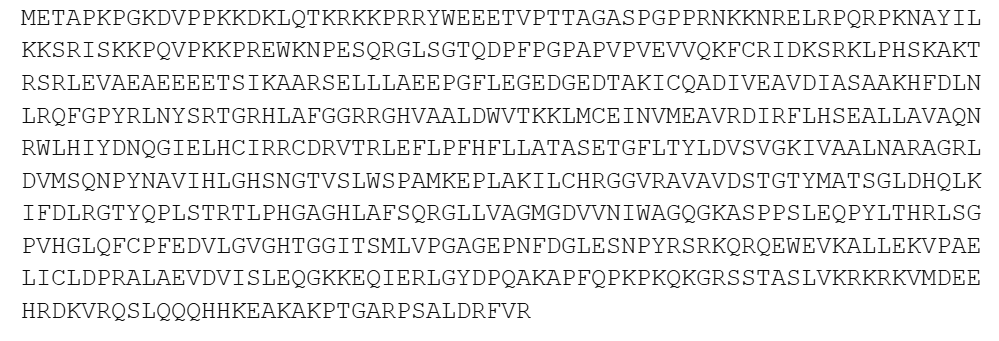
Sequence for WDR46

WD repeat-containing protein 46 also known as WD repeat-containing protein BING4 is a protein that in humans is encoded by the WDR46 gene. The name is due to the 6 WD repeats it contains. It is classified as an essential and plasma protein.

== Evolutionary conservation ==
The WDR46 protein is part of the WD-repeat proteins that are a large ancient group of regulatory proteins found in all eukaryotes. Although WDR46 is not necessarily found in all eukaryotes, some species it can be found in are humans (Homo sapiens) on chromosome 6, mice (Mus musculus) on chromosome 17, rats (Rattus norvegicus) on chromosome 20, the African clawed frog (Xenopus laevis), Western clawed frog (Xenopus tropicalis), Zebrafish (Danio rerio) on chromosome 8, the common fruit fly (Drosophila melanogaster), roundworm (Caenorhabditis elegans), and Brewer's yeast (Saccharomyces cerevisiae S288C). However it has no known orthologies so far in other eukaryotic species thus far. The WD-repeat proteins are defined by repeating units and typically end in a Trp-Asp or WD sequence that form a stable scaffold for protein to protein interactions. They can play critical roles in cell division, signal transduction, and transcription regulation. This protein in particular aids in maintaining a stable scaffold for proteins and aids other proteins cell division.

== Tissue distribution ==
The protein is commonly found in the human appendix as well as found in adrenal gland, brain (whole and cerebellum), heart, kidney, liver, lung, placenta, prostate, salivary gland, skeletal muscle, small intestine, spleen, stomach, thymus, thyroid, trachea, and uterus. Also present in human fetal tissue heart, stomach, lung, brain, and kidney samples. The gene has low tissue specificity with a non-specific expression cluster that is mostly in transcription. However, in RNA expression, its single cell type specificity is in early spermatids and oocytes with its expression cluster being in spermiogensis in the acrosomal phase. The Human Protein Atlas lists WDR46 as a "prognostic marker in Liver hepatocellular carcinoma"; however, studies showing such claims are limited. The protein is able to be detected in blood by mass spectrometry. Its concentrations are highest in blood.

== Subcellular localization ==
It has been found in cell line studies involving CRISPR. On a cellular level, it is located intracellularly in the nucleolus and nucleoplasm. Its genomic coordinates are 6:33,279,108–33,289,239. It is a nuclear scaffold protein that is highly insoluble.

== Structure ==
The protein is 610 amino acids long and its mass is 68,071 Da. The gene comprises 11 exons. The predicted protein sequence contains a class I aminoacyl-tRNA synthetase adenylate binding site motif which is a characteristic of the most common Fold Type I PLP-dependent enzymes. It is defined by a highly conserved sequence that includes a lysine residue that forms a Schiff base with the cofactor. The protein also has sites for N-glycosylation, phosphorylation, myristoylation, and amidation. The estimated fold energy for the protein's region 5' is -17.30 kcal/mol while the estimated fold energy for the protein's region 3' is -65.50 kcal/mol. The gene has 2 protein coding transcripts and interacts with 9 proteins.

The protein structure is quite large composing of antiparallel beta sheets and alpha helices. The protein is globular in nature.

== Function ==
The protein WDR46 plays a central part in the scaffold component of nucleolar structure. It localizes primarily in the granular component of the nucleolus which is mostly composed of nearly completed preribosomal subunits or ribonucleoprotein particles made up of assembled rRNA and ribosomal proteins. The region is associated with late rRNA processing and assembly events. WDR46 is a fundamental component of maintaining the shape of the nuclear scaffold which is an insoluble structure that contributes to organization within the nucleus. A special aspect of this protein is that it does not depend on DNA or RNA to localize to the nucleolus. Rather, its ability to do so is actually likely because of its intrinsically disordered N- and C-terminal regions. These terminal regions also help WDR46 bind with its binding partners. Some of the binding partners of WDR46 participate in the 18S ribosomal RNA processing machinery. Studies found that after knocking down WDR46, the binding agents involved in the organization of 18S ribosomal RNA processing machinery were also mislocalized from their granular component, to the edges of the nucleoli. Researchers concluded that WDR46 allows for the proper recruitment of nucleolin and DDX21 to the nucleoli in daughter cells after cell division ensuring the proper organization of 18S ribosomal RNA processing.

Also the studies show evidence of WDR46 involvement in the assembly of SSU processome located in the nucleolus working with ribosome biogenesis factors, an RNA chaperone, and other ribosomal proteins. These factors all participate with pre-rRNA and work together to facilitate the formation and folding of RNA. WDR46 also aids in modifications, rearrangements, and cleavage of RNA and participates in the RNA quality control system by assisting the RNA exosome to perform targeted degradation of pre-ribosomal RNA.

Pathways in processing include metabolism from RNA, rRNA processing and modification in nucleus and cytosol.

Also predicted to be involved in the maturation of SSU-rRNA from tricistronic rRNA transcript. SSU-rRNA stands for small subunit ribosomal RNA and is involved in mRNA during translation making it a crucial part of protein synthesis. The protein is likely part of a small subunit processome.

WDR46 in mice has a predicted similar function in mice compared to humans. It is predicted to be involved in the maturation of SSU-rRNA from tricistronic rRNA transcript. It is expressed in many mice structures such as the central nervous system, genitourinary system, hemolymphoid system, liver, and retina. The predicted locations and functions are also similar to that of humans. It is likely located in the nucleolus and part of a small-subunit processome. The WDR46 domains in mice also aid the folding of nucleic structures which aid in the binding of DNA and other proteins.

The WDR46 protein has marker relationships with other genes, various DNA, and cDNA sequences in Zebrafish. These markers that WDR46 is contained in are BAC DKEYP-87A12 and Fosmid CH1073-429L10. While the markers that WDR46 encodes for in Zebrafish are EST tdsubc_2d4 and cDNA MGC:63793.

== Disease, variants, and mutations ==
There are three potential isoforms for this protein. These variants were likely made in the lab due to alternative splicing.

Studies show two splice variants: WDR46-231 ENSP00000363746 ENST00000374617 and WDR46-232 ENSP00000405568 ENST00000444176.

Mutation information on the WDR46 gene is available for Zebrafish (Danio rerio). The four known variants are allele hi1451Tg which is a transgenic insertion mutation while the other variants in alleles sa27295, sa38222, and sa38223 are all alleles with a single point mutation. DNA was used as the mutagen to create the hi1451Tg mutation while ENU were used as the mutagen to create the other mutations. The consequence of the single point mutations on the transcript resulted in a splice site.

WDR46 in rats is directly linked to be a marker for disease progression and stomach neoplasms.

== Clinical significance ==
Herberg et al. had a study where they identified part of the WDR46 which they called BING1. They found this when analyzing a 70-kbp region of DNA surrounding the TAPASIN gene, which is important for presenting antigens via MHC class I molecules. This region is known to be linked to several diseases and developmental differences in mice. The TAPASIN gene is nearby the WDR46 gene. In this segment, they identified and characterized seven additional genes: BING1: Encodes a zinc-finger protein with a POZ domain. BING3: Resembles a myosin regulatory light chain. BING4: Similar only to predicted proteins from yeast and C. elegans. BING5: Located inside a BING4 intron on the opposite DNA strand; has no known protein similarities. RGL2: A Ras-effector similar to mouse RalGDS (Rlf). DAXX (BING2): A Fas-effector involved in JNK-mediated apoptosis; of interest because apoptosis and MHC genes are linked to autoimmune diseases. HKE2: Identified but not fully characterized previously.

Rosenburg et al. found the length of the protein and an alternative reading frame. Semiquantitative RT-PCR analysis found that 8 out of 15 melanoma cells were found to overexpress BING4 (also known as WDR46) while nonmelanoma cells and normal tissue did not have this feature. The cell line overexpression correlated with lymphocyte recognition, suggesting that immune cells can recognize and attack cells when BING4 expression is above a certain threshold. In other words, the patient's immune cells could "see" and kill melanoma cells that displayed this peptide. BING4 could act as a melanoma-specific "flag" that helps the immune system distinguish cancer cells from healthy ones. This makes it a promising target for immunotherapy because it is largely unique to melanoma tissue.

A second study by Kong et al. found similar results to previous study by Rosenburg et al. The study referenced how the disturbance of the WDR46 gene often led to many human disorders as the gene plays an important role in cellular processes such as NUSAP1 expression. NUSAP1 is a critical regulator of DNA replication and mitosis and it is closely linked with cancer, glioma, and renal cell carcinoma. The study found how higher expression of WDR46 was found in cancer tissues compared to normal tissues. The results suggested that an increase in WDR46 was related to liver cancer progression.

A study by Pasaje CF et al. found that when WDR46 is located at the disease-relevant centromere side of the class II major histocompatibility complex region, it can indicate as a genetic marker for higher risk of aspirin induced airway inflammation in a Korean population. The study was conducted in 6 hospitals in Korea, therefore it cannot be generalized to the global population. However, it made an important first step in recognizing a potential marker for an aspirin induced respiratory disorder for the first time.

Human brain tissue with a high expression of WDR46 relative to other tissues are the following occipital pole, left, lateral and superior aspect; paracentral lobule, anterior part, left; superior occipital gyrus, right, inferior bank of gyrus; paracentral lobule, posterior part, left, bank of cingulate sulcus; VIIIA, right, lateral hemisphere; anterior orbital gyrus, left; inferior frontal gyrus, opercular part, left; inferior occipital gyrus, right, inferior bank of gyrus; occipital pole, left, inferior aspect; cingulate gyrus, retrosplenial part, right, inferior bank of gyrus; subcallosal cingulate gyrus, right; inferior occipital gyrus, right, superior bank of gyrus; inferior frontal gyrus, triangular part, left; superior frontal gyrus, left; superior rostral gyrus, left; supramarginal gyrus, left, superior bank of gyrus; inferior rostral gyrus, left; posterior orbital gyrus, left; postcentral gyrus, left, inferior lateral aspect of gyrus; medial orbital gyrus, left; frontal pole, right, superior aspect; superior temporal gyrus, left, lateral bank of gyrus; postcentral gyrus, right, bank of the posterior central sulcus; and supramarginal gyrus, right, superior bank of gyrus. Some commonalities of these regions are that they belong to large scale attention and control networks such as the Dorsal Attention Network and Frontoparietal control network. They are classic fMRI-activated regions and demand high cognitive control and perception networks.

Wada et al. found dynamics of WD-repeat containing proteins in SSU processome components. WDR46 is one of the nine WD-repeat proteins that are involved in the HeLa cell nuclear matrix fraction. The study found that most of the proteins localized to granular and dense fibrillar component regions in the nucleoli. However, after suppressing rRNA transcription, the proteins continued to have slow mobility suggesting that those WD-repeat proteins also acted as a scaffold or core for the nucleoli.

A study by Hirai et al., supports the findings of the previous study. Where they demonstrated how WDR46 contributed to the prototypic inner nucleolar arrangement, particularly the GC arrangement. The researchers discovered how the disordered inner regions of the protein played an important part in its nucleolar localization and how it aided its ability to bind to its binding partners. The study also found how the subnucleolar localization of nucleolin and DDX21 were dependent on WDR46. Due to their dependence on WDR46, nucleolin and DDX21 accumulation was delayed in WDR46 depleted cells suggesting that WDR46 likely plays a crucial role in assisting nucleolar components in localization. The study also noted how although nucleolin and DDX21 were affected, the localization of NOP2, EBP2, and B23 were not. Since both nucleolin and DDX21 are central for 18S rRNA processing, researchers concluded that WDR46 likely plays an important role in the 18S rRNA processing assmble.
