= SMU1 =

Protein-coding gene in the species Homo sapiens

Identifiers
- Aliases: SMU1, BWD, SMU-1, fSAP57, smu-1 suppressor of mec-8 and unc-52 homolog (C. elegans), DNA replication regulator and spliceosomal factor, DNA replication regulator and spliceosomal factor, SMU1 DNA replication regulator and spliceosomal factor
- External IDs: OMIM: 617811; MGI: 1915546; GeneCards: SMU1

Gene location (Human)
| Chr. | Chromosome 9 (human) |
| Band | 9p21.1 | Start | 33,041,765 bp |
| Band | 9p21.1 | End | 33,076,674 bp |

Gene location (Mouse)
| Chr. | Chromosome 4 (mouse) |
| Band | 4|4 A5 | Start | 40,736,542 bp |
| Band | 4|4 A5 | End | 40,757,923 bp |
RNA expression pattern
| Bgee | Human / Mouse (ortholog); Top expressed in: internal globus pallidus; tendon; Achilles tendon; tendon of biceps brachii; islet of Langerhans; white blood cell; monocyte; ventricular zone; Brodmann area 23; corpus callosum / Top expressed in: spermatocyte; secondary oocyte; spermatid; medial ganglionic eminence; primitive streak; primary oocyte; maxillary prominence; mandibular prominence; zygote; abdominal wall; More reference expression data |
| BioGPS | n/a |
Gene ontology
| Molecular function | protein binding |
| Cellular component | cytoplasm; nuclear speck; nucleus; U2-type precatalytic spliceosome |
| Biological process | regulation of alternative mRNA splicing, via spliceosome; mRNA processing; RNA splicing; mRNA splicing, via spliceosome |
Sources:Amigo / QuickGO
Orthologs
| Databases | NCBI: entry; OMA: entry |
| Species | Human | Mouse |
| Entrez | 55234 | 74255 |
| Ensembl | ENSG00000122692 | ENSMUSG00000028409 |
| UniProt | Q2TAY7 | Q3UKJ7 |
| RefSeq (mRNA) | NM_018225 | NM_021535 |
| RefSeq (protein) | NP_060695; NP_060695.2 | NP_067510 |
| Location (UCSC) | Chr 9: 33.04 – 33.08 Mb | Chr 4: 40.74 – 40.76 Mb |
| PubMed search |
- Wikidata
| View/Edit Human | View/Edit Mouse |

WD40 repeat-containing protein SMU1 is a protein that in humans is encoded by the SMU1 gene.
