= WDR24 =

Protein-coding gene in the species Homo sapiens

Identifiers
- Aliases: WDR24, C16orf21, JFP7, WD repeat domain 24
- External IDs: MGI: 2446285; GeneCards: WDR24
Enzyme activity
EC #	BRENDA	ExPASy	KEGG	MetaCyc
2.3.2.27	↗	↗	↗	↗

Gene location (Human)
Chr.	Chromosome 16 (human)
Band	16p13.3	Start	684,622 bp
Band	16p13.3	End	690,444 bp

Gene location (Mouse)
Chr.	Chromosome 17 (mouse)
Band	17|17 A3.3	Start	26,042,601 bp
Band	17|17 A3.3	End	26,047,704 bp
RNA expression pattern
Bgee	Human / Mouse (ortholog); Top expressed in: right uterine tube; apex of heart; right hemisphere of cerebellum; gonad; gastrocnemius muscle; stromal cell of endometrium; muscle of thigh; right adrenal gland; left testis; right testis / Top expressed in: spermatocyte; otolith organ; utricle; spermatid; granulocyte; medullary collecting duct; renal corpuscle; hand; otic vesicle; epiblast; More reference expression data
BioGPS	n/a
Gene ontology
Molecular function	protein binding
Cellular component	GATOR2 complex; lysosome; lysosomal membrane; membrane
Biological process	cellular response to amino acid starvation; regulation of autophagy; autophagy; positive regulation of TOR signaling
Sources:Amigo / QuickGO
Orthologs
Databases	NCBI: entry; OMA: entry
Species	Human	Mouse
Entrez	84219	268933
Ensembl	ENSG00000127580	ENSMUSG00000025737
UniProt	Q96S15	Q8CFJ9
RefSeq (mRNA)	NM_032259	NM_173741
RefSeq (protein)	NP_115635	NP_776102
Location (UCSC)	Chr 16: 0.68 – 0.69 Mb	Chr 17: 26.04 – 26.05 Mb
PubMed search
- Wikidata
View/Edit Human	View/Edit Mouse

WD repeat-containing protein 24 is a protein that in humans is encoded by the WDR24 gene.
