= FBXW5 =

Protein-coding gene in the species Homo sapiens

Identifiers
- Aliases: FBXW5, Fbw5, F-box and WD repeat domain containing 5
- External IDs: OMIM: 609072; MGI: 1354731; GeneCards: FBXW5

Gene location (Human)
Chr.	Chromosome 9 (human)
Band	9q34.3	Start	136,940,435 bp
Band	9q34.3	End	136,944,738 bp

Gene location (Mouse)
Chr.	Chromosome 2 (mouse)
Band	2|2 A3	Start	25,390,762 bp
Band	2|2 A3	End	25,395,483 bp
RNA expression pattern
Bgee	Human / Mouse (ortholog); Top expressed in: right testis; left testis; apex of heart; popliteal artery; tibial arteries; muscle of thigh; gastrocnemius muscle; granulocyte; right lobe of liver; right coronary artery / Top expressed in: spermatocyte; spermatid; seminiferous tubule; muscle of thigh; entorhinal cortex; superior frontal gyrus; primary visual cortex; saccule; perirhinal cortex; right kidney; More reference expression data
BioGPS	n/a
Gene ontology
Molecular function	protein binding; protein kinase binding; ubiquitin-protein transferase activity
Cellular component	Cul4-RING E3 ubiquitin ligase complex; cytoplasm; SCF ubiquitin ligase complex; cytosol
Biological process	proteasome-mediated ubiquitin-dependent protein catabolic process; protein ubiquitination; regulation of centrosome duplication; SCF-dependent proteasomal ubiquitin-dependent protein catabolic process; protein polyubiquitination; regulation of mitotic nuclear division; post-translational protein modification
Sources:Amigo / QuickGO
Orthologs
Databases	NCBI: entry; OMA: entry
Species	Human	Mouse
Entrez	54461	30839
Ensembl	ENSG00000159069	ENSMUSG00000015095
UniProt	Q969U6	Q9QXW2
RefSeq (mRNA)	NM_018998; NM_178225; NM_178226	NM_013908; NM_001356407; NM_001356408
RefSeq (protein)	NP_061871	NP_038936; NP_001343336; NP_001343337
Location (UCSC)	Chr 9: 136.94 – 136.94 Mb	Chr 2: 25.39 – 25.4 Mb
PubMed search
- Wikidata
View/Edit Human	View/Edit Mouse

F-box/WD repeat-containing protein 5 is a protein that in humans is encoded by the FBXW5 gene.

This gene encodes a member of the F-box protein family, members of which are characterized by an approximately 40 amino acid motif, the F-box. The F-box proteins constitute one of the four subunits of ubiquitin protein ligase complex called SCFs (SKP1-cullin-F-box), which function in phosphorylation-dependent ubiquitination. The F-box proteins are divided into three classes: Fbws containing WD-40 domains, Fbls containing leucine-rich repeats, and Fbxs containing either different protein-protein interaction modules or no recognizable motifs. The protein encoded by this gene contains WD-40 domains, in addition to an F-box motif, so it belongs to the Fbw class. Alternatively spliced transcript variants encoding distinct isoforms have been identified for this gene, however, they were found to be nonsense-mediated Messenger RNA decay candidates, hence not represented. Well established targets of FBXW5 include TSC2 and SEC23B.
