= EML1 =

Protein-coding gene in the species Homo sapiens

Identifiers
- Aliases: EML1, ELP79, EMAP, EMAPL, HuEMAP, echinoderm microtubule associated protein like 1, BH, EMAP like 1, EMAP-1
- External IDs: OMIM: 602033; MGI: 1915769; GeneCards: EML1
Available structures
PDB	Ortholog search: PDBe RCSB
PDB	List of PDB id codes 4CI8

Gene location (Human)
Chr.	Chromosome 14 (human)
Band	14q32.2	Start	99,737,693 bp
Band	14q32.2	End	99,942,060 bp

Gene location (Mouse)
Chr.	Chromosome 12 (mouse)
Band	12 F1|12 59.46 cM	Start	108,370,957 bp
Band	12 F1|12 59.46 cM	End	108,539,617 bp
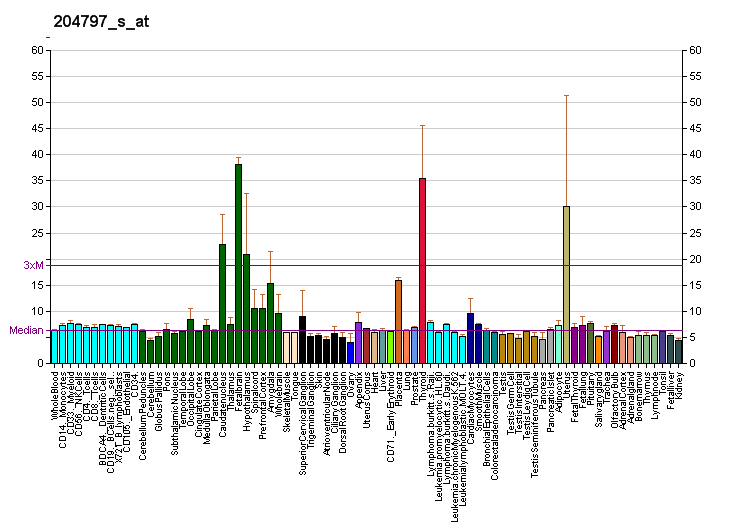

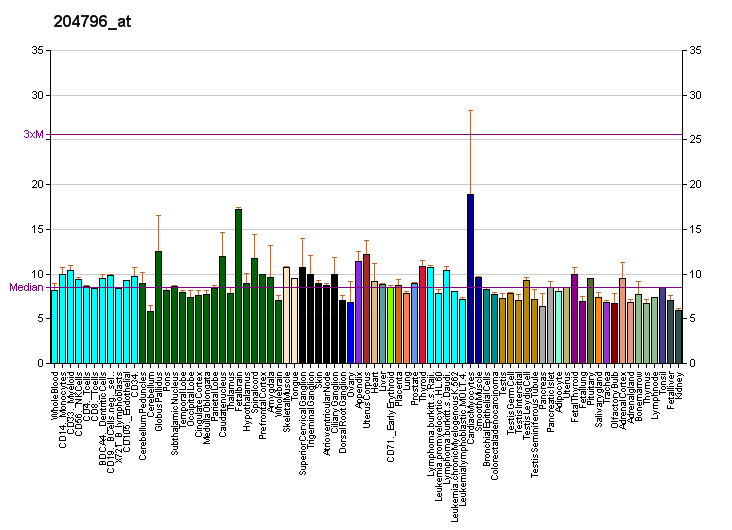
RNA expression pattern
Bgee	Human / Mouse (ortholog); Top expressed in: ganglionic eminence; gastric mucosa; synovial joint; epithelium of colon; ventricular zone; muscle layer of sigmoid colon; Achilles tendon; right lung; amniotic fluid; stromal cell of endometrium / Top expressed in: interventricular septum; superior cervical ganglion; muscle of thigh; spinal ganglia; lumbar spinal ganglion; neural tube; knee joint; neural layer of retina; ventricular zone; skeletal muscle tissue; More reference expression data
BioGPS	More reference expression data
Gene ontology
Molecular function	tubulin binding; calcium ion binding; protein binding; microtubule binding
Cellular component	cytoplasm; perinuclear region of cytoplasm; mitotic spindle midzone; cytosol; mitotic spindle pole; microtubule; cytoskeleton; microtubule associated complex; microtubule cytoskeleton; mitotic spindle
Biological process	neuroblast proliferation; mitotic spindle organization; brain development; hematopoietic progenitor cell differentiation; microtubule cytoskeleton organization
Sources:Amigo / QuickGO
Orthologs
Databases	NCBI: entry; OMA: entry
Species	Human	Mouse
Entrez	2009	68519
Ensembl	ENSG00000066629	ENSMUSG00000058070
UniProt	O00423	Q05BC3
RefSeq (mRNA)	NM_001008707; NM_004434; NM_001375411; NM_001375412	NM_001043335; NM_001043336; NM_001286346; NM_001286347
RefSeq (protein)	NP_001008707; NP_004425; NP_001362340; NP_001362341	NP_001036800; NP_001036801; NP_001273275; NP_001273276; NP_001351122 NP_001351123; NP_001351124; NP_001351125; NP_001351126; NP_001351127; NP_001351128
Location (UCSC)	Chr 14: 99.74 – 99.94 Mb	Chr 12: 108.37 – 108.54 Mb
PubMed search
- Wikidata
View/Edit Human	View/Edit Mouse

Echinoderm microtubule-associated protein-like 1 is a protein that in humans is encoded by the EML1 gene.

Human echinoderm microtubule-associated protein-like is a strong candidate for the Usher syndrome type 1A gene. Usher syndromes (USHs) are a group of genetic disorders consisting of congenital deafness, retinitis pigmentosa, and vestibular dysfunction of variable onset and severity depending on the genetic type. The disease process in USHs involves the entire brain and is not limited to the posterior fossa or auditory and visual systems. The USHs are categorized as type I (USH1A, USH1B, USH1C, USH1D, USH1E and USH1F), type II (USH2A and USH2B) and type III (USH3). The type I is the most severe form. Gene loci responsible for these three types are all mapped. Two transcript variants encoding different isoforms have been found for this gene.
