= WDHD1 =

Protein-coding gene in the species Homo sapiens

Identifiers
- Aliases: WDHD1, AND-1, CHTF4, CTF4, AND1, WD repeat and HMG-box DNA binding protein 1, Ctf4
- External IDs: OMIM: 608126; MGI: 2443514; GeneCards: WDHD1
Available structures
PDB	Ortholog search: PDBe RCSB
PDB	List of PDB id codes 2D7L

Gene location (Human)
Chr.	Chromosome 14 (human)
Band	14q22.2-q22.3	Start	54,938,949 bp
Band	14q22.2-q22.3	End	55,027,105 bp

Gene location (Mouse)
Chr.	Chromosome 14 (mouse)
Band	14|14 C1	Start	47,478,401 bp
Band	14|14 C1	End	47,514,314 bp
RNA expression pattern
Bgee	Human / Mouse (ortholog); Top expressed in: gonad; ventricular zone; testicle; ganglionic eminence; secondary oocyte; stromal cell of endometrium; epithelium of colon; mucosa of transverse colon; bone marrow cell; Achilles tendon / Top expressed in: otic placode; otic vesicle; primitive streak; saccule; tail of embryo; epiblast; genital tubercle; ventricular zone; secondary oocyte; fetal liver hematopoietic progenitor cell; More reference expression data
BioGPS	n/a
Gene ontology
Molecular function	protein binding; DNA binding; chromatin binding; RNA binding; RNA polymerase binding; DNA-binding transcription factor activity, RNA polymerase II-specific
Cellular component	cytoplasm; nucleus; nucleoplasm; chromosome, centromeric region; replication fork protection complex; nuclear replication fork
Biological process	RNA processing; regulation of chromosome organization; regulation of transcription by RNA polymerase II; mitotic cell cycle; DNA-dependent DNA replication; DNA repair; cellular response to DNA damage stimulus
Sources:Amigo / QuickGO
Orthologs
Databases	NCBI: entry; OMA: entry
Species	Human	Mouse
Entrez	11169	218973
Ensembl	ENSG00000198554	ENSMUSG00000037572
UniProt	O75717	P59328
RefSeq (mRNA)	NM_001008396; NM_007086	NM_172598; NM_001360532
RefSeq (protein)	NP_001008397; NP_009017	NP_766186; NP_001347461
Location (UCSC)	Chr 14: 54.94 – 55.03 Mb	Chr 14: 47.48 – 47.51 Mb
PubMed search
- Wikidata
View/Edit Human	View/Edit Mouse

WD repeat and HMG-box DNA binding protein 1 is a protein in humans that is encoded by the WDHD1 gene.

The protein encoded by this gene contains multiple N-terminal WD40 domains and a C-terminal high mobility group (HMG) box. WD40 domains are found in a variety of eukaryotic proteins and may function as adaptor/regulatory modules in signal transduction, pre-mRNA processing and cytoskeleton assembly. HMG boxes are found in many eukaryotic proteins involved in chromatin assembly, transcription and replication. Alternative splicing results in two transcript variants encoding different isoforms. [provided by RefSeq, Jul 2008].
