= CDC40 =

Protein-coding gene in humans

Identifiers
- Aliases: CDC40, EHB3, PRP17, PRPF17, cell division cycle 40, PCH15
- External IDs: OMIM: 605585; MGI: 1918963; GeneCards: CDC40

Gene location (Human)
Chr.	Chromosome 6 (human)
Band	6q21	Start	110,180,141 bp
Band	6q21	End	110,254,275 bp

Gene location (Mouse)
Chr.	Chromosome 10 (mouse)
Band	10|10 B1	Start	40,707,617 bp
Band	10|10 B1	End	40,759,307 bp
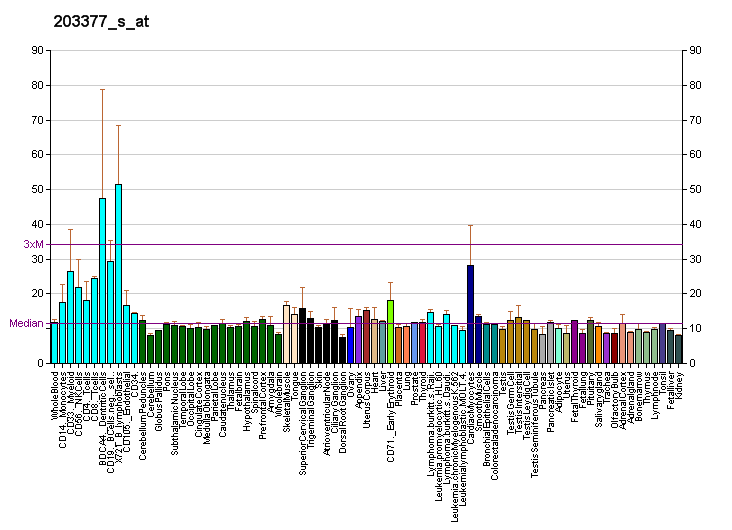

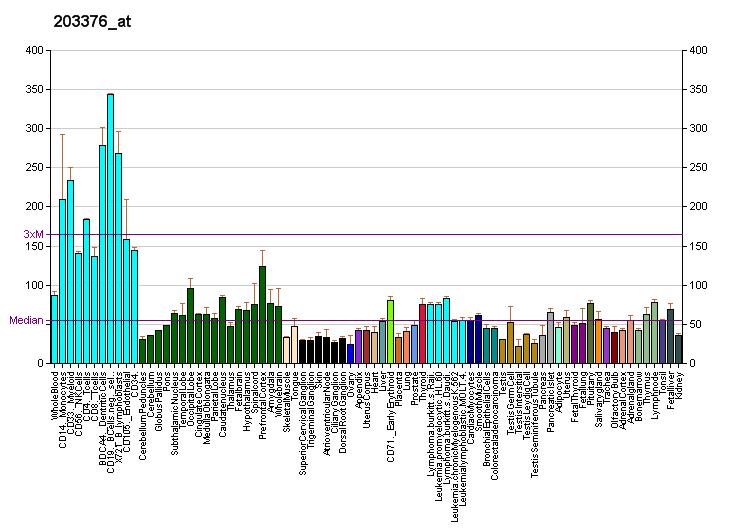
RNA expression pattern
Bgee	Human / Mouse (ortholog); Top expressed in: middle temporal gyrus; sperm; mononuclear cell; Achilles tendon; monocyte; secondary oocyte; skin of hip; mucosa of ileum; bone marrow; skin of thigh / Top expressed in: hand; lumbar subsegment of spinal cord; Rostral migratory stream; genital tubercle; otolith organ; utricle; zygote; interventricular septum; tail of embryo; Paneth cell; More reference expression data
BioGPS	More reference expression data
Gene ontology
Molecular function	protein binding; RNA binding
Cellular component	catalytic step 2 spliceosome; spliceosomal complex; nucleoplasm; nucleus; U2-type catalytic step 2 spliceosome; nuclear speck
Biological process	mRNA splicing, via spliceosome; termination of RNA polymerase II transcription; mRNA processing; mRNA export from nucleus; mRNA 3'-end processing; RNA splicing; RNA export from nucleus
Sources:Amigo / QuickGO
Orthologs
Databases	NCBI: entry; OMA: entry
Species	Human	Mouse
Entrez	51362	71713
Ensembl	ENSG00000168438	ENSMUSG00000038446
UniProt	O60508	Q9DC48
RefSeq (mRNA)	NM_015891	NM_027879
RefSeq (protein)	NP_056975	NP_082155
Location (UCSC)	Chr 6: 110.18 – 110.25 Mb	Chr 10: 40.71 – 40.76 Mb
PubMed search
- Wikidata
View/Edit Human	View/Edit Mouse

Pre-mRNA-processing factor 17 is a protein that in humans is encoded by the CDC40 gene.

Pre-mRNA splicing occurs in two sequential transesterification steps. The protein encoded by this gene is found to be essential for the catalytic step II in pre-mRNA splicing process. It is found in the spliceosome, and contains seven WD repeats, which function in protein-protein interactions. This protein has a sequence similarity to yeast Prp17 protein, which functions in two different cellular processes: pre-mRNA splicing and cell cycle progression. It suggests that this protein may play a role in cell cycle progression.
