= WDR36 =

Protein-coding gene in the species Homo sapiens

Identifiers
- Aliases: WDR36, GLC1G, TA-WDRP, TAWDRP, UTP21, WD repeat domain 36
- External IDs: OMIM: 609669; MGI: 1917819; GeneCards: WDR36

Gene location (Human)
Chr.	Chromosome 5 (human)
Band	5q22.1	Start	111,092,321 bp
Band	5q22.1	End	111,130,502 bp

Gene location (Mouse)
Chr.	Chromosome 18 (mouse)
Band	18|18 B1	Start	32,970,278 bp
Band	18|18 B1	End	33,000,647 bp
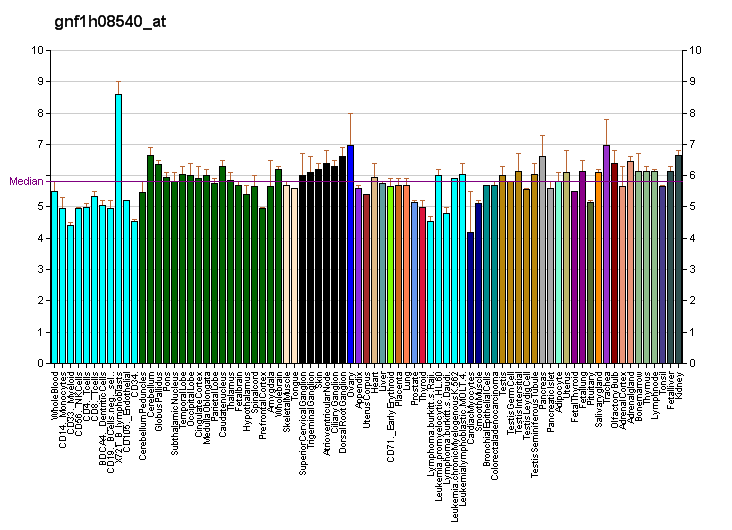

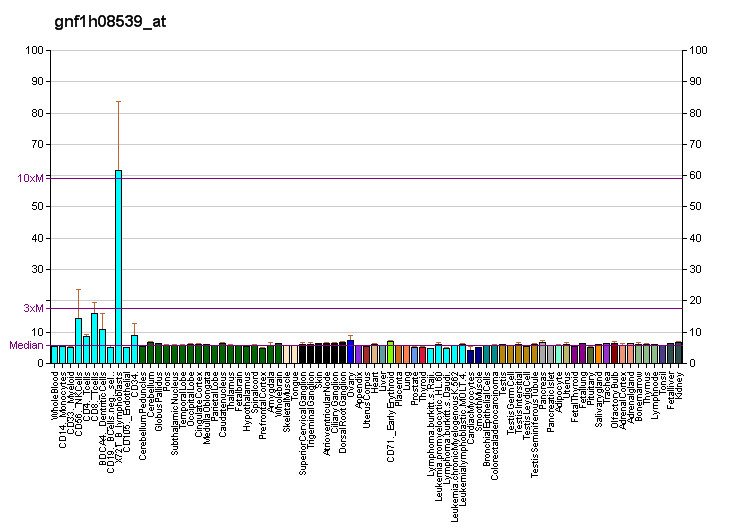
RNA expression pattern
Bgee	Human / Mouse (ortholog); Top expressed in: Achilles tendon; tibialis anterior muscle; deltoid muscle; skin of arm; pancreatic epithelial cell; testicle; parietal pleura; germinal epithelium; gonad; mucosa of ileum / Top expressed in: primary oocyte; epiblast; lumbar spinal ganglion; primitive streak; secondary oocyte; spermatocyte; endothelial cell of lymphatic vessel; embryo; morula; abdominal wall; More reference expression data
BioGPS	More reference expression data
Gene ontology
Molecular function	RNA binding
Cellular component	nucleolus; nucleus; nucleoplasm; small-subunit processome; Pwp2p-containing subcomplex of 90S preribosome
Biological process	retina homeostasis; regulation of axon extension; ribosome biogenesis; response to stimulus; visual perception; rRNA processing; biological process
Sources:Amigo / QuickGO
Orthologs
Databases	NCBI: entry; OMA: entry
Species	Human	Mouse
Entrez	134430	225348
Ensembl	ENSG00000134987	ENSMUSG00000038299
UniProt	Q8NI36	n/a
RefSeq (mRNA)	NM_139281	NM_001110015; NM_001110016; NM_144863
RefSeq (protein)	NP_644810	n/a
Location (UCSC)	Chr 5: 111.09 – 111.13 Mb	Chr 18: 32.97 – 33 Mb
PubMed search
- Wikidata
View/Edit Human	View/Edit Mouse

WD repeat-containing protein 36 is a protein that in humans is encoded by the WDR36 gene.

This gene encodes a member of the WD repeat protein family. WD repeats are minimally conserved regions of approximately 40 amino acids typically bracketed by gly-his and trp-asp (GH-WD), which may facilitate formation of heterotrimeric or multiprotein complexes. Members of this family are involved in a variety of cellular processes, including cell cycle progression, signal transduction, apoptosis, and gene regulation. Mutations in this gene have been associated with adult-onset primary open-angle glaucoma (POAG).
