= WD repeat domain 91 =

Protein-coding gene in the species Homo sapiens

WDR91

Identifiers
- Aliases: WDR91, HSPC049, Wd repeat domain 91, SORF-1, SORF1
- External IDs: OMIM: 616303; MGI: 2141558; GeneCards: WDR91

Gene location (Human)
Chr.	Chromosome 7 (human)
Band	7q33	Start	135,183,839 bp
Band	7q33	End	135,211,555 bp

Gene location (Mouse)
Chr.	Chromosome 6 (mouse)
Band	6|6 B1	Start	34,857,361 bp
Band	6|6 B1	End	34,887,811 bp
RNA expression pattern
Bgee	Human / Mouse (ortholog); Top expressed in: right uterine tube; body of pancreas; left ovary; right ovary; right lung; sural nerve; mucosa of esophagus; gastric mucosa; upper lobe of left lung; tendon of biceps brachii / Top expressed in: zygote; stroma of bone marrow; secondary oocyte; primary oocyte; yolk sac; right kidney; renal cortex; proximal tubule; dentate gyrus of hippocampal formation granule cell; thymus; More reference expression data
BioGPS	n/a
Gene ontology
Molecular function	protein binding; phosphatidylinositol 3-kinase regulator activity
Cellular component	cytosol; extrinsic component of endosome membrane; endosome; membrane; early endosome membrane; late endosome membrane
Biological process	regulation of phosphatidylinositol 3-kinase activity; early endosome to late endosome transport; ubiquitin-dependent protein catabolic process
Sources:Amigo / QuickGO
Orthologs
Databases	NCBI: entry; OMA: entry
Species	Human	Mouse
Entrez	29062	101240
Ensembl	ENSG00000105875	ENSMUSG00000058486
UniProt	A4D1P6	Q7TMQ7
RefSeq (mRNA)	NM_014149; NM_001362736; NM_001362737; NM_001362738	NM_001013366
RefSeq (protein)	NP_054868; NP_001349665; NP_001349666; NP_001349667	NP_001013384
Location (UCSC)	Chr 7: 135.18 – 135.21 Mb	Chr 6: 34.86 – 34.89 Mb
PubMed search
- Wikidata
View/Edit Human	View/Edit Mouse

WD repeat domain 91 is a protein that in humans is encoded by the WDR91 gene.
