= Intraflagellar transport =

Cellular process

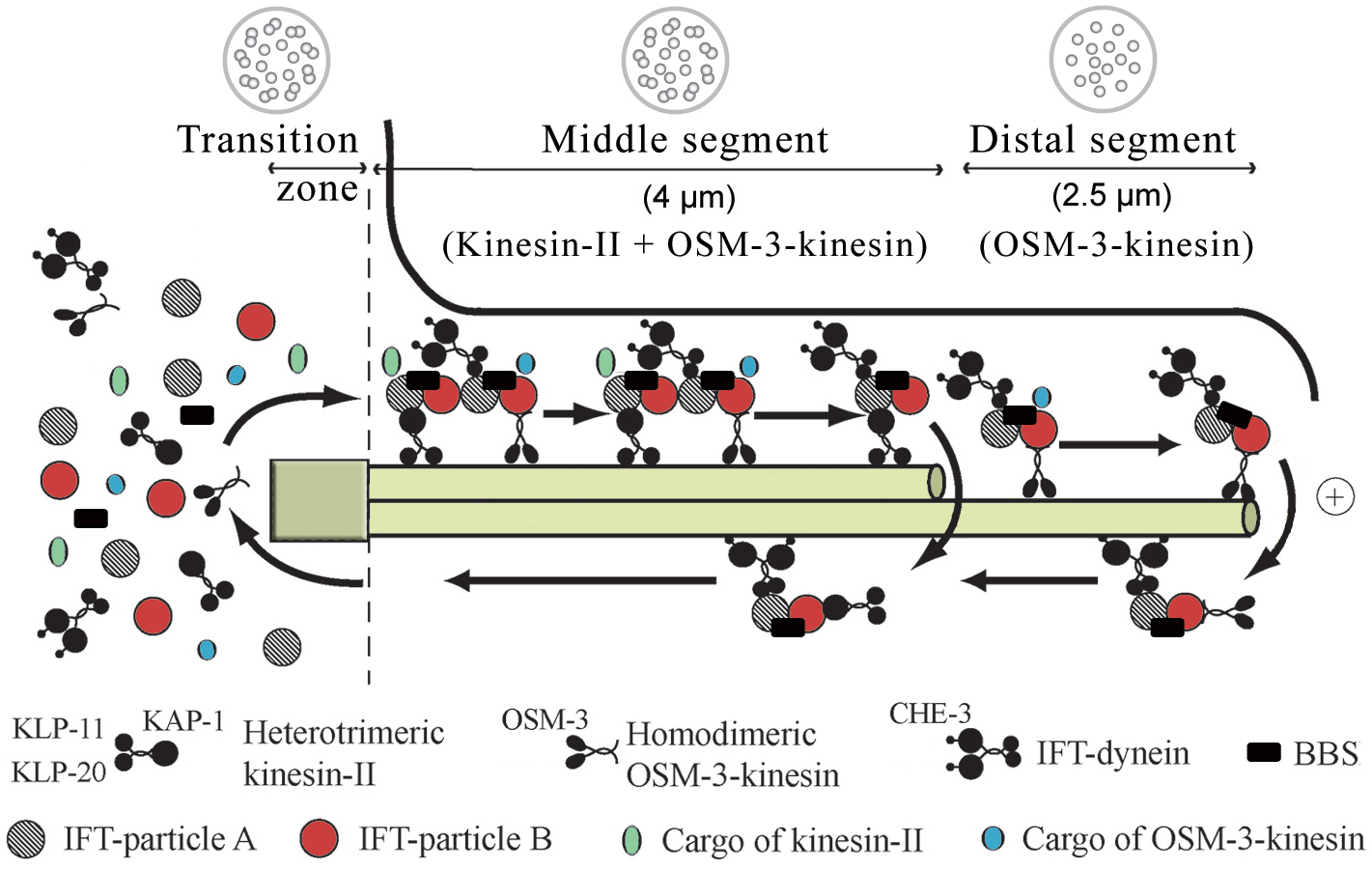
Intraflagellar transport in the cilia of the nematode C. elegans

Intraflagellar transport (IFT) is a bidirectional motility along axoneme microtubules that is essential for the formation (ciliogenesis) and maintenance of most eukaryotic cilia and flagella. It is thought to be required to build all cilia that assemble within a membrane projection from the cell surface. Plasmodium falciparum cilia and the sperm flagella of Drosophila are examples of cilia that assemble in the cytoplasm and do not require IFT. The process of IFT involves movement of large protein complexes called IFT particles or trains from the cell body to the ciliary tip and followed by their return to the cell body. The outward or anterograde movement is powered by kinesin-2 while the inward or retrograde movement is powered by cytoplasmic dynein 2/1b. The IFT particles are composed of about 20 proteins organized in two subcomplexes called complex A and B.

IFT was first reported in 1993 by graduate student Keith Kozminski while working in the lab of Dr. Joel Rosenbaum at Yale University. The process of IFT has been best characterized in the biflagellate alga Chlamydomonas reinhardtii as well as the sensory cilia of the nematode Caenorhabditis elegans.

It has been suggested based on localization studies that IFT proteins also function outside of cilia.

== Biochemistry ==
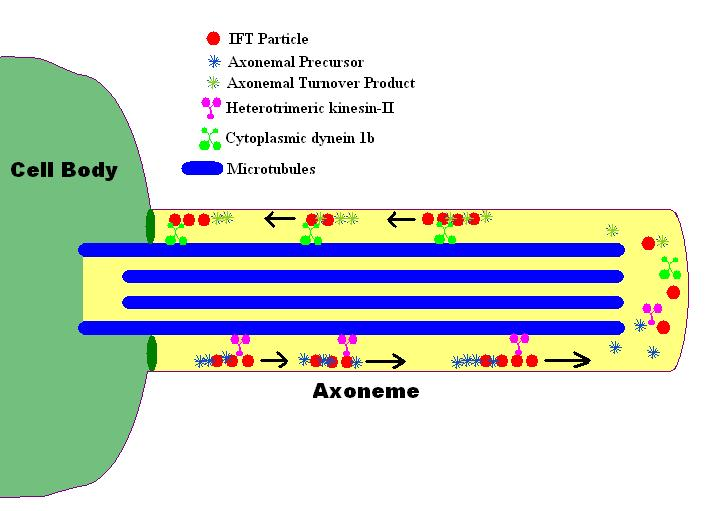
A simplified model of intraflagellar transport.

Intraflagellar transport (IFT) describes the bi-directional movement of non-membrane-bound particles along the doublet microtubules of the flagellar, and motile cilia axoneme, between the axoneme and the plasma membrane. Studies have shown that the movement of IFT particles along the microtubule is carried out by two different microtubule motors; the anterograde (towards the flagellar tip) motor is heterotrimeric kinesin-2, and the retrograde (towards the cell body) motor is cytoplasmic dynein 1b. IFT particles carry axonemal subunits to the site of assembly at the tip of the axoneme; thus, IFT is necessary for axonemal growth. Therefore, since the axoneme needs a continually fresh supply of proteins, an axoneme with defective IFT machinery will slowly shrink in the absence of replacement protein subunits. In healthy flagella, IFT particles reverse direction at the tip of the axoneme, and are thought to carry used proteins, or "turnover products," back to the base of the flagellum.

The IFT particles themselves consist of two sub-complexes, each made up of several individual IFT proteins. The two complexes, known as 'A' and 'B,' are separable via sucrose centrifugation (both complexes at approximately 16S, but under increased ionic strength complex B sediments more slowly, thus segregating the two complexes). The many subunits of the IFT complexes have been named according to their molecular weights:

- complex A contains IFT144, IFT140, IFT139, IFT122, IFT121 and IFT43
- complex B contains IFT172, IFT88, IFT81, IFT80, IFT74, IFT57, IFT56, IFT54, IFT52, IFT46, IFT38, IFT27, IFT25, IFT22, and IFT20

IFT-B complex have been further subcategorized to IFT-B1 (core) and IFT-B2 (peripheral) subcomplexes. These subcomplexes were first described by Lucker et al. in an experiment on Chlamydomonas reinhardtii, using increased ionic strength to dissociate the peripheral particles from the whole IFT-B complex. They realized that the core particles do not need the peripheral ones in order to form an assembly.

- IFT-B1 (core) consists of IFT172, IFT80, IFT 57, IFT54, IFT38, IFT20 (six members).
- IFT-B2 (peripheral) consists of IFT88, IFT81, IFT74, IFT70, IFT56, IFT52, IFT46, IFT27, IFT25, IFT22 (10 members).

The biochemical properties and biological functions of IFT subunits are just beginning to be elucidated, for example they interact with components of the basal body like CEP170 or proteins which are required for cilium formation like tubulin chaperone and membrane proteins.

== Physiological importance ==
Due to the importance of IFT in maintaining functional cilia, defective IFT machinery has now been implicated in many disease phenotypes generally associated with non-functional (or absent) cilia. IFT88, for example, encodes a protein also known as Tg737 or Polaris in mouse and human, and the loss of this protein has been found to cause an autosomal-recessive polycystic kidney disease model phenotype in mice. Further, the mislocalization of this protein following WDR62 knockdown in mice results in brain malformation and ciliopathies. Other human diseases such as retinal degeneration, situs inversus (a reversal of the body's left-right axis), Senior–Løken syndrome, liver disease, primary ciliary dyskinesia, nephronophthisis, Alström syndrome, Meckel–Gruber syndrome, Sensenbrenner syndrome, Jeune syndrome, and Bardet–Biedl syndrome, which causes both cystic kidneys and retinal degeneration, have been linked to the IFT machinery. This diverse group of genetic syndromes and genetic diseases are now understood to arise due to malfunctioning cilia, and the term "ciliopathy" is now used to indicate their common origin. These and possibly many more disorders may be better understood via study of IFT.

Human genetic syndromes associated with mutations in IFT genes
IFT gene	Other name	Human disease	reference
IFT27	RABL4	Bardet–Biedl syndrome	
IFT43	C14ORF179	Sensenbrenner syndrome	
IFT121	WDR35	Sensenbrenner syndrome	
IFT122	WDR10	Sensenbrenner syndrome	
IFT140	KIAA0590	Mainzer–Saldino syndrome	
IFT144	WDR19	Jeune syndrome, Sensenbrenner syndrome	
IFT172	SLB	Jeune syndrome, Mainzer–Saldino syndrome	

One of the most recent discoveries regarding IFT is its potential role in signal transduction. IFT has been shown to be necessary for the movement of other signaling proteins within the cilia, and therefore may play a role in many different signaling pathways. Specifically, IFT has been implicated as a mediator of sonic hedgehog signaling, one of the most important pathways in embryogenesis.
