= CFAP410 =

Protein-coding gene in humans

Identifiers
- Aliases: CFAP410, LRRC76, YF5/A2, chromosome 21 open reading frame 2, RDMS, SMDAX, C21orf2, cilia and flagella associated protein 410, Cilia- and flagella-associated protein 410
- External IDs: OMIM: 603191; MGI: 1915134; GeneCards: CFAP410

Gene location (Human)
Chr.	Chromosome 21 (human)
Band	21q22.3	Start	44,328,944 bp
Band	21q22.3	End	44,339,402 bp

Gene location (Mouse)
Chr.	Chromosome 10 (mouse)
Band	10 C1|10 39.72 cM	Start	77,814,358 bp
Band	10 C1|10 39.72 cM	End	77,822,739 bp
RNA expression pattern
Bgee	Human / Mouse (ortholog); Top expressed in: right uterine tube; anterior pituitary; right frontal lobe; right lobe of thyroid gland; left lobe of thyroid gland; nucleus accumbens; C1 segment; amygdala; putamen; apex of heart / Top expressed in: right kidney; dentate gyrus of hippocampal formation granule cell; superior frontal gyrus; primary visual cortex; spermatocyte; proximal tubule; granulocyte; pituitary gland; lens; cumulus cell; More reference expression data
BioGPS	n/a
Gene ontology
Molecular function	protein binding; molecular function
Cellular component	plasma membrane; cytoplasm; cell projection; mitochondrion; cytoskeleton; photoreceptor outer segment; photoreceptor connecting cilium; ciliary basal body; cilium; motile cilium
Biological process	cell projection organization; cytoskeleton organization; regulation of cell shape; cellular response to DNA damage stimulus; smoothened signaling pathway; cilium assembly; motile cilium assembly; cilium movement involved in cell motility
Sources:Amigo / QuickGO
Orthologs
Databases	NCBI: entry; OMA: entry
Species	Human	Mouse
Entrez	755	67884
Ensembl	ENSG00000160226	ENSMUSG00000020284
UniProt	O43822	Q8C6G1
RefSeq (mRNA)	NM_001271440; NM_001271441; NM_001271442; NM_004928	NM_026431
RefSeq (protein)	NP_001258369; NP_001258370; NP_001258371; NP_004919	NP_080707
Location (UCSC)	Chr 21: 44.33 – 44.34 Mb	Chr 10: 77.81 – 77.82 Mb
PubMed search
- Wikidata
View/Edit Human	View/Edit Mouse

Cilia and Flagella Associated Protein 410 (CFAP410, also known as C21orf2 or LRRC76) is a protein that in humans is encoded by the CFAP410 gene. It is essential for ciliogenesis. Mutations in CFAP410 have been linked to Jeune syndrome, Joubert syndrome, various ciliopathies, and amyotrophic lateral sclerosis.
