= C3orf80 =

Human gene

Identifiers
- Aliases: C3orf80, chromosome 3 open reading frame 80
- External IDs: MGI: 1915975; HomoloGene: 110165; GeneCards: C3orf80; OMA:C3orf80 - orthologs

Gene location (Human)
Chr.	Chromosome 3 (human)
Band	3q25.33	Start	160,225,422 bp
Band	3q25.33	End	160,228,213 bp

Gene location (Mouse)
Chr.	Chromosome 3 (mouse)
Band	3|3 E1	Start	68,776,919 bp
Band	3|3 E1	End	68,779,496 bp
RNA expression pattern
Bgee	Human / Mouse (ortholog); Top expressed in: endothelial cell; Brodmann area 23; Brodmann area 46; prefrontal cortex; dorsolateral prefrontal cortex; Brodmann area 9; middle temporal gyrus; primary visual cortex; right frontal lobe; superior frontal gyrus / Top expressed in: lumbar spinal ganglion; prefrontal cortex; ventricular zone; Region I of hippocampus proper; endocardial cushion; blastocyst; visual cortex; medial ganglionic eminence; superior frontal gyrus; primary visual cortex; More reference expression data
BioGPS	n/a
Orthologs
Species	Human	Mouse
Entrez	401097	68725
Ensembl	ENSG00000180044	ENSMUSG00000046999
UniProt	F5H4A9	E9Q0B3
RefSeq (mRNA)	NM_001168214	NM_001167996
RefSeq (protein)	NP_001161686	NP_001161468
Location (UCSC)	Chr 3: 160.23 – 160.23 Mb	Chr 3: 68.78 – 68.78 Mb
PubMed search
- Wikidata
View/Edit Human	View/Edit Mouse

Membrane protein C3orf80 (C3orf80) is a human protein encoded by the C3orf80 gene.

== Gene ==
C3orf80 is on chromosome 3 from 160,225,422 to 160,228,213 bp. It spans 2,792 bases on the plus strand and contains only one exon.

Neighboring genes of C3orf80 include IFT80, BRD7P2, and SMC4.

Gene	Orientation	Location	Function
IFT80	Minus strand	160,256,986-160,399,880	Part of IFT complex B
BRD7P2	Plus strand	160,100,691-160,102,912	Pseudogene of BRD7
SMC4	Plus strand	160,399,274-160,434,954	Part of the condensin complex

== Transcript ==
The mRNA transcript of human C3orf80 contains no introns, has only one isoform, and the complete sequence has been found.

=== Expression ===
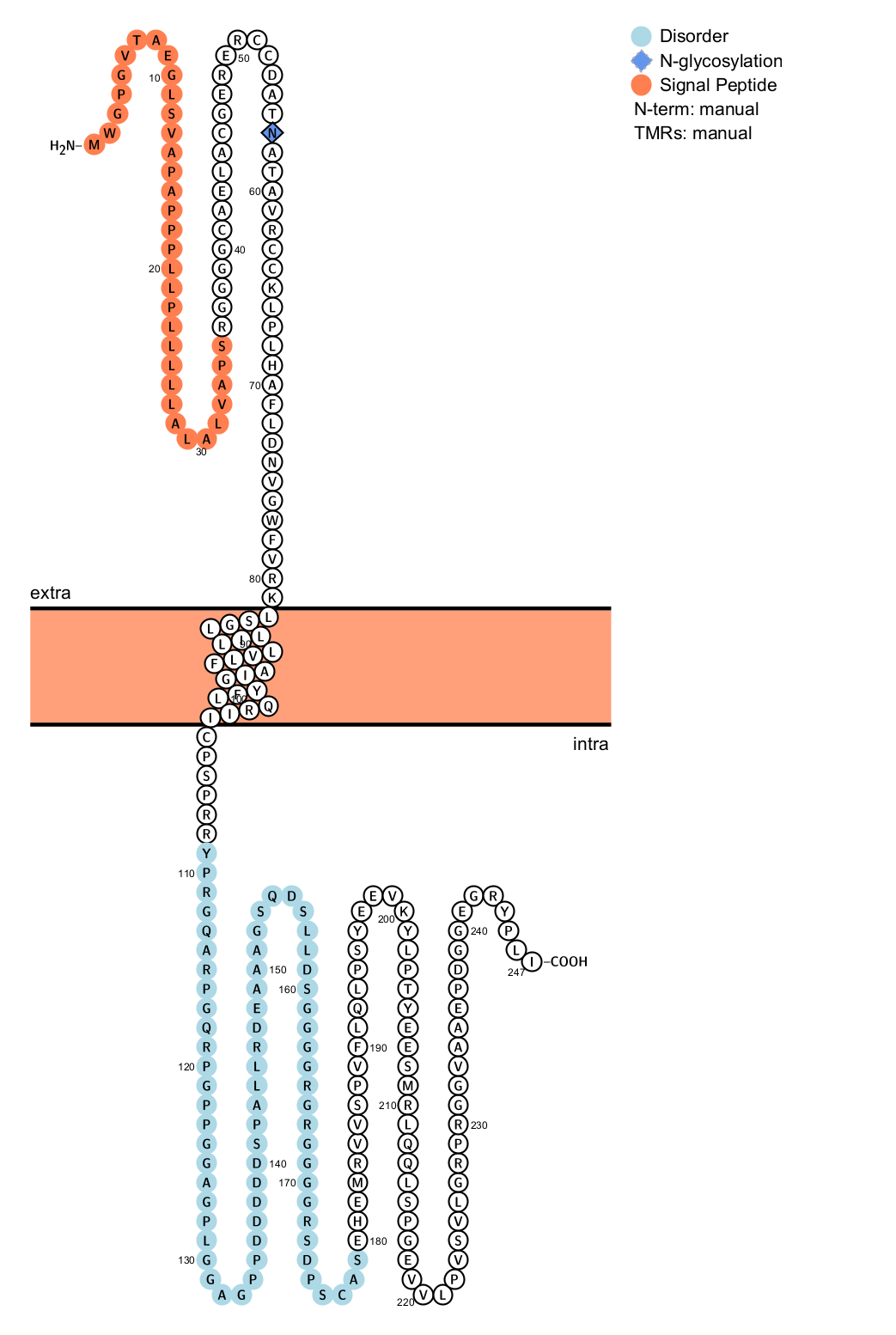
PROTTER diagram of C3orf80

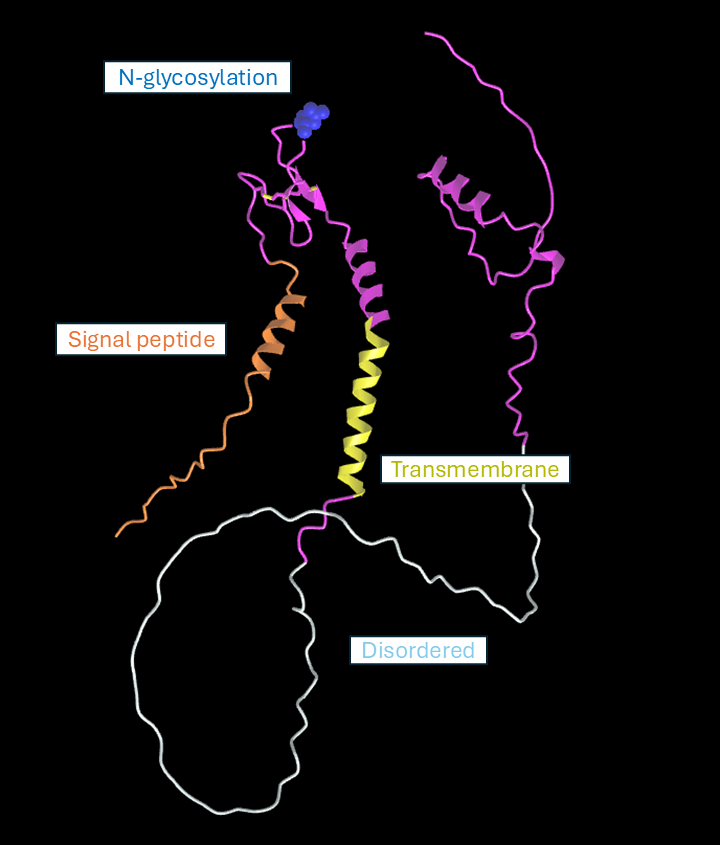
Annotated AlphaFold model of C3orf80

Expression of C3orf80 is highest in the cerebral cortex, esophagus, and colon. A higher expression of C3orf80 has been observed from multiple sclerosis brain lesions. Expression of C3orf80 has also been found by machine learning to be associated with different forms of cancer. A two-fold increase in expression was found in low-grade glioma based on whether the cells expressed CMTM3 or not. A 107.61 fold increase in expression was seen after inhibition of CLIC1 in esophageal squamous cell carcinoma. C3orf80 was one of three genes' expression levels found to form the best machine learning model for predicting invasive carcinoma. Finally, C3orf80 was one of 34 genes used in a machine learning model to predict if patients had a response to FOLFIRI chemotherapy.

== Protein ==
C3orf80 is 247 amino acids long, has a molecular weight of 25.6 kDa before modifications, and has been proven to exist at the protein level, however, the tertiary structure is unknown. The protein is annotated to be a single-pass membrane protein, localizing at the cell membrane. The amino acid sequence of C3orf80 contains a signal peptide, transmembrane region, disordered region, glycosylation, and domain of unknown function 4719 (DUF4719).

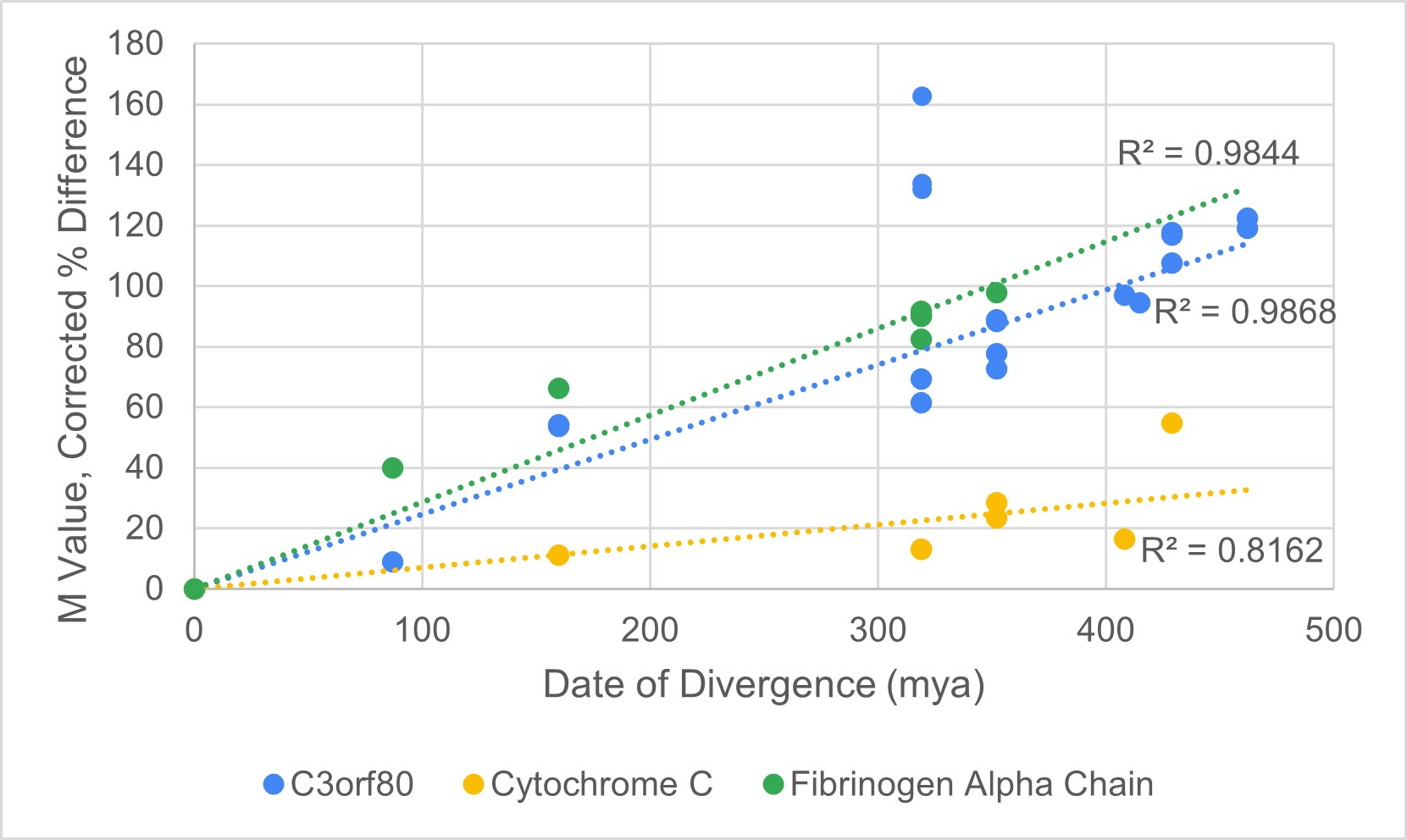
Graph showing corrected percent differences between orthologs and human genes over date of divergence.

Within humans, there is 0.02 ppm of C3orf80, a relatively low amount compared to other proteins. Immunochemical staining has shown protein localization in cilia of glandular cells of the human fallopian tube.

== Evolution ==
=== Orthologs ===
Orthologs of human C3orf80 are specific to vertebrates. The farthest ortholog of human C3orf80 is found in Callorhinchus milii, with a date of divergence of 462 million years ago. Orthologs can be found in all major groups from Chondrichthyes to Mammalia; however, Aves have unique orthologs of C3orf80 compared to any other group.

Scientific Name	Common Name	Group	Date of Divergence (mya)	Ortholog Accession Number	Sequence Length	Sequence Identity	Sequence Similarity
Homo sapiens	Human	Mammalia	0	NP_001161686.1	247	100%	100%
Mus musculus	House mouse	Mammalia	87	NP_001161468.1	247	92%	94%
Antechinus flavipes	Yellow-footed antechinus	Marsupialia	160	XP_051839055.1	237	59%	65%
Sarcophilus harrisii	Tasmanian devil	Marsupialia	160	XP_031813452.1	239	58%	65%
Alligator mississippiensis	American alligator	Reptilia	319	XP_019347204.1	210	54%	58%
Mauremys mutica	Yellow pond turtle	Reptilia	319	XP_044885017.1	203	50%	54%
Prinia subflava	Tawny-flanked prinia	Aves	319	XP_063264524.1	179	27%	33%
Gallus gallus	Red junglefowl	Aves	319	XP_025009399.2	145	26%	31%
Aquila chrysaetos	Golden eagle	Aves	319	XP_029884193.1	319	20%	25%
Pseudophryne corroboree	Southern corroboree frog	Amphibia	352	XP_063772225.1	194	48%	54%
Bufo bufo	Common toad	Amphibia	352	XP_040286993.1	189	46%	53%
Pleurodeles waltl	Iberian ribbed newt	Amphibia	352	KAJ1088024.1	240	41%	47%
Rhinatrema bivittatum	Rhinatrema	Amphibia	352	XP_029473235.1	206	41%	46%
Protopterus annectens	West African lungfish	Sarcopterygii	408	XP_043926856.1	210	38%	44%
Latimeria chalumnae	West Indian Ocean coelacanth	Sarcopterygii	415	XP_006002129.1	189	39%	44%
Polypterus senegalus	Gray bichir	Actinopterygii	429	XP_039612526.1	196	34%	45%
Chelmon rostratus	Copperband butterflyfish	Actinopterygii	429	XP_041796725.1	219	31%	42%
Danio rerio	Zebrafish	Actinopterygii	429	XP_068069764.1	162	31%	39%
Stegostoma tigrinum	Zebra shark	Chondrichthyes	462	XP_048398267.1	196	30%	40%
Callorhinchus milii	Australian ghostshark	Chondrichthyes	462	XP_007888000.1	220	29%	35%
