= SPEF2 =

Gene

Identifiers
- Aliases: SPEF2, CT122, KPL2, sperm flagellar 2, SPGF43
- External IDs: OMIM: 610172; MGI: 2443727; HomoloGene: 23371; GeneCards: SPEF2; OMA:SPEF2 - orthologs

Gene location (Human)
Chr.	Chromosome 5 (human)
Band	5p13.2	Start	35,617,844 bp
Band	5p13.2	End	35,814,611 bp

Gene location (Mouse)
Chr.	Chromosome 15 (mouse)
Band	15|15 A1	Start	9,578,279 bp
Band	15|15 A1	End	9,748,954 bp
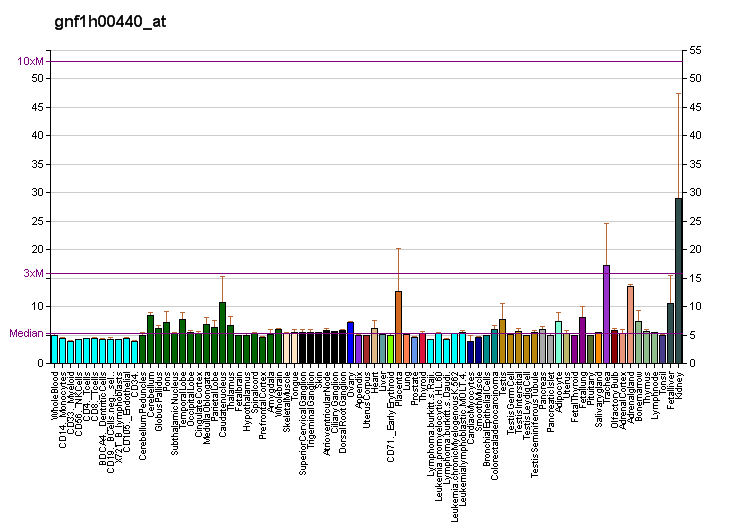

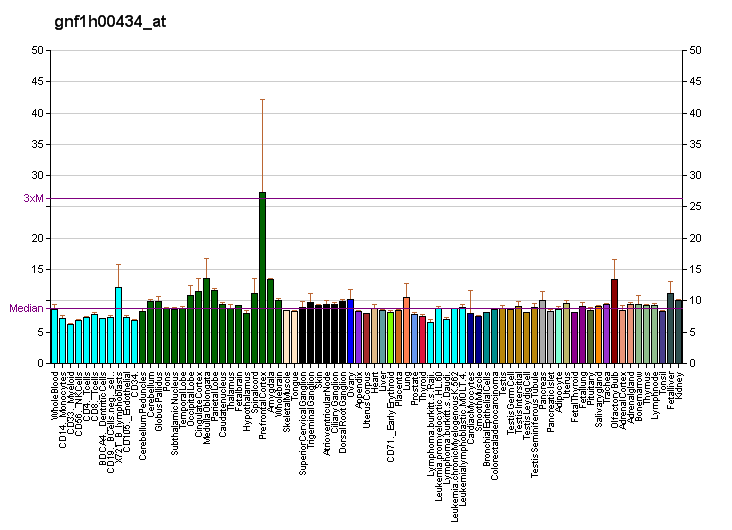
RNA expression pattern
Bgee	Human / Mouse (ortholog); Top expressed in: right uterine tube; bronchial epithelial cell; mucosa of paranasal sinus; sperm; canal of the cervix; Achilles tendon; olfactory zone of nasal mucosa; body of uterus; caput epididymis; sural nerve / Top expressed in: olfactory epithelium; spermatid; spermatocyte; seminiferous tubule; embryo; embryo; Epithelium of choroid plexus; granulocyte; vestibular labyrinth; right lung; More reference expression data
BioGPS	More reference expression data
Orthologs
Species	Human	Mouse
Entrez	79925	320277
Ensembl	ENSG00000152582	ENSMUSG00000072663
UniProt	Q9C093	Q8C9J3
RefSeq (mRNA)	NM_024867; NM_144722	NM_177123; NM_001305042; NM_001305044
RefSeq (protein)	NP_079143; NP_653323	NP_001291971; NP_001291973; NP_796097
Location (UCSC)	Chr 5: 35.62 – 35.81 Mb	Chr 15: 9.58 – 9.75 Mb
PubMed search
- Wikidata
View/Edit Human	View/Edit Mouse

Sperm flagellar protein 2 is a protein that in humans is encoded by the SPEF2 gene.

SPEF2 plays an important role in spermatogenesis and flagellar assembly. SPEF2 is expressed in all ciliated cells and is required for cilia function. Sperm contain cilia, and a mutation in the SPEF2 gene can cause male infertility due to immobile sperm. In a pig animal model, a SPEF2 mutation affects the sperm tail development. And a loss of function mutation in SPEF2 in mice causes the big giant head phenotype. SPEF2 mRNA and protein products are localized in germ and sertoli cells. Within these cells, SPEF2 is localized in the golgi complex, manchette, basal body and mid piece of the sperm tail. SPEF2 has been shown to interact with the intracellular transport protein IFT20 in the testis.
