= IFT81 =

Identifiers
- Aliases: IFT81, CDV-1, CDV-1R, CDV1, CDV1R, DV1, intraflagellar transport 81, SRTD19
- External IDs: OMIM: 605489; MGI: 1098597; GeneCards: IFT81

Gene location (Human)
| Chr. | Chromosome 12 (human) |
| Band | 12q24.11 | Start | 110,124,335 bp |
| Band | 12q24.11 | End | 110,218,793 bp |

Gene location (Mouse)
| Chr. | Chromosome 5 (mouse) |
| Band | 5 F|5 62.44 cM | Start | 122,688,267 bp |
| Band | 5 F|5 62.44 cM | End | 122,752,581 bp |
RNA expression pattern
| Bgee | Human / Mouse (ortholog); Top expressed in: bronchial epithelial cell; ventricular zone; right uterine tube; ganglionic eminence; Achilles tendon; olfactory zone of nasal mucosa; testicle; Epithelium of choroid plexus; left testis; right testis / Top expressed in: spermatid; saccule; spermatocyte; neural layer of retina; interventricular septum; genital tubercle; otic vesicle; vestibular sensory epithelium; right ventricle; olfactory epithelium; More reference expression data |
| BioGPS | n/a |
Gene ontology
| Molecular function | tubulin binding; protein binding |
| Cellular component | intraciliary transport particle B; ciliary basal body; centrosome; sperm principal piece; cell projection; ciliary tip; motile cilium; sperm midpiece; cilium |
| Biological process | cell projection organization; spermatogenesis; intraciliary transport; intraciliary transport involved in cilium assembly; cilium assembly; regulation of smoothened signaling pathway |
Sources:Amigo / QuickGO
Orthologs
| Databases | NCBI: entry; OMA: entry |
| Species | Human | Mouse |
| Entrez | 28981 | 12589 |
| Ensembl | ENSG00000122970 | ENSMUSG00000029469 |
| UniProt | Q8WYA0 | O35594 |
| RefSeq (mRNA) | NM_001143779; NM_014055; NM_031473; NM_001347946; NM_001347947 NM_001347948 | NM_009879; NM_001358917; NM_001358918; NM_001358919 |
| RefSeq (protein) | NP_001137251; NP_054774; NP_113661; NP_001334875; NP_001334876 NP_001334877; NP_001137251.1; NP_054774.2 | NP_034009; NP_001345846; NP_001345847; NP_001345848 |
| Location (UCSC) | Chr 12: 110.12 – 110.22 Mb | Chr 5: 122.69 – 122.75 Mb |
| PubMed search |
- Wikidata
| View/Edit Human | View/Edit Mouse |

Intraflagellar transport protein 81 homolog is a protein that in humans is encoded by the IFT81 gene. Together with IFT74/72 it forms a core complex to build IFT particles which are required for cilium formation. Additionally, it interacts with basal body components as CEP170 which regulates the disassembly of the cilium.
