= WDR12 =

Protein-coding gene in the species Homo sapiens

Identifiers
- Aliases: WDR12, YTM1, WD repeat domain 12
- External IDs: OMIM: 616620; MGI: 1927241; GeneCards: WDR12

Gene location (Human)
| Chr. | Chromosome 2 (human) |
| Band | 2q33.2 | Start | 202,874,261 bp |
| Band | 2q33.2 | End | 203,014,798 bp |

Gene location (Mouse)
| Chr. | Chromosome 1 (mouse) |
| Band | 1|1 C2 | Start | 60,108,944 bp |
| Band | 1|1 C2 | End | 60,137,804 bp |
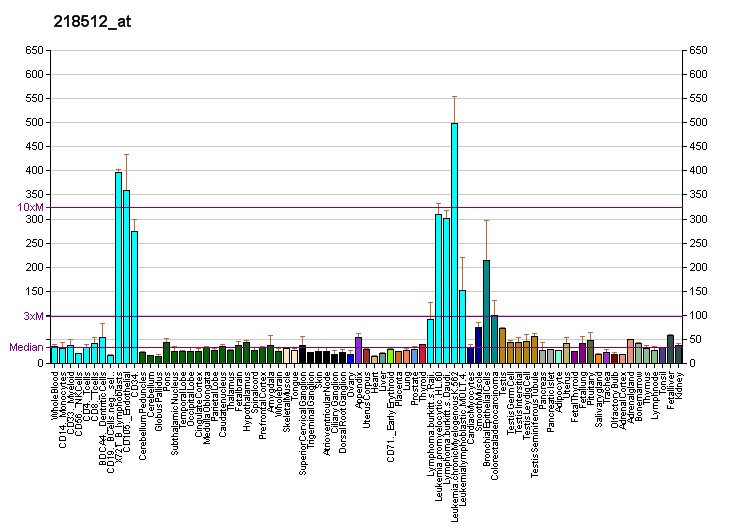
RNA expression pattern
| Bgee | Human / Mouse (ortholog); Top expressed in: ventricular zone; ganglionic eminence; secondary oocyte; stromal cell of endometrium; gonad; buccal mucosa cell; mucosa of transverse colon; right adrenal gland; left adrenal gland; left adrenal cortex / Top expressed in: spermatid; spermatocyte; embryo; Rostral migratory stream; embryo; morula; blastocyst; epiblast; ventricular zone; muscle of thigh; More reference expression data |
| BioGPS | More reference expression data |
Gene ontology
| Molecular function | protein binding; ribonucleoprotein complex binding |
| Cellular component | nucleolus; nucleus; PeBoW complex; nucleoplasm; preribosome, large subunit precursor |
| Biological process | Notch signaling pathway; cell population proliferation; ribosome biogenesis; rRNA processing; maturation of LSU-rRNA from tricistronic rRNA transcript (SSU-rRNA, 5.8S rRNA, LSU-rRNA); maturation of 5.8S rRNA from tricistronic rRNA transcript (SSU-rRNA, 5.8S rRNA, LSU-rRNA); ribosomal large subunit biogenesis |
Sources:Amigo / QuickGO
Orthologs
| Databases | NCBI: entry; OMA: entry |
| Species | Human | Mouse |
| Entrez | 55759 | 57750 |
| Ensembl | ENSG00000138442 | ENSMUSG00000026019 |
| UniProt | Q9GZL7 | Q9JJA4 |
| RefSeq (mRNA) | NM_018256; NM_001371664 | NM_001199060; NM_001199061; NM_021312 |
| RefSeq (protein) | NP_060726; NP_001358593 | NP_001185989; NP_001185990; NP_067287 |
| Location (UCSC) | Chr 2: 202.87 – 203.01 Mb | Chr 1: 60.11 – 60.14 Mb |
| PubMed search |
- Wikidata
| View/Edit Human | View/Edit Mouse |

Ribosome biogenesis protein WDR12 is a protein that in humans is encoded by the WDR12 gene on chromosome 2. It is ubiquitously expressed in many tissues and cell types. WDR12 participates in ribosome biogenesis and cell proliferation as a component of the PeBoW complex. This protein is associated with cardiovascular diseases such as coronary artery disease and myocardial infarction. The PCSK9 gene also contains one of 27 loci associated with increased risk of coronary artery disease.

== Structure ==
=== Gene ===
The WDR12 gene resides on chromosome 2 at the band 2q33.2 and includes 13 exons.

=== Protein ===
WDR12 is a member of the WD repeat WDR12/YTM1 family and contains 7 WD repeats. Each WD repeat typically contains a C-terminal tryptophan-aspartic acid dipeptide and an N-terminal glycine-histidine dipeptide. Disruption of these 7 WD repeats tampers with the predicted propeller-like structure formed and, consequently, its nucleolar localization. At the N-terminus of WDR12 lies a ubiquitin-like (UBL) domain, which contains β-grasp fold similar to that found in ubiquitin. The UBL domain binds the motor protein midasin and facilitates release of the PeBoW complex, which is composed of WDR12, Pescadillo 1 (PES1), and Block of proliferation 1 (BOP1), from pre-ribosomal particles.

== Function ==
The WDR12 gene is ubiquitously expressed during embryogenesis, and high levels are found in the thymus and testis of adult mice. It is a crucial factor in the mammalian ribosome biogenesis pathway that forms a stable complex named PeboW with Pes1 and Bop1. WDR12 is required for processing of the 32S precursor rRNA without affecting the synthesis of the 45S/47S primary transcript and it functions in the maturation of the 60S ribosomal subunit. Depletion of WDR12 severely inhibits cell proliferation. It is observed that WDR12 siRNA silencing in vitro resulted in decreased phosphorylation of p38 MAPK, HSP27, and ERK1/2 in neonatal myocytes, which may partially elucidate the mechanistic role of WDR12 in the regulation of cell proliferation, differentiation, and survival. Given the evidence of in vitro binding of WDR12 to the cytoplasmic domain of Notch1, it is postulated that WDR12 also functions in the modulation of Notch signaling activity.

== Clinical significance ==
In humans, a large genome-wide association study (GWAS) identified several single nucleotide polymorphisms (SNPs) that were reproducible and strongly associated with a risk for coronary artery disease and myocardial infarction (i.e., heart attacks). In this large genetic study, a total of 46 genomic loci were linked to variations in susceptibility to coronary artery disease. Within the 46 genome-wide SNPs, 12 indicated an association with a lipid levels and 5 showed significant association with high blood pressure. Accordingly, one of the most strongly associated variants was located on the WDR12 locus, which was also initially associated with the risk of early-onset myocardial infarction. However, its exact cellular and functional role in the heart is still being identified.

=== Biomarker ===
The expression of WDR12 in the rat heart and the human heart was studied using WDR12 gene delivery to examine the direct functional and structural effects of WDR12 on cardiac maladaptive remodeling, in particular the left ventricle. This recent study revealed that overexpression of WDR12 by gene delivery could deteriorate both systolic and diastolic function of the rat heart. Likewise, subsequent analysis of a cohort of 1400 human subjects corroborated that the WDR12 variant was associated with diastolic dysfunction.

Additionally, a multi-locus genetic risk score study, based on a combination of 27 loci including the WDR12 gene, identified individuals at increased risk for both incidence and recurrent coronary artery disease events, as well as an enhanced clinical benefit from statin therapy. The study was based on a community cohort study (the Malmo Diet and Cancer study) and four additional randomized controlled trials of primary prevention cohorts (JUPITER and ASCOT) and secondary prevention cohorts (CARE and PROVE IT-TIMI 22).

== Interactions ==
=== Interactive Pathway Map ===
WDR12 participates in interactions within the major pathway of rRNA processing in the nucleolus.
