= Asphyxiating thoracic dysplasia =

Rare genetic disorder

- Other names: Jeune syndrome, asphyxiating thoracic chondrodystrophy, infantile thoracic dystrophy
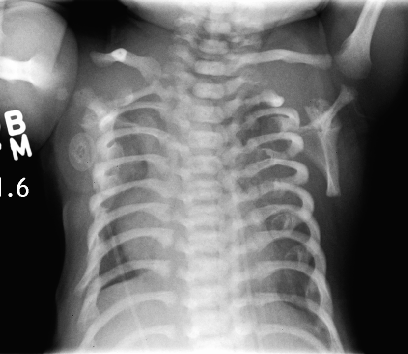
- CXR of a newborn with asphyxiating thoracic dysplasia. Note the short ribs.
- Specialty: Medical genetics
- Symptoms: Narrow chest, short ribs, shortened bones of the arms and legs, unusually shaped pelvis, and extra fingers and/or toes
- Treatment: Mechanical ventilation, endotracheal suctioning, postural drainage, Vertical expandable prosthetic titanium rib (VEPTR), Lateral thoracic expansion, or other chest reconstruction surgeries.
- Frequency: 1 in 100,000 to 130,000
- Deaths: Mortality of affected: 60-70%

Asphyxiating thoracic dysplasia (ATD), also known as Jeune syndrome, is a rare inherited bone growth disorder (autosomal recessive skeletal dysplasia) that primarily affects the thoracic region. It was first described in 1955 by the French pediatrician Mathis Jeune. Common signs and symptoms can include a narrow chest, short ribs, shortened bones in the arms and legs, short stature, and extra fingers and toes (polydactyly). The restricted growth and expansion of the lungs caused by this disorder results in life-threatening breathing difficulties; occurring in 1 in every 100,000-130,000 live births in the United States.

People who are affected with this disorder live short lives either only into infancy or early childhood. If they live beyond childhood, breathing problems can improve with age, but there is a possibility of developing severe kidney or heart problems. Several mutations in different genes such as IFT80, DYNC2H1, WDR19, IFT140 and TTC21B have been identified in some families with the condition as possible causes of the disorder. Treatment is based on the signs and symptoms present in each person.

== Types ==
Type	OMIM	Gene	Locus
ATD1	208500	?	15q13
ATD2	611263	IFT80	3q
ATD3	613091	DYNC2H1	11q

== Signs and symptoms ==
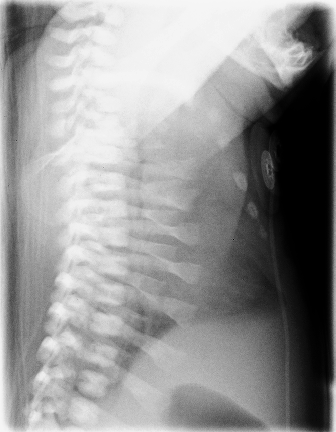
Lateral CXR of the same person above

Jeune syndrome is a rare genetic disorder that affects the way a child's cartilage and bones develop. It begins before the child is born and primarily affects the child's rib cage, pelvis, arms and legs. Usually, problems with the rib cage cause the most serious health problems for children with Jeune syndrome. Their rib cages (thorax) are smaller and narrower than usual, which inhibits the child's lungs from developing fully or expanding when they inhale. The child may breathe rapidly and shallowly. They may have trouble breathing when they have an upper or lower respiratory infection, like pneumonia. Breathing trouble can range from mild to severe. In some children, it is not noticeable, aside from fast breathing; however, in others, breathing problems can be fatal. About 60% to 70% of children with this condition die from respiratory failure as babies or young children. Children with Jeune syndrome who survive often develop problems with their kidneys, and over time they may experience kidney failure. As a result, few children with Jeune syndrome live into their teen years. Children with Jeune syndrome have a form of dwarfism. They are short in stature, and their arms and legs are shorter than most people's.

== Diagnosis ==
Jeune syndrome is a rare autosomal recessive ciliopathy. This diagnosis is grouped with other chest problems called thoracic insufficiency syndrome (TIS). Diagnosis of Jeune syndrome can be made as early as before birth if signs and symptoms are apparent on an ultrasound; however, diagnosis after birth usually occurs through X-rays and genetic testing, such as the tests found on the Genetic Testing Registry (GTR).

== Treatment ==
=== Medical care ===
In order to help relieve respiratory distress, mechanical ventilation is required in most severe cases; while pulmonary infections that tend to lead to respiratory failure occur in less severe cases. In order to treat these infections, doctors may suggest antibiotics, endotracheal suctioning, or postural drainage.

=== Surgical care ===
In severe cases, surgical action is needed; otherwise, failure to intervene can result in pulmonary damage and eventual fatality. Vertical expandable prosthetic titanium rib (VEPTR) surgery is the most common treatment for severe chest wall deformities. During this procedure, one or more titanium rods are attached to the ribs near the spine, which allow space for the patient's lungs to develop. Small adjustments are made every four to six months through a small incision in the patient's back. Alternatively, lateral thoracic expansion is used to enlarge the chest wall by separating the ribs from their periosteum and covering them with titanium struts. This procedure is common among patients older than a year due to its safe and effective outcome. Chest reconstruction is another surgical procedure that promotes thoracic cage growth. It can be done as an enlargement of the thoracic cage by sternotomy and fixation with bone grafts, or a methylmethacrylate prostheses plate.
