= IFT140 =

Protein-coding gene in the species Homo sapiens

Identifiers
- Aliases: IFT140, MZSDS, SRTD9, WDTC2, c305C8.4, c380F5.1, gs114, intraflagellar transport 140, RP80
- External IDs: OMIM: 614620; MGI: 2146906; GeneCards: IFT140

Gene location (Human)
Chr.	Chromosome 16 (human)
Band	16p13.3	Start	1,510,427 bp
Band	16p13.3	End	1,612,072 bp

Gene location (Mouse)
Chr.	Chromosome 17 (mouse)
Band	17|17 A3.3	Start	25,235,059 bp
Band	17|17 A3.3	End	25,318,469 bp
RNA expression pattern
Bgee	Human / Mouse (ortholog); Top expressed in: right uterine tube; right lobe of thyroid gland; left lobe of thyroid gland; left testis; right testis; ventricular zone; anterior pituitary; stromal cell of endometrium; olfactory zone of nasal mucosa; bronchial epithelial cell / Top expressed in: fetal liver hematopoietic progenitor cell; spermatocyte; spermatid; seminiferous tubule; tibiofemoral joint; human fetus; blood; external carotid artery; internal carotid artery; medullary collecting duct; More reference expression data
BioGPS	n/a
Gene ontology
Molecular function	molecular function; protein binding
Cellular component	cytoplasm; ciliary basal body; centrosome; cell projection; photoreceptor outer segment; intraciliary transport particle A; photoreceptor connecting cilium; microtubule organizing center; ciliary tip; axoneme; cytoskeleton; cilium; non-motile cilium
Biological process	renal system development; cilium assembly; limb morphogenesis; intraciliary transport; skeletal system morphogenesis; photoreceptor cell outer segment organization; neural tube patterning; regulation of smoothened signaling pathway; development of the heart; determination of left/right symmetry; cell projection organization; retina development in camera-type eye; protein localization to cilium; regulation of cilium assembly; intraciliary retrograde transport; embryonic camera-type eye development; intraciliary transport involved in cilium assembly; embryonic digit morphogenesis; embryonic cranial skeleton morphogenesis; non-motile cilium assembly; embryonic brain development
Sources:Amigo / QuickGO
Orthologs
Databases	NCBI: entry; OMA: entry
Species	Human	Mouse
Entrez	9742	106633
Ensembl	ENSG00000187535	ENSMUSG00000024169
UniProt	Q96RY7	E9PY46
RefSeq (mRNA)	NM_014714	NM_134126
RefSeq (protein)	NP_055529	NP_598887
Location (UCSC)	Chr 16: 1.51 – 1.61 Mb	Chr 17: 25.24 – 25.32 Mb
PubMed search
- Wikidata
View/Edit Human	View/Edit Mouse

IFT140, Intraflagellar transport 140 homolog, is a protein that in humans is encoded by the IFT140 gene. The gene product forms a core component of IFT-A complex which is indipensible for retrograde intraflagellar transport within the primary cilium.

== Clinical significance ==
Mutations in this gene have been associated to cases of skeletal ciliopathy called Mainzer Saldino Syndrome, characterised by skeletal developmental anomalies, retinal degeneration and a fibrocystic renal disease known as nephronophthisis. It has also been described in patients with Jeune Syndrome and isolated Lebers congenital amaurosis in the absence of other syndromic features.

== Model organisms ==
An ENU derived mouse (cauli) carrying homozygous IFT140 alleles (c.2564T>A, p. I855K) was generated at the Murdoch Children's Research Institute in Melbourne, Australia. The cauli mouse presented with mid-gestational lethality, exencephaly, spina bifida, craniofacial dysmorphism, digital anomalies, cardiac anomalies and somite patterning defects. Ectopic hedgehog signalling was demonstrated by wholemount in situ hybridisation in the limb buds and abnormal morphology of the primary cilium within the limb bud was demonstrated by scanning electron microscopy.

A patient with Mainzer Saldino Syndrome carrying compound heterozygous variants in IFT140 had induced pluripotent stem cells reprogrammed and CRISPR gene corrected before differentiating both stem cell lines into kidney organoids for transcriptional comparison. Aside from validating the club shaped morphology of the primary cilia seen in the cauli mouse limb bud within the regenerated nephron tubules of the IFT140^{c.634G>A/c.2176C>G} organoids compared to the IFT140^{WT/c.2176C>G}, bulk RNA sequencing comparison demonstrated significant differences in gene pathways related to apicobasal polarity, cell-cell junctions and axonemal dynein assembly.
