= BOP1 =

Protein-coding gene in the species Homo sapiens

Identifiers
- Aliases: BOP1, block of proliferation 1, BOP1 ribosomal biogenesis factor
- External IDs: OMIM: 610596; MGI: 1334460; GeneCards: BOP1

Gene location (Human)
Chr.	Chromosome 8 (human)
Band	8q24.3	Start	144,262,045 bp
Band	8q24.3	End	144,291,438 bp

Gene location (Mouse)
Chr.	Chromosome 15 (mouse)
Band	15 D3|15 35.91 cM	Start	76,337,189 bp
Band	15 D3|15 35.91 cM	End	76,361,477 bp
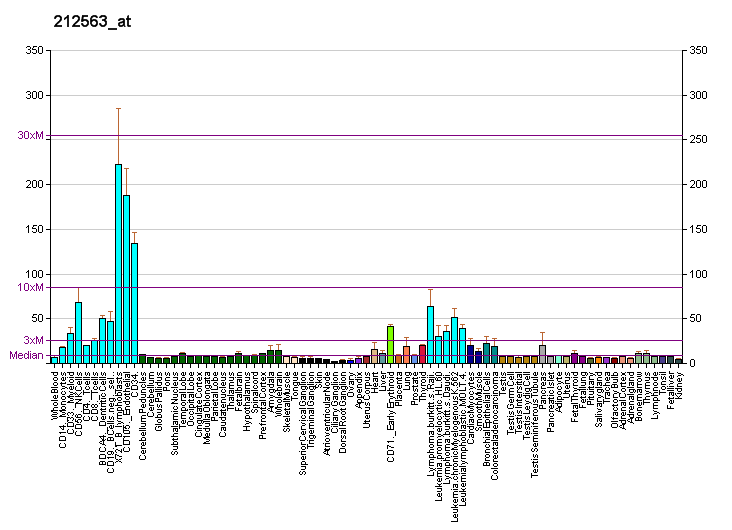

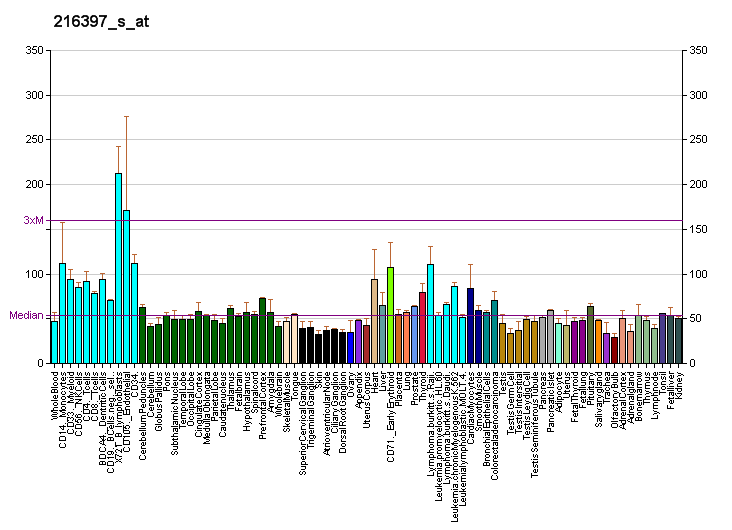
RNA expression pattern
Bgee	Human / Mouse (ortholog); Top expressed in: right lobe of thyroid gland; right hemisphere of cerebellum; left lobe of thyroid gland; pituitary gland; anterior pituitary; right uterine tube; gastrocnemius muscle; right frontal lobe; mucosa of transverse colon; apex of heart / Top expressed in: otic placode; saccule; otic vesicle; epiblast; somite; embryo; embryo; yolk sac; primitive streak; mandibular prominence; More reference expression data
BioGPS	More reference expression data
Gene ontology
Molecular function	ribonucleoprotein complex binding; protein binding; RNA binding
Cellular component	nucleolus; nucleus; PeBoW complex; nucleoplasm; preribosome, large subunit precursor; ribonucleoprotein complex
Biological process	ribosomal large subunit biogenesis; cleavage in ITS2 between 5.8S rRNA and LSU-rRNA of tricistronic rRNA transcript (SSU-rRNA, 5.8S rRNA, LSU-rRNA); cell population proliferation; ribosome biogenesis; regulation of cell cycle; rRNA processing; maturation of LSU-rRNA from tricistronic rRNA transcript (SSU-rRNA, 5.8S rRNA, LSU-rRNA); ribosomal large subunit assembly; regulation of signal transduction by p53 class mediator; maturation of 5.8S rRNA from tricistronic rRNA transcript (SSU-rRNA, 5.8S rRNA, LSU-rRNA)
Sources:Amigo / QuickGO
Orthologs
Databases	NCBI: entry; OMA: entry
Species	Human	Mouse
Entrez	23246	12181
Ensembl	ENSG00000261236; ENSG00000285301	ENSMUSG00000022557
UniProt	Q14137	P97452
RefSeq (mRNA)	NM_015201	NM_013481
RefSeq (protein)	NP_056016	NP_038509
Location (UCSC)	Chr 8: 144.26 – 144.29 Mb	Chr 15: 76.34 – 76.36 Mb
PubMed search
- Wikidata
View/Edit Human	View/Edit Mouse

Ribosome biogenesis protein BOP1 is a protein that in humans is encoded by the BOP1 gene. It is a WD40 repeat-containing nucleolar protein involved in rRNA processing, thereby controlling the cell cycle. It is required for the maturation of the 25S and 5.8S ribosomal RNAs. It may serve as an essential factor in ribosome formation that coordinates processing of the spacer regions in pre-rRNA.

== Function ==
The Pes1-Bop1 complex has several components: BOP1, GRWD1, PES1, ORC6L, and RPL3 and is involved in ribosome biogenesis and altered chromosome segregation. The overexpression of BOP1 increases the percentage of multipolar spindles in human cells. Deregulation of the BOP1 pathway may contribute to colorectal tumourigenesis in humans. Elevated levels of Bop1 induces Bop1/WDR12 and Bop1/Pes1 subcomplexes and the assembly and integrity of the PeBoW complex is highly sensitive to changes in Bop1 protein levels.

Nop7p-Erb1p-Ytm1p, found in yeast, is potentially the homologous complex of Pes1-Bop1-WDR12 as it is involved in the control of ribosome biogenesis and S phase entry. The integrity of the PeBoW complex is required for ribosome biogenesis and cell proliferation in mammalian cells. In Giardia, the species specific cytoskeleton protein, beta-giardin, interacts with Bop1.

== Structure ==
BOP1NT

Identifiers
- Symbol: BOP1NT
- Pfam: PF08145
- InterPro: IPR012953
Available protein structures:
- PDB: IPR012953 PF08145 (ECOD; PDBsum)
- AlphaFold: IPR012953; PF08145

BOP1 contains a conserved N-terminal domain, BOP1NT.
