= CBY =

CBY, or cby, may refer to the following:

- Burnelli CBY-3, a transport aircraft built in Canada in 1944
- CBY, the IATA code for Canobie Airport in the state of Queensland, Australia
- Canterbury railway station, Melbourne
- cby, the ISO 639-3 code for the Carabayo language spoken in the Amazonian region of Colombia
- CBY, the National Rail code for Charlbury railway station in the county of Oxfordshire, United Kingdom
- CBY (AM), a radio station broadcasting from Corner Brook, Newfoundland and Labrador, Canada
- CBY1, a gene that encodes for the protein chibby homolog 1
