= Hydrogenobody =

Organel for methanogenesis in ruminants

Methane formation in the cow's stomach, in the rumen

A hydrogenobody (HB) is a single-membraned oval-shaped organelle found in rumen ciliates. This organelle is responsible for the methane production of ruminants such as cows. The organelles, which were discovered in 2026, are found at the base of the cilia of the ciliates, where they provide energy for the movement of the cilia.

== Rumen ==
Inside the rumen, tens of millions of bacteria feed on scraps of fiber, starch, and other nutrients, and break down cellulose and proteins. There are also microbial fungi, whose enzymes digest stiff cell walls. All these organisms are fed upon by ciliates: large, predatory eukaryotic microbes. The products of this breakdown of nutrients are used for the metabolism of the cow. The byproducts of fermentation, hydrogen gas (H_{2}) and carbon dioxide (CO_{2}), are used by methanogens, whose waste product is methane (CH_{4}), a powerful heat-trapping greenhouse gas.

== Methane production ==
Ruminant agriculture (including cattle, sheep, goats, and deer) accounts for ~30% of global anthropogenic methane emissions. This is mostly due to anaerobic fermentation in the rumen. The methane gas produced by cattle, together with methane from landfills and from fossil fuels, is responsible for 30% of the rise in temperature during the past 150 years. Since this gas, CH_{4}, decays more quickly than CO_{2}, there exists great scientific interest in the metabolism of cattle. This led to the discovery of the hydrogenobody, an organelle that produces hydrogen gas which is turned into methane by the methanogens.

The largest single-celled organisms in the rumen are the ciliates. They feed on smaller microbes like bacteria and fungi that are moved into the oral groove towards the cytostome by the cilia. This movement of numerous cilia costs energy. The creation of this energy causes hydrogen gas to be released which is then consumed by bacteria and archaea including methanogens.

Some animals, even if they have the same diet, emit more methane then other animals of the same species within the same flock. This difference depends on the different amount of ciliates harboured in the rumen. Some, like Dasytricha, can be present in high quantities in different sheep of the same flock, which can cause these animals to release 100 times more methane then the other sheep.

== Enzymes ==
The most abundant ciliate in the rumen is the species Entodinium caudatum whose genus forms 90% of the rumen ciliates of all livestock. It was shown in these ciliates that some of the enzymes indirectly involved in methane production, mainly hydrogenases that catalyze the formation of hydrogen gas, were different from all known enzymes with the same function. Also their location was unusual sitting at the edge of the cell membrane. The electronic microscope revealed that the hydrogenases were situated close to the cell membrane at the base of the cilia enclosed in single-membraned organelles, called hydrogenobodies. These organelles provide energy to the cilia.

The hydrogenobody is delimited by a single membrane and should not be mistaken for hydrogenosomes that have double membranes, since the latter are derived from mitochondria. Hydrogenosomes, like mitochondria, float in the cytoplasm, while hydrogenobodies are located at the base of the cilia, just below the cell membrane. Hydrogenobodies and hydrogenosomes must therefore have different evolutionary origins although they may have the same functions.

The hydrogenase enzymes in the hydrogenobody produce hydrogen. The hydrogenobody also has a Flavodiiron Oxygen Reductase that allows the organelle to consume trace oxygen, forming water and protecting both the own oxygen-sensitive hydrogenases and the strictly anaerobic methanogens on the ciliate's outer surface. All the produced hydrogen is used by methanogenic archaea.
