= Thoracic insufficiency syndrome =

- Specialty: Pulmonology

Thoracic insufficiency syndrome is the inability of the thorax to support normal respiration. It is frequently associated with chest and/or spinal abnormalities. Treatment options are limited, but include supportive pulmonary care and surgical options (thoracoplasty and/or implantation of vertical expandable prosthetic titanium rib (VEPTR) devices).
