= ERB1 =

Protein

Identifiers
- Symbol: ERB1
- NCBI gene: 855068
- UniProt: Q04660
Search for
- Structures: Swiss-model
- Domains: InterPro

Erb1 also known as the eukaryotic ribosome biogenesis protein 1 is a yeast protein required for maturation of the 25S and 5.8S ribosomal RNAs. It is a component of 66S pre-ribosomal particles and is homologous to the human protein BOP1.
