= Protein chibby homolog 1 =

Protein-coding gene in humans

CBY1
Available structures
PDB	Ortholog search: PDBe RCSB
PDB	List of PDB id codes 4WRQ

Identifiers
- Aliases: CBY1, C22orf2, CBY, HS508I15A, PGEA1, PIGEA-14, PIGEA14, arb1, chibby homolog 1 (Drosophila), chibby family member 1, beta catenin antagonist, Chibby1
- External IDs: OMIM: 607757; MGI: 1920989; HomoloGene: 12514; GeneCards: CBY1; OMA:CBY1 - orthologs

Gene location (Human)
Chr.	Chromosome 22 (human)
Band	22q13.1	Start	38,656,636 bp
Band	22q13.1	End	38,673,854 bp

Gene location (Mouse)
Chr.	Chromosome 15 (mouse)
Band	15 E1|15	Start	79,543,400 bp
Band	15 E1|15	End	79,551,861 bp
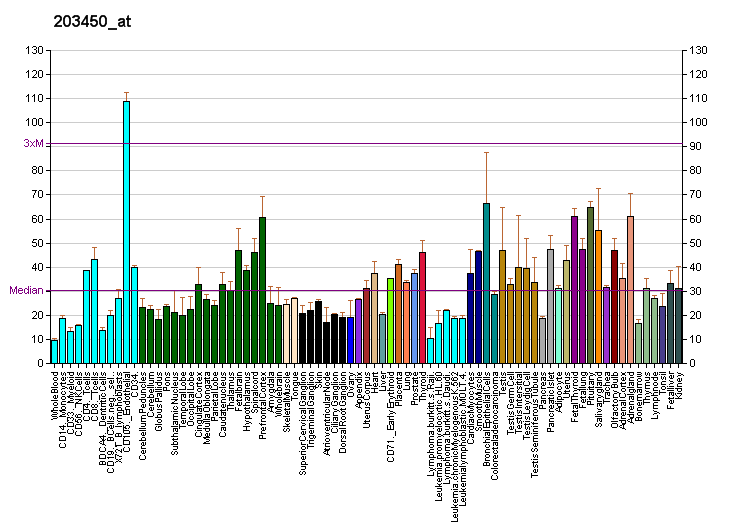
RNA expression pattern
Bgee	Human / Mouse (ortholog); Top expressed in: oocyte; secondary oocyte; right uterine tube; tendon of biceps brachii; epithelium of bronchus; bronchial epithelial cell; muscle layer of sigmoid colon; apex of heart; ventricular zone; right auricle of heart / Top expressed in: spermatocyte; interventricular septum; ventricular zone; medial ganglionic eminence; seminiferous tubule; neural tube; dentate gyrus of hippocampal formation granule cell; neural layer of retina; visual cortex; granulocyte; More reference expression data
BioGPS	More reference expression data
Gene ontology
Molecular function	beta-catenin binding; protein binding; identical protein binding; protein homodimerization activity
Cellular component	cytosol; trans-Golgi network; Golgi apparatus; nuclear speck; nucleus; nucleoplasm; cytoplasm; centriole; cytoskeleton; cell projection; ciliary basal body
Biological process	protein localization; cardiac muscle cell differentiation; negative regulation of Wnt signaling pathway; cell differentiation; negative regulation of transcription, DNA-templated; fat cell differentiation; cell projection organization; protein homotetramerization; cilium assembly; ciliary transition zone assembly
Sources:Amigo / QuickGO
Orthologs
Species	Human	Mouse
Entrez	25776	73739
Ensembl	ENSG00000100211	ENSMUSG00000022428
UniProt	Q9Y3M2	Q9D1C2
RefSeq (mRNA)	NM_015373; NM_001002880	NM_028634
RefSeq (protein)	NP_001002880; NP_056188	NP_082910
Location (UCSC)	Chr 22: 38.66 – 38.67 Mb	Chr 15: 79.54 – 79.55 Mb
PubMed search
- Wikidata
View/Edit Human	View/Edit Mouse

Protein chibby homolog 1 is a protein that in humans is encoded by the CBY1 gene.

== Function ==
Beta-catenin is a transcriptional activator and oncoprotein involved in the development of several cancers. The protein encoded by this gene interacts directly with the C-terminal region of beta-catenin, inhibiting oncogenic beta-catenin-mediated transcriptional activation by competing with transcription factors for binding to beta-catenin. Two transcript variants encoding different isoforms have been found for this gene.

== Interactions ==
CBY1 has been shown to interact with Beta-catenin. CBY1 has also been shown to interact with CEP164, CIBAR1 (FAM92A1), and RAB8A.
