= DYNC2H1 =

Protein-coding gene in humans

Identifiers
- Aliases: DYNC2H1, ATD3, DHC1b, DHC2, DNCH2, DYH1B, SRPS2B, SRTD3, hdhc11, dynein cytoplasmic 2 heavy chain 1
- External IDs: OMIM: 603297; MGI: 107736; GeneCards: DYNC2H1
Available structures
| PDB | Ortholog search: PDBe RCSB |
| PDB | List of PDB id codes 4RH7 |

Gene location (Human)
| Chr. | Chromosome 11 (human) |
| Band | 11q22.3 | Start | 103,109,410 bp |
| Band | 11q22.3 | End | 103,479,863 bp |

Gene location (Mouse)
| Chr. | Chromosome 9 (mouse) |
| Band | 9 A1|9 | Start | 6,928,503 bp |
| Band | 9 A1|9 | End | 7,184,446 bp |
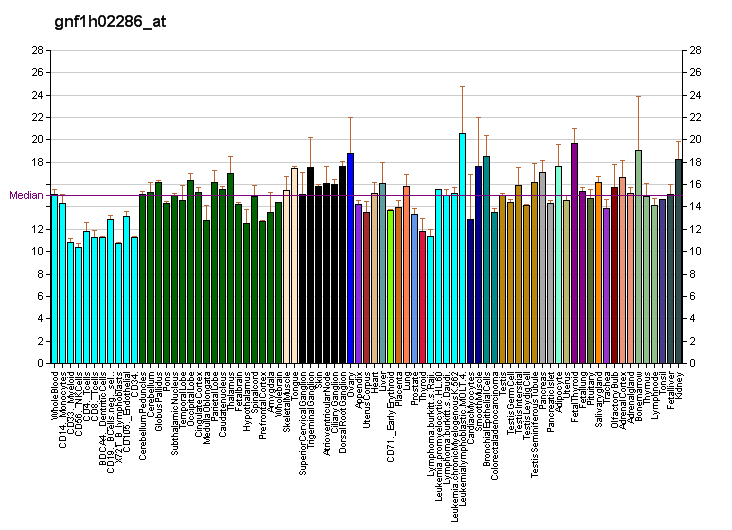

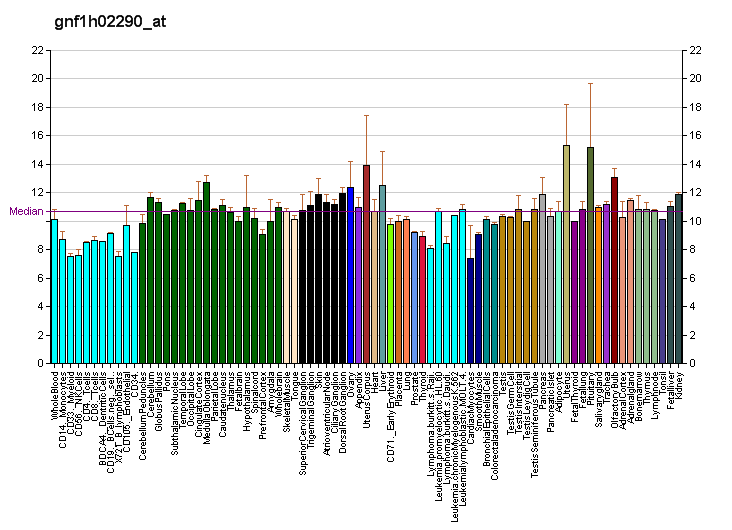

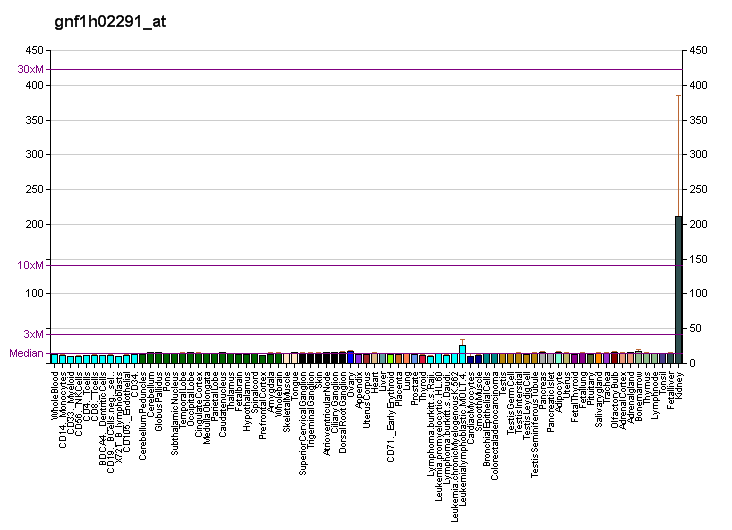
RNA expression pattern
| Bgee | Human / Mouse (ortholog); Top expressed in: secondary oocyte; bronchial epithelial cell; right uterine tube; Achilles tendon; olfactory zone of nasal mucosa; mucosa of paranasal sinus; anterior pituitary; tibia; ventricular zone; testicle / Top expressed in: spermatocyte; spermatid; otolith organ; utricle; superior cervical ganglion; seminiferous tubule; respiratory epithelium; olfactory epithelium; lens; tail of embryo; More reference expression data |
| BioGPS | More reference expression data |
Gene ontology
| Molecular function | microtubule motor activity; nucleotide binding; ATPase activity; cytoskeletal motor activity; ATP binding; minus-end-directed microtubule motor activity; dynein light chain binding; dynein intermediate chain binding; dynein light intermediate chain binding |
| Cellular component | cytoplasm; Golgi apparatus; cell projection; membrane; plasma membrane; ciliary tip; dynein complex; microtubule; extracellular exosome; cytoskeleton; cilium; cytoplasmic dynein complex; apical part of cell; axoneme; motile cilium |
| Biological process | Golgi organization; multicellular organism development; microtubule-based movement; cell projection organization; intraciliary transport involved in cilium assembly; determination of left/right symmetry; development of the heart; dorsal/ventral pattern formation; protein processing; spinal cord motor neuron differentiation; neuron differentiation; embryonic limb morphogenesis; forebrain development; positive regulation of smoothened signaling pathway; coronary vasculature development; non-motile cilium assembly; intraciliary retrograde transport; cilium assembly; protein localization to cilium |
Sources:Amigo / QuickGO
Orthologs
| Databases | NCBI: entry; OMA: entry |
| Species | Human | Mouse |
| Entrez | 79659 | 110350 |
| Ensembl | ENSG00000187240 | ENSMUSG00000047193 |
| UniProt | Q8NCM8 | Q45VK7 |
| RefSeq (mRNA) | NM_001080463; NM_001377; NM_024606 | NM_029851; NM_001364519; NM_138307 |
| RefSeq (protein) | NP_001073932; NP_001368 | NP_084127; NP_001351448 |
| Location (UCSC) | Chr 11: 103.11 – 103.48 Mb | Chr 9: 6.93 – 7.18 Mb |
| PubMed search |
- Wikidata
| View/Edit Human | View/Edit Mouse |

Cytoplasmic dynein 2 heavy chain 1 is a protein that in humans is encoded by the DYNC2H1 gene.

It is associated with short rib–polydactyly syndrome type 3.

It is also associated with asphyxiating thoracic dysplasia.

== See also ==
- dynein
