= CEP164 =

Protein-coding gene in the species Homo sapiens

Identifiers
- Aliases: CEP164, NPHP15, centrosomal protein 164
- External IDs: OMIM: 614848; MGI: 2384878; HomoloGene: 51110; GeneCards: CEP164; OMA:CEP164 - orthologs

Gene location (Human)
Chr.	Chromosome 11 (human)
Band	11q23.3	Start	117,314,557 bp
Band	11q23.3	End	117,413,266 bp

Gene location (Mouse)
Chr.	Chromosome 9 (mouse)
Band	9|9 A5.2	Start	45,678,244 bp
Band	9|9 A5.2	End	45,739,989 bp
RNA expression pattern
Bgee	Human / Mouse (ortholog); Top expressed in: sperm; tendon of biceps brachii; sural nerve; nipple; right uterine tube; bronchial epithelial cell; visceral pleura; left testis; parietal pleura; right testis / Top expressed in: neural layer of retina; secondary oocyte; Rostral migratory stream; internal carotid artery; zygote; spermatid; external carotid artery; ureter; spermatocyte; primary oocyte; More reference expression data
BioGPS	n/a
Gene ontology
Molecular function	protein binding
Cellular component	ciliary transition fiber; cytoplasm; centriole; cytosol; centrosome; cytoskeleton; nucleus; nucleoplasm; extracellular space; nuclear speck; intracellular membrane-bounded organelle
Biological process	cell division; cell cycle; cell projection organization; G2/M transition of mitotic cell cycle; DNA repair; cellular response to DNA damage stimulus; cilium assembly; ciliary basal body-plasma membrane docking; regulation of G2/M transition of mitotic cell cycle
Sources:Amigo / QuickGO
Orthologs
Species	Human	Mouse
Entrez	22897	214552
Ensembl	ENSG00000110274	ENSMUSG00000043987
UniProt	Q9UPV0	Q5DU05
RefSeq (mRNA)	NM_001271933; NM_014956	NM_001081373
RefSeq (protein)	NP_001258862; NP_055771	n/a
Location (UCSC)	Chr 11: 117.31 – 117.41 Mb	Chr 9: 45.68 – 45.74 Mb
PubMed search
- Wikidata
View/Edit Human	View/Edit Mouse

Centrosomal protein of 164 kDa, also known as CEP164, is a protein that in humans is encoded by the CEP164 gene. Its function appears two be twofold: CEP164 is required for primary cilium formation. Furthermore, it is an important component in the response to DNA damage by UV light.
