= Ciliogenesis =

Building of cellular cilia

Details

Identifiers
- Latin: Ciliogenesis
- TH: H1.00.01.1.01033

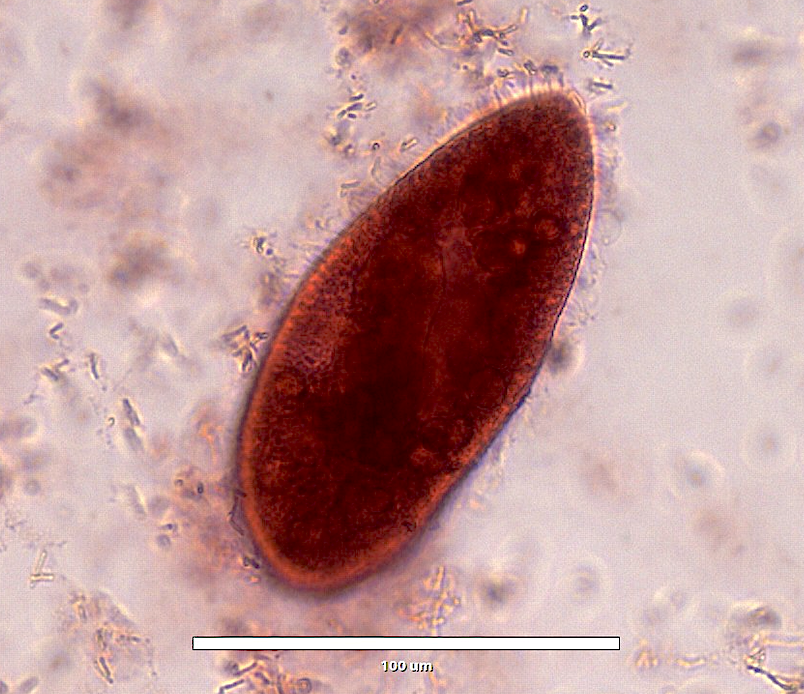
EVOS Imaging depicting a single celled organism with distinctive cilia

Ciliogenesis is defined as the building of the cell's antenna (primary cilia) or extracellular fluid mediation mechanism (motile cilium). It includes the assembly and disassembly of the cilia during the cell cycle. Cilia are important appendages of cells and are involved in numerous activities such as cell signaling, processing developmental signals, and directing the flow of fluids such as mucus over and around cells. Due to the importance of these cell processes, defects in ciliogenesis can lead to numerous human diseases related to non-functioning cilia known as ciliopathies.

== Assembly ==
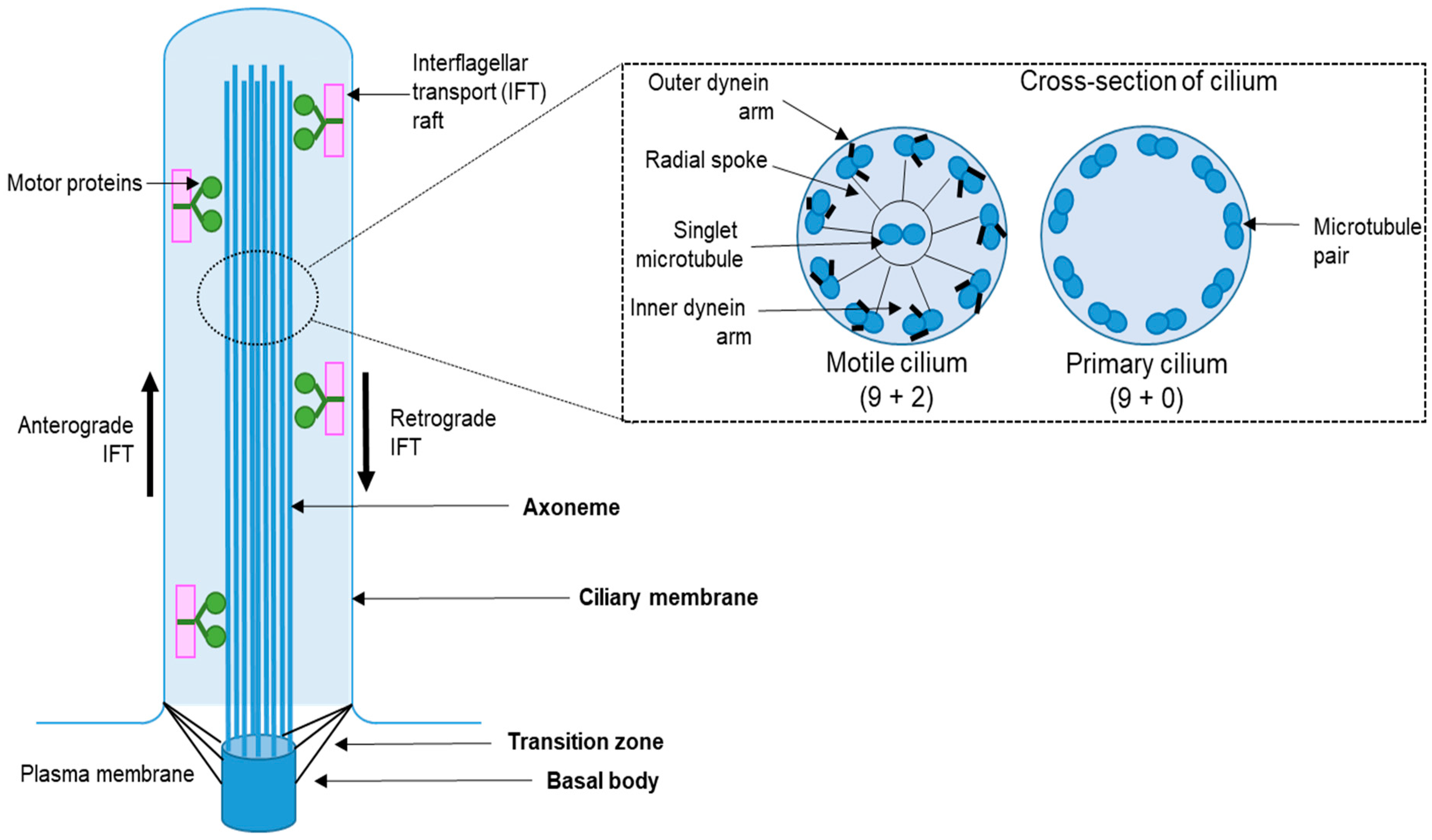
Cilia Structure

Primary cilia are found to be formed when a cell exits the cell cycle. Cilia consist of four main compartments: the basal body at the base, the transition zone, the axenome which is an arrangement of nine doublet microtubules and considered to be the core of the cilium, and the ciliary membrane. Primary cilia contain nine doublet microtubules arranged as a cylinder in their axenome and are denoted as a 9+0 pattern. Motile cilia are denoted as a 9+2 pattern because they contain two extra microtubules in the center of the cylinder that forms the axenome. Due to differences between primary and motile cilia, differences are seen in the formation process.

Ciliogenesis occurs through an ordered set of steps. Basal bodies migrate to the surface of the cell and attach to the cell cortex. Along the way, the basal bodies attach to membrane vesicles that fuse with the plasma membrane of the cell. The alignment of cilia is determined by the positioning and orientation of the basal bodies at this step. Once the alignment is determined, axonemal microtubules extend from the basal body and forming the cilia.

Proteins must be synthesized in the cytoplasm of the cell and cannot be synthesized within cilia. For the cilium to elongate, proteins must be selectively imported from the cytoplasm into the cilium and transported to the tip of the cilium by intraflagellar transport (IFT). Once the cilium is completely formed, it continues to incorporate new tubulin at the tip of the cilia while older tubulin is simultaneously degraded. This requires an active mechanism that maintains ciliary length. Impairments in these mechanisms can affect the motility of the cell and cell signaling between cells.

There are two noted types of ciliogenesis: compartmentalized and cytosolic. Most cells undergo compartmentalized ciliogenesis in which cilia are enveloped by extensions of the plasma membrane for the entirety of development. In cytosolic ciliogenesis, the axenome must interact with proteins in the cytoplasm therefore it is directly exposed to the cytoplasm. In some cells, cytosolic ciliogenesis occurs after compartmentalized ciliogenesis.

== Disassembly ==
Cilia disassembly is much less understood than cilia assembly. From recent discoveries, three distinct types of cilia disassembly have been identified. One variety of cilia disassembly occurs when the length of the cilia is gradually reduced until it is no longer functional. Another category of cilia disassembly is shedding where cilia are severed from the main cell body. An example of this is Chlamydomonas in which a severing enzyme known as katanin separates basal bodies from axenomes.

In some organisms, a third method of cilia disassembly has been seen in which the entire axenome is internalized and then later disintegrated.

Cilia presence is seen to be inversely related to the progression of the cell cycle which can be seen by assembly occurring during cellular quiescence and disassembly occurring when the cell cycle is stimulated.

== Regulation ==
Different cells use their cilia for different purposes, such as sensory signaling or the movement of fluid. For this reason, when cilia form and how long they are can differ from cell to cell. The processes controlling ciliary formation, degradation, and length must be regulated to ensure that each cell is able to perform its necessary tasks.

Each type of cell has an optimal length for its cilia which must be regulated to ensure optimal function of the cell. Some of the same processes that are used to control the formation and removal of cilia (such as IFT) are thought to be used in the regulation of cilia length. Cilia length also differs depending on where a cell is in the cell cycle.

Three categories of molecular events that potentially regulate cilia disassembly include activation of AurA kinase and deacetylation of microtubules, depolymerization of microtubules, and ciliary membrane remodeling.

Cilia regulation is grossly understudied; however, dysregulation of ciliogenesis is linked to several diseases.

== Ciliopathies ==
Ciliary defects can lead to a broad range of human diseases known as ciliopathies that are caused by mutations in ciliary proteins. Because of how widespread cilia are, defects can cause ciliopathies in many different regions of the body.

Cilia also play a role in cell signaling and the cell cycle therefore defects to them can have a serious impact on the cell’s ability to function.

Some common ciliopathies include primary ciliary dyskinesia, hydrocephalus, polycystic liver and kidney disease, some forms of retinal degeneration, nephronophthisis, Bardet–Biedl syndrome, Alström syndrome, and Meckel–Gruber syndrome.
