= CEP170 =

Protein found in humans

Identifiers
- Aliases: CEP170, FAM68A, KAB, KIAA0470, centrosomal protein 170
- External IDs: OMIM: 613023; MGI: 1918348; GeneCards: CEP170
Available structures
PDB	Ortholog search: PDBe RCSB
PDB	List of PDB id codes 4JON

Gene location (Human)
Chr.	Chromosome 1 (human)
Band	1q43	Start	243,124,428 bp
Band	1q43	End	243,255,348 bp

Gene location (Mouse)
Chr.	Chromosome 1 (mouse)
Band	1|1 H4	Start	176,561,219 bp
Band	1|1 H4	End	176,641,633 bp
RNA expression pattern
Bgee	Human / Mouse (ortholog); Top expressed in: ganglionic eminence; corpus callosum; ventricular zone; left testis; right testis; sural nerve; C1 segment; epithelium of colon; Achilles tendon; cerebellar cortex / Top expressed in: ganglionic eminence; hand; cumulus cell; spermatid; ventricular zone; neural tube; olfactory bulb; lobe of cerebellum; tail of embryo; genital tubercle; More reference expression data
BioGPS	n/a
Orthologs
Databases	NCBI: entry; OMA: entry
Species	Human	Mouse
Entrez	9859	545389
Ensembl	ENSG00000143702; ENSG00000276725	ENSMUSG00000057335
UniProt	Q5SW79	Q6A065
RefSeq (mRNA)	NM_001042404; NM_001042405; NM_014812	NM_001024722; NM_001099637; NM_001368872; NM_001368873
RefSeq (protein)	NP_001035863; NP_001035864; NP_055627	NP_001093107; NP_001355801; NP_001355802
Location (UCSC)	Chr 1: 243.12 – 243.26 Mb	Chr 1: 176.56 – 176.64 Mb
PubMed search
- Wikidata
View/Edit Human	View/Edit Mouse

Centrosomal protein 170kDa, also known as CEP170, is a protein that in humans is encoded by the CEP170 gene.

== Function ==
The product of this gene is a component of the centrosome, a non-membraneous organelle that functions as the major microtubule organizing center in animal cells. During interphase, the encoded protein localizes to the sub-distal appendages of mature centrioles, which are microtubule-based structures thought to help organize centrosomes. During mitosis, the protein associates with spindle microtubules near the centrosomes. The protein interacts with the intraflagellar transport protein 81 (IFT81), the SH3-domain containing protein PRAX-1, and is phosphorylated by cyclin dependent kinase 1 (Cdk1) and polo-like kinase 1 (PLK1), and functions in maintaining microtubule organization, cell morphology and cilium stability.

The human genome contains a putative transcribed pseudogene. Several alternatively spliced transcript variants of this gene have been found, but the full-length nature of some of these variants has not been determined.
