= GRWD1 =

Protein-coding gene in the species Homo sapiens

Identifiers
- Aliases: GRWD1, CDW4, GRWD, RRB1, WDR28, glutamate-rich WD repeat containing 1, glutamate rich WD repeat containing 1
- External IDs: OMIM: 610597; MGI: 2141989; GeneCards: GRWD1

Gene location (Human)
Chr.	Chromosome 19 (human)
Band	19q13.33	Start	48,445,841 bp
Band	19q13.33	End	48,457,022 bp

Gene location (Mouse)
Chr.	Chromosome 7 (mouse)
Band	7|7 B3	Start	45,474,647 bp
Band	7|7 B3	End	45,480,368 bp
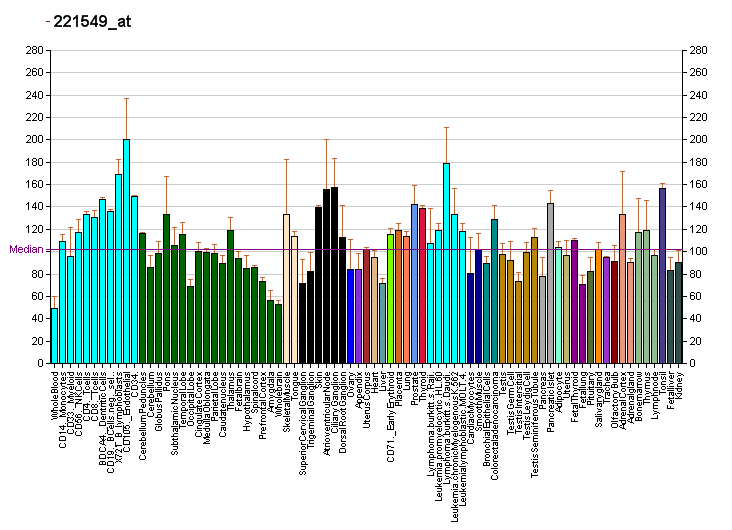
RNA expression pattern
Bgee	Human / Mouse (ortholog); Top expressed in: gastrocnemius muscle; stromal cell of endometrium; olfactory bulb; gonad; muscle of thigh; mucosa of esophagus; left uterine tube; skin of leg; apex of heart; granulocyte / Top expressed in: internal carotid artery; external carotid artery; yolk sac; epiblast; condyle; primitive streak; fossa; somite; endothelial cell of lymphatic vessel; embryo; More reference expression data
BioGPS	More reference expression data
Gene ontology
Molecular function	chromatin binding; DNA replication origin binding; RNA binding; protein binding; histone binding
Cellular component	nucleus; nucleolus; cytosol; chromosome; protein-containing complex
Biological process	nucleosome assembly; nucleosome disassembly; DNA replication
Sources:Amigo / QuickGO
Orthologs
Databases	NCBI: entry; OMA: entry
Species	Human	Mouse
Entrez	83743	101612
Ensembl	ENSG00000105447	ENSMUSG00000053801
UniProt	Q9BQ67	Q810D6
RefSeq (mRNA)	NM_031485	NM_153419
RefSeq (protein)	NP_113673	NP_700468
Location (UCSC)	Chr 19: 48.45 – 48.46 Mb	Chr 7: 45.47 – 45.48 Mb
PubMed search
- Wikidata
View/Edit Human	View/Edit Mouse

Glutamate-rich WD repeat-containing protein 1 is a WD40 repeat protein (containing five WD40 repeat motifs) that in humans is encoded by the GRWD1 gene. It localizes to the nucleus and has known functions in regulating chromatin accessibility and loading of the MCM helicase. GRWD1 has also been shown to play a critical role in ribosome biogenesis.

== Role in cancer ==
While some ribosomal proteins like RPL5 and RPL11 are suggested to act as tumor suppressors by inhibiting E3 ubiquitin-protein ligase MDM2 and thus activating p53, others, such as GRWD1, may promote tumorigenesis. Overexpression of GRWD1 suppresses p53 and transforms normal cells, possibly through its interaction with RPL11, preventing it from regulating MDM2.

In addition to its interaction with RPL11, GRWD1 directly interacts with wild-type p53, suppressing its transcriptional activity. Furthermore, overexpression of GRWD1 has been linked to the activation of oncogenic signaling pathways, such as the Notch signaling pathway, through the upregulation of ADAM17.
