= Intraflagellar transport protein 46 homolog =

Protein-coding gene in the species Homo sapiens

IFT46

Identifiers
- Aliases: IFT46, C11orf2, C11orf60, CFAP32, intraflagellar transport 46
- External IDs: MGI: 1923818; GeneCards: IFT46

Gene location (Human)
Chr.	Chromosome 11 (human)
Band	11q23.3	Start	118,544,528 bp
Band	11q23.3	End	118,572,970 bp

Gene location (Mouse)
Chr.	Chromosome 9 (mouse)
Band	9|9 A5.2	Start	44,679,205 bp
Band	9|9 A5.2	End	44,704,744 bp
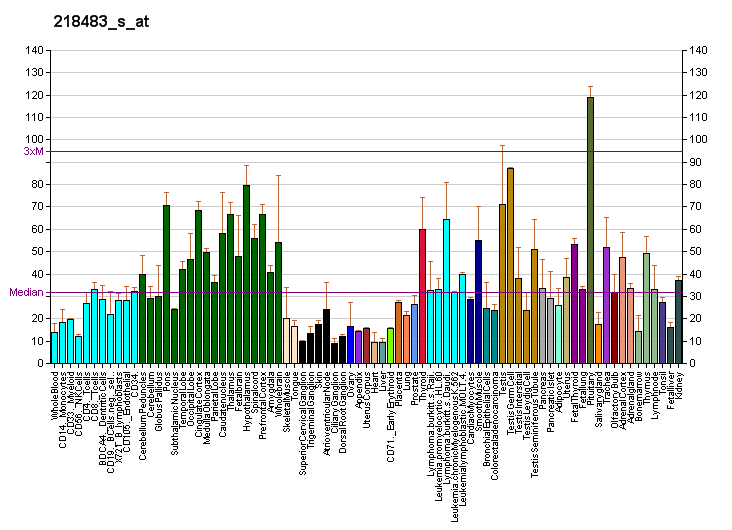
RNA expression pattern
Bgee	Human / Mouse (ortholog); Top expressed in: right uterine tube; bronchial epithelial cell; olfactory zone of nasal mucosa; Achilles tendon; anterior pituitary; islet of Langerhans; cerebellar hemisphere; right hemisphere of cerebellum; mucosa of paranasal sinus; nucleus accumbens / Top expressed in: spermatocyte; genital tubercle; ventricular zone; spermatid; saccule; dentate gyrus of hippocampal formation granule cell; medial ganglionic eminence; superior frontal gyrus; otic placode; primary visual cortex; More reference expression data
BioGPS	More reference expression data
Gene ontology
Molecular function	protein C-terminus binding; molecular function; protein binding
Cellular component	cytoplasm; intraciliary transport particle B; ciliary basal body; centrosome; cell projection; ciliary tip; cytoskeleton; cilium; motile cilium
Biological process	smoothened signaling pathway; protein stabilization; intraciliary transport; intraciliary transport involved in cilium assembly; cilium assembly; biological process
Sources:Amigo / QuickGO
Orthologs
Databases	NCBI: entry; OMA: entry
Species	Human	Mouse
Entrez	56912	76568
Ensembl	ENSG00000118096	ENSMUSG00000002031
UniProt	Q9NQC8	Q9DB07
RefSeq (mRNA)	NM_001168618; NM_020153	NM_023831
RefSeq (protein)	NP_001162089; NP_064538	NP_076320
Location (UCSC)	Chr 11: 118.54 – 118.57 Mb	Chr 9: 44.68 – 44.7 Mb
PubMed search
- Wikidata
View/Edit Human	View/Edit Mouse

Intraflagellar transport protein 46 homolog is a protein that in humans is encoded by the IFT46 gene.
