= IFT20 =

Protein-coding gene in the species Homo sapiens

Identifiers
- Aliases: IFT20, intraflagellar transport 20
- External IDs: OMIM: 614394; MGI: 1915585; GeneCards: IFT20

Gene location (Human)
Chr.	Chromosome 17 (human)
Band	17q11.2	Start	28,328,325 bp
Band	17q11.2	End	28,335,489 bp

Gene location (Mouse)
Chr.	Chromosome 11 (mouse)
Band	11|11 B5	Start	78,427,187 bp
Band	11|11 B5	End	78,432,563 bp
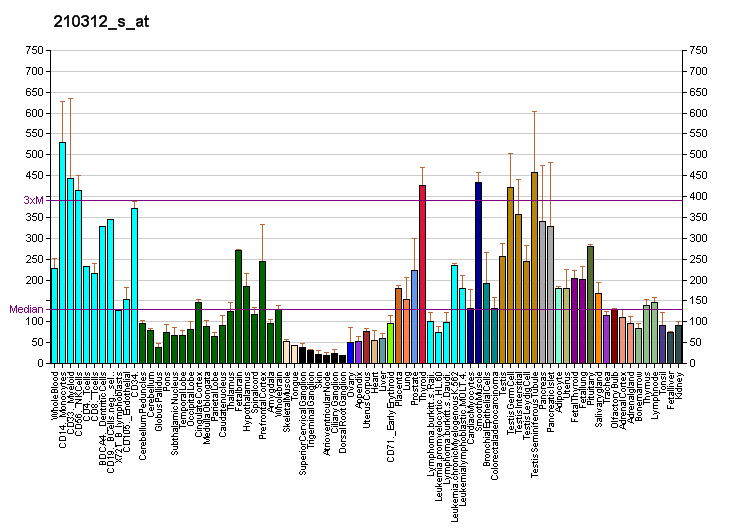
RNA expression pattern
Bgee	Human / Mouse (ortholog); Top expressed in: body of pancreas; tibia; parotid gland; pituitary gland; cerebellar hemisphere; right hemisphere of cerebellum; anterior pituitary; bronchial epithelial cell; jejunal mucosa; periodontal fiber / Top expressed in: lacrimal gland; lip; neural layer of retina; spermatocyte; blastocyst; yolk sac; zygote; right kidney; superior frontal gyrus; Ileal epithelium; More reference expression data
BioGPS	More reference expression data
Gene ontology
Molecular function	protein binding; opsin binding
Cellular component	cis-Golgi network; Golgi membrane; centriole; dendrite terminus; ciliary base; ciliary basal body; motile cilium; cytoplasm; photoreceptor connecting cilium; cytoskeleton; cell projection; ciliary tip; photoreceptor outer segment; centrosome; stereocilium; microvillus; intraciliary transport particle B; Golgi apparatus; kinociliary basal body; cilium
Biological process	smoothened signaling pathway; cell projection organization; neurogenesis; neural precursor cell proliferation; photoreceptor cell outer segment organization; cardiac muscle cell differentiation; kidney development; protein localization to Golgi apparatus; opsin transport; regulation of canonical Wnt signaling pathway; visual learning; regulation of autophagosome assembly; regulation of cilium assembly; establishment of planar polarity; inner ear receptor cell stereocilium organization; protein localization to cilium; centrosome localization; cochlea development; intraciliary transport; intraciliary transport involved in cilium assembly; cilium assembly; protein localization to plasma membrane; spermatogenesis; regulation of platelet-derived growth factor receptor-alpha signaling pathway; cell differentiation
Sources:Amigo / QuickGO
Orthologs
Databases	NCBI: entry; OMA: entry
Species	Human	Mouse
Entrez	90410	55978
Ensembl	ENSG00000109083	ENSMUSG00000001105
UniProt	Q8IY31	Q61025
RefSeq (mRNA)	NM_174887; NM_001267774; NM_001267775; NM_001267776; NM_001267777 NM_001267778	NM_018854
RefSeq (protein)	NP_001254703; NP_001254704; NP_001254705; NP_001254706; NP_001254707 NP_777547	NP_061342
Location (UCSC)	Chr 17: 28.33 – 28.34 Mb	Chr 11: 78.43 – 78.43 Mb
PubMed search
- Wikidata
View/Edit Human	View/Edit Mouse

Intraflagellar transport protein 20 homolog is a protein that in humans is encoded by the IFT20 gene. The gene is composed of 6 exons and is located on human chromosome 17p11.1. This gene is expressed in human brain, lung, kidney and pancreas, and lower expression were also detected in human placenta, liver, thymus, prostate and testis.

Intraflagellar transport (IFT), in which molecular motors and IFT particle proteins participate, is very important in assembling and maintaining many cilia/flagella, such as the motile cilia that drive the swimming of cells and embryos, the nodal cilia that generate left-right asymmetry in vertebrate embryos, and the sensory cilia that detect sensory stimuli in some animals. IFT20 subunit of the particle is localized to the Golgi complex in addition to the basal body and cilia where all previous IFT particle proteins had been found. In living cells, fluorescently tagged IFT20 is highly dynamic and moves between the Golgi complex and the cilium as well as along ciliary microtubules. IFT20 has been shown to interact with SPEF2 in the testis, and plays a role in sperm motility.
