= IFT74 =

Protein-coding gene in the species Homo sapiens

Identifiers
- Aliases: IFT74, CCDC2, CMG-1, CMG1, intraflagellar transport 74, BBS20, BBS22, SPGF58, JBTS40
- External IDs: OMIM: 608040; MGI: 1914944; GeneCards: IFT74

Gene location (Human)
Chr.	Chromosome 9 (human)
Band	9p21.2	Start	26,947,039 bp
Band	9p21.2	End	27,066,134 bp

Gene location (Mouse)
Chr.	Chromosome 4 (mouse)
Band	4|4 C5	Start	94,614,491 bp
Band	4|4 C5	End	94,693,229 bp
RNA expression pattern
Bgee	Human / Mouse (ortholog); Top expressed in: bronchial epithelial cell; caput epididymis; right uterine tube; Achilles tendon; corpus epididymis; left testis; right testis; testicle; gonad; mucosa of paranasal sinus / Top expressed in: seminiferous tubule; olfactory epithelium; spermatid; spermatocyte; maxillary prominence; mandibular prominence; saccule; Gonadal ridge; otic vesicle; Epithelium of choroid plexus; More reference expression data
BioGPS	n/a
Gene ontology
Molecular function	chromatin binding; beta-tubulin binding; protein binding
Cellular component	intraciliary transport particle B; centrosome; cell projection; ciliary tip; motile cilium; cytoplasmic vesicle; nucleus; cilium
Biological process	Notch signaling pathway; intraciliary transport; development of the heart; keratinocyte development; determination of left/right symmetry; cell projection organization; epidermis development; negative regulation of epithelial cell proliferation; positive regulation of cell adhesion mediated by integrin; positive regulation of transcription by RNA polymerase II; intraciliary transport involved in cilium assembly; cilium assembly; non-motile cilium assembly
Sources:Amigo / QuickGO
Orthologs
Databases	NCBI: entry; OMA: entry
Species	Human	Mouse
Entrez	80173	67694
Ensembl	ENSG00000096872	ENSMUSG00000028576
UniProt	Q96LB3	Q8BKE9
RefSeq (mRNA)	NM_001099222; NM_001099223; NM_001099224; NM_025103; NM_001349928	NM_001290568; NM_026319
RefSeq (protein)	NP_001092692; NP_001092693; NP_001092694; NP_079379; NP_001336857	NP_001277497; NP_080595
Location (UCSC)	Chr 9: 26.95 – 27.07 Mb	Chr 4: 94.61 – 94.69 Mb
PubMed search
- Wikidata
View/Edit Human	View/Edit Mouse

Intraflagellar transport protein 74 homolog (IFT74), also known as coiled-coil domain-containing protein 2 (CCDC2) and capillary morphogenesis gene 1 protein (CMG1), is a protein that in humans is encoded by the IFT74 gene.

BCMG1 is upregulated by umbilical vein endothelial cells during capillary morphogenesis.
