= Cilium =

Organelle found on eukaryotic cells

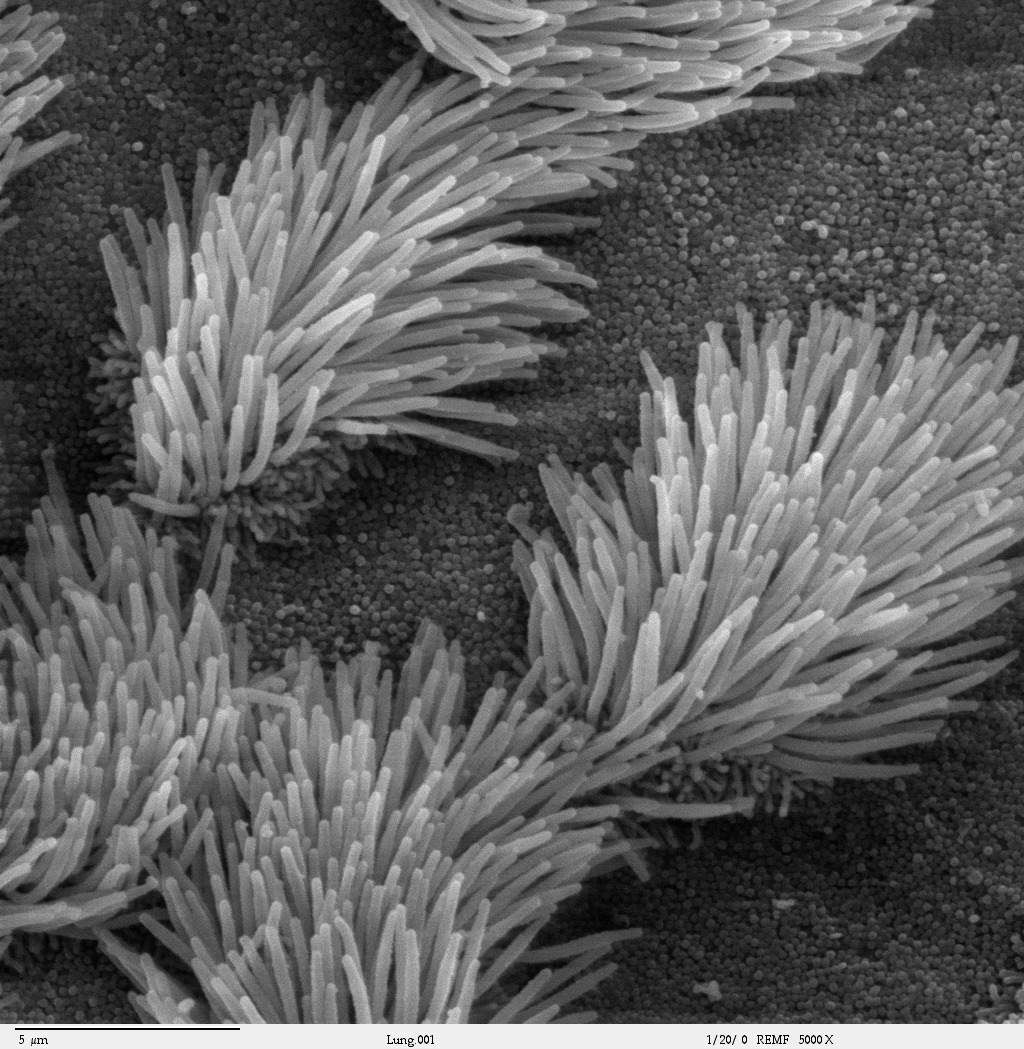
- SEM micrograph of motile cilia projecting from respiratory epithelium in the trachea

Details

Identifiers
- Latin: cilium
- MeSH: D002923
- TH: H1.00.01.1.01014
- FMA: 67181

The cilium (pl.: cilia; from Latin cilium 'eyelash'; in Medieval Latin and in anatomy, cilium) is a short hair-like membrane protrusion from many types of eukaryotic cell. (Cilia are absent in bacteria and archaea.) The cilium has the shape of a slender threadlike projection that extends from the surface of the much larger cell body. Eukaryotic flagella found on sperm cells and many protozoans have a similar structure to motile cilia that enables swimming through liquids, but they are longer than cilia and have a different undulating motion.

There are two major classes of cilia: motile and non-motile cilia, each with two subtypes, giving four types in all. A cell will typically have one primary cilium or many motile cilia. The structure of the cilium core, called the axoneme, determines the cilium class. Most motile cilia have a central pair of single microtubules surrounded by nine pairs of double microtubules called a 9+2 axoneme. Most non-motile cilia have a 9+0 axoneme that lacks the central pair of microtubules. Also lacking are the associated components that enable motility including the outer and inner dynein arms, and radial spokes. Some motile cilia lack the central pair, and some non-motile cilia have the central pair, hence the four types.

Most non-motile cilia, termed primary cilia or sensory cilia, serve solely as sensory organelles. Most vertebrate cell types possess a single non-motile primary cilium, which functions as a cellular antenna. Olfactory neurons possess a great many non-motile cilia. Non-motile cilia that have a central pair of microtubules are the kinocilia present on hair cells.

Motile cilia are found in large numbers on respiratory epithelial cells – around 200 cilia per cell, where they function in mucociliary clearance, and also have mechanosensory and chemosensory functions. Motile cilia on ependymal cells move the cerebrospinal fluid through the ventricular system of the brain. Motile cilia are also present in the oviducts (fallopian tubes) of female (therian) mammals, where they function in moving egg cells from the ovary to the uterus. Motile cilia that lack the central pair of microtubules are found in the cells of the embryonic primitive node; termed nodal cells, these nodal cilia are responsible for the left-right asymmetry of bilaterians.

== Structure ==
Cilia are hair-like protrusions from the plasma membrane of most eukaryotic cells that are involved in movement or gathering sensory information.

Eukaryotic motile cilium

Cilia can be between one and five micrometers in length. A cilium is assembled and built from a basal body on the cell surface. From the basal body, the ciliary rootlet forms ahead of the transition plate and transition zone where the earlier microtubule triplets change to the microtubule doublets of the axoneme.

=== Basal body ===
The foundation of the cilium is the basal body, a modified mother centriole on the cell surface. Mammalian basal bodies consist of a barrel of nine triplet microtubules, subdistal appendages and nine strut-like structures, known as distal appendages, which attach the basal body to the membrane at the base of the cilium. Two of each of the basal body's triplet microtubules extend during growth of the axoneme to become the doublet microtubules.

=== Ciliary rootlet ===
The ciliary rootlet is a cytoskeleton-like structure that originates from the basal body at the proximal end of a cilium. Rootlets are typically 80-100 nm in diameter and contain cross striae distributed at regular intervals of approximately 55-70 nm. A prominent component of the rootlet is rootletin a coiled coil rootlet protein coded for by the CROCC gene.

=== Transition zone ===
To achieve its distinct composition, the proximal-most region of the cilium consists of a transition zone, also known as the ciliary gate, that controls the entry and exit of proteins to and from the cilium. At the transition zone, Y-shaped structures connect the ciliary membrane to the underlying axoneme. Control of selective entry into cilia may involve a sieve-like function of transition zone. Inherited defects in components of the transition zone cause ciliopathies, such as Joubert syndrome. Transition zone structure and function is conserved across diverse organisms, including vertebrates, Caenorhabditis elegans, Drosophila melanogaster and Chlamydomonas reinhardtii. In mammals, disruption of the transition zone reduces the ciliary abundance of membrane-associated ciliary proteins, such as those involved in Hedgehog signal transduction, compromising Hedgehog-dependent embryonic development of digit number and central nervous system patterning.

=== Axoneme ===
Inside a cilium is a microtubule-based cytoskeletal core called the axoneme. The axoneme of a primary cilium typically has a ring of nine outer microtubule doublets (called a 9+0 axoneme), and the axoneme of a motile cilium has, in addition to the nine outer doublets, two central microtubule singlets (called a 9+2 axoneme). This is the same axoneme type of the flagellum. The axoneme in a motile cilium acts as a scaffold for the inner and outer dynein arms that move the cilium, and provides tracks for the microtubule motor proteins of kinesin and dynein. The transport of ciliary components is carried out by intraflagellar transport (IFT) which is similar to the axonal transport in a nerve fibre. Transport is bidirectional and cytoskeletal motor proteins kinesin and dynein transport ciliary components along the microtubule tracks; kinesin in an anterograde movement towards the ciliary tip and dynein in a retrograde movement towards the cell body. The cilium has its own ciliary membrane enclosed within the surrounding cell membrane.

== Types ==
=== Non-motile cilia ===
In animals, non-motile primary cilia are found on nearly every type of cell, blood cells being a prominent exception. Most cells only possess one, in contrast to cells with motile cilia, an exception being olfactory sensory neurons, where the odorant receptors are located, which each possess about ten cilia. Some cell types, such as retinal photoreceptor cells, possess highly specialized primary cilia.

Although the primary cilium was discovered in 1898, it was largely ignored for a century and considered a vestigial organelle without important function. Recent findings regarding its physiological roles in chemosensation, signal transduction, and cell growth control, have revealed its importance in cell function. Its importance to human biology has been underscored by the discovery of its role in a diverse group of diseases caused by the dysgenesis or dysfunction of cilia, such as polycystic kidney disease, congenital heart disease, mitral valve prolapse, and retinal degeneration, called ciliopathies. The primary cilium is now known to play an important role in the function of many human organs. Primary cilia on pancreatic beta cells regulate their function and energy metabolism. Cilia deletion can lead to islet dysfunction and type 2 diabetes.

Cilia are assembled during the G_{1} phase and are disassembled before mitosis occurs. Disassembly of cilia requires the action of aurora kinase A. The current scientific understanding of primary cilia views them as "sensory cellular antennae that coordinate many cellular signaling pathways, sometimes coupling the signaling to ciliary motility or alternatively to cell division and differentiation." The cilium is composed of subdomains and enclosed by a plasma membrane continuous with the plasma membrane of the cell. For many cilia, the basal body, where the cilium originates, is located within a membrane invagination called the ciliary pocket. The cilium membrane and the basal body microtubules are connected by distal appendages (also called transition fibers). Vesicles carrying molecules for the cilia dock at the distal appendages. Distal to the transition fibers form a transition zone where entry and exit of molecules is regulated to and from the cilia. Some of the signaling with these cilia occur through ligand binding such as Hedgehog signaling. Other forms of signaling include G protein-coupled receptors including the somatostatin receptor 3 in neurons.

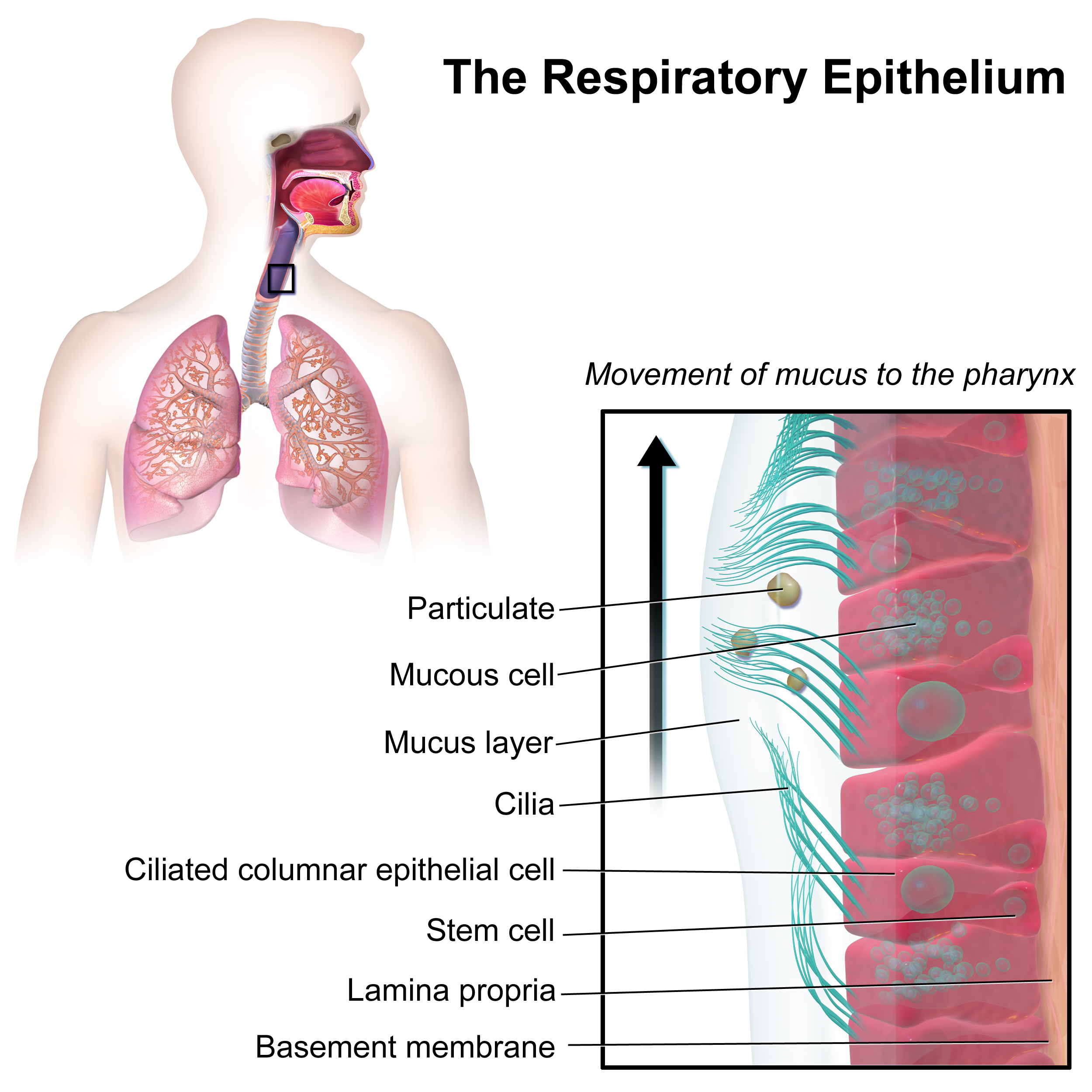
Illustration depicting motile cilia on respiratory epithelium

==== Modified non-motile cilia ====
In the inner ear, kinocilia that are termed as specialized primary cilia, or modified non-motile cilia are found on the hair cells. They possess the 9+2 axoneme of the motile cilia, but lack the inner dynein arms that give movement. They do move passively following the detection of sound, allowed by the outer dynein arms.

=== Motile cilia ===
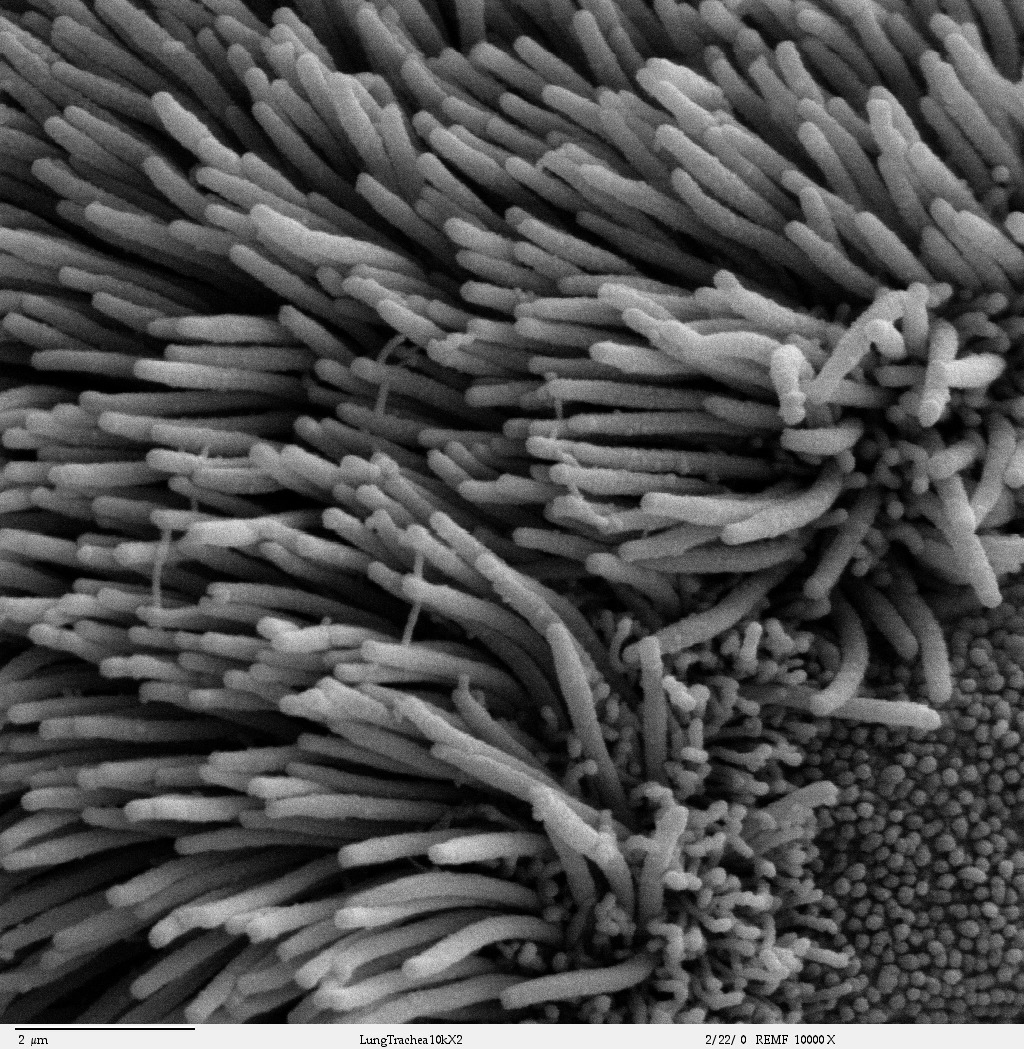
Tracheal respiratory epithelium showing cilia and much smaller microvilli on non-ciliated cells in scanning electron micrograph

Mammals also have motile cilia or secondary cilia that are usually present on a cell's surface in large numbers (multiciliate), and beat in coordinated metachronal waves. Multiciliated cells are found lining the respiratory tract where they function in mucociliary clearance sweeping mucus containing debris away from the lungs. Each cell in the respiratory epithelium has around 200 motile cilia.

In the reproductive tract, smooth muscle contractions help the beating of the cilia in moving the egg cell from the ovary to the uterus.

In the ventricles of the brain ciliated ependymal cells circulate the cerebrospinal fluid.

The functioning of motile cilia is strongly dependent on the maintenance of optimal levels of periciliary fluid bathing the cilia. Epithelial sodium channels (ENaCs) are specifically expressed along the entire length of cilia in the respiratory tract, and fallopian tube or oviduct that apparently serve as sensors to regulate the periciliary fluid.

==== Modified motile cilia ====
Motile cilia without the central pair of singlets (9+0) are found in early embryonic development. They are present as nodal cilia on the nodal cells of the primitive node. Nodal cells are responsible for the left-right asymmetry in bilateral animals. While lacking the central apparatus there are dynein arms present that allow the nodal cilia to move in a spinning fashion. The movement creates a current flow of the extraembryonic fluid across the nodal surface in a leftward direction that initiates the left-right asymmetry in the developing embryo.

Motile, multiple, 9+0 cilia are found on the epithelial cells of the choroid plexus. Cilia also can change structure when introduced to hot temperatures and become sharp. They are present in large numbers on each cell and move relatively slowly, making them intermediate between motile and primary cilia. In addition to 9+0 cilia that are mobile, there are also solitary 9+2 cilia that stay immobile found in hair cells.

==== Nodal cilia ====
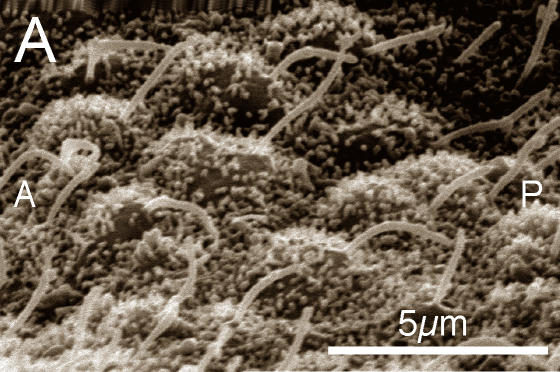
Scanning electron micrograph of nodal cilia on a mouse embryo

Nodal cells have a single cilium called a monocilium. They are present in the very early development of the embryo on the primitive node. There are two areas of the node with different types of nodal cilia. On the central node are motile cilia, and on the peripheral area of the node the nodal cilia are modified motile.

The motile cilia on the central cells rotate to generate the leftward flow of extracellular fluid needed to initiate the left-right asymmetry.

=== Cilia versus flagella ===
The motile cilia on sperm cells and many protozoans enables swimming through liquids and are traditionally referred to as "flagella". As these protrusions are structurally identical to motile cilia, attempts at preserving this terminology include making a distinction by morphology ("flagella" are typically longer than ordinary cilia and have a different undulating motion) and by number.

=== Microorganisms ===
Ciliates are eukaryotic microorganisms that possess motile cilia exclusively and use them for either locomotion or to simply move liquid over their surface. A Paramecium for example is covered in thousands of cilia that enable its swimming. These motile cilia have been shown to be sensory as well.

== Ciliogenesis ==
Cilia are formed through the process of ciliogenesis. An early step is docking of the basal body to the growing ciliary membrane, after which the transition zone forms. The building blocks of the ciliary axoneme, such as tubulins, are added at the ciliary tips through a process that depends partly on intraflagellar transport (IFT). Exceptions include Drosophila sperm and Plasmodium falciparum flagella formation, in which cilia assemble in the cytoplasm.

At the base of the cilium where it attaches to the cell body is the microtubule organizing center, the basal body. Some basal body proteins such as CEP164, ODF2, and CEP170, are required for the formation and the stability of the cilium.

In effect, the cilium is a nanomachine composed of perhaps more than 600 proteins in molecular complexes, many of which also function independently as nanomachines. Flexible linkers allow the mobile protein domains connected by them to recruit their binding partners and induce long-range allostery via protein domain dynamics.

== Function ==
The dynein in the axoneme – axonemal dynein forms bridges between neighbouring microtubule doublets. When ATP activates the motor domain of dynein, it attempts to walk along the adjoining microtubule doublet. This would force the adjacent doublets to slide over one another if not for the presence of nexin between the microtubule doublets. And thus the force generated by dynein is instead converted into a bending motion.

=== Sensing the extracellular environment ===
Some primary cilia on epithelial cells in eukaryotes act as cellular antennae, providing chemosensation, thermosensation and mechanosensation of the extracellular environment. These cilia then play a role in mediating specific signalling cues, including soluble factors in the external cell environment, a secretory role in which a soluble protein is released to have an effect downstream of the fluid flow, and mediation of fluid flow if the cilia are motile.

Some epithelial cells are ciliated, and they commonly exist as a sheet of polarized cells forming a tube or tubule with cilia projecting into the lumen. This sensory and signalling role puts cilia in a central role for maintaining the local cellular environment and may be why ciliary defects cause such a wide range of human diseases.

In the embryo, nodal cilia are used to direct the flow of extracellular fluid. This leftward movement is to generate left-right asymmetry across the midline of the embryo. Central cilia coordinate their rotational beating while the immotile cilia on the sides sense the direction of the flow. Studies in mice suggest a biophysical mechanism by which the direction of flow is sensed.

=== Axo-ciliary synapse ===
With axo-ciliary synapses, there is communication between serotonergic axons and primary cilia of CA1 pyramidal neurons that alters the neuron's epigenetic state in the nucleus – "a way to change what is being transcribed or made in the nucleus" via this signalling distinct from that at the plasma membrane which also is longer-term.

== Clinical significance ==
Ciliary defects can lead to a number of human diseases. Defects in cilia adversely affect many critical signaling pathways essential to embryonic development and to adult physiology, and thus offer a plausible hypothesis for the often multi-symptom nature of diverse ciliopathies. Known ciliopathies include primary ciliary dyskinesia, Bardet–Biedl syndrome, polycystic kidney and liver disease, nephronophthisis, Alström syndrome, Meckel–Gruber syndrome, Sensenbrenner syndrome and some forms of retinal degeneration. Genetic mutations compromising the proper functioning of cilia, ciliopathies, may cause chronic disorders such as primary ciliary dyskinesia (PCD), nephronophthisis, and Senior–Løken syndrome. In addition, a defect of the primary cilium in the renal tubule cells may lead to polycystic kidney disease (PKD). In another genetic disorder called Bardet–Biedl syndrome (BBS), the mutant gene products are the components in the basal body and cilia.

Defects in cilia cells are linked to obesity and often pronounced in type 2 diabetes. Several studies already showed impaired glucose tolerance and reduction in the insulin secretion in the ciliopathy models. Moreover, the number and length of cilia was decreased in the type 2 diabetes models.

Epithelial sodium channels (ENaCs) that are expressed along the length of cilia regulate periciliary fluid level. Mutations that decrease the activity of ENaCs result in multisystem pseudohypoaldosteronism, that is associated with fertility problems. In cystic fibrosis that results from mutations in the chloride channel CFTR, ENaC activity is enhanced leading to a severe reduction of the fluid level that causes complications and infections in the respiratory airways.

Since the flagellum of human sperm has the same internal structure of a cilium, ciliary dysfunction may be responsible for male infertility as well.

There is an association of primary ciliary dyskinesia with left-right anatomic abnormalities such as situs inversus (a combination of findings is known as Kartagener syndrome), and situs ambiguus (also known as Heterotaxy syndrome). These left-right anatomic abnormalities can also result in congenital heart disease.

It has been shown that proper cilial function is responsible for the normal left-right asymmetry in mammals.

The diverse outcomes caused by ciliary dysfunction may result from alleles of different strengths that compromise ciliary functions in different ways or to different extents. Many ciliopathies are inherited in a Mendelian manner, but specific genetic interactions between distinct functional ciliary complexes, such as transition zone and BBS complexes, can alter the phenotypic manifestations of recessive ciliopathies. Some mutations in transition zone proteins can cause specific serious ciliopathies.

=== Extracellular changes ===
Reduction of cilia function can also result from infection. Research into biofilms has shown that bacteria can alter cilia. A biofilm is a community of bacteria of either the same or multiple species of bacteria. The cluster of cells secretes different factors which form an extracellular matrix. Cilia in the respiratory system is known to move mucus and pathogens out of the airways. It has been found that patients with biofilm positive infections have impaired cilia function. The impairment may present as decreased motion or reduction in the number of cilia. Though these changes result from an external source, they still effect the pathogenicity of the bacteria, progression of infection, and how it is treated.

The transportation of the immature egg cell, and the embryo to the uterus for implantation depends on the combination of regulated smooth muscle contractions, and ciliary beating. Dysfunction in this transportation can result in an ectopic pregnancy where the embryo is implanted (usually) in the fallopian tube before reaching its proper destination of the uterus. Many factors can affect this stage including infection and menstrual cycle hormones. Smoking (causing inflammation), and infection may reduce the numbers of cilia, and the ciliary beat may be affected by hormonal changes.

=== Primary cilia in pancreatic cells ===
The pancreas is a mixture of highly differentiated exocrine and endocrine cells. Primary cilia are present in exocrine cells, which are centroacinar duct cells. Endocrine tissue is composed of different hormone-secreting cells. Insulin-secreting beta cells and glucagon-secreting alpha cells are highly ciliated.

== See also ==
- Hydrogenobody – single-membraned oval-shaped organelle found in rumen ciliates
- Molecular machine#Biological molecular machines – Molecular-scale artificial or biological device
- Protein dynamics#Global flexibility: multiple domains – Study of how proteins move and change shape
- Protein domain#Domains and protein flexibility – Self-stable region of a protein's chain that folds independently from the rest
- Stereocilia – Cell structure
