= IFT80 =

Protein-coding gene in the species Homo sapiens

Identifiers
- Aliases: IFT80, ATD2, SRTD2, WDR56, intraflagellar transport 80, FAP167
- External IDs: OMIM: 611177; MGI: 1915509; GeneCards: IFT80

Gene location (Human)
Chr.	Chromosome 3 (human)
Band	3q25.33	Start	160,256,986 bp
Band	3q25.33	End	160,399,880 bp

Gene location (Mouse)
Chr.	Chromosome 3 (mouse)
Band	3|3 E1	Start	68,799,832 bp
Band	3|3 E1	End	68,911,903 bp
RNA expression pattern
Bgee	Human / Mouse (ortholog); Top expressed in: epithelium of colon; endothelial cell; bronchial epithelial cell; mucosa of paranasal sinus; Brodmann area 23; corpus callosum; germinal epithelium; external globus pallidus; visceral pleura; Brodmann area 46 / Top expressed in: spermatocyte; olfactory epithelium; spermatid; interventricular septum; Epithelium of choroid plexus; thymus; pituitary gland; seminiferous tubule; neural layer of retina; pineal gland; More reference expression data
BioGPS	n/a
Gene ontology
Molecular function	protein binding
Cellular component	cytoplasm; ciliary tip; cell projection; cytoskeleton; cilium; centrosome; intraciliary transport particle B
Biological process	intraciliary transport involved in cilium assembly; cilium assembly; osteoblast differentiation; chondrocyte differentiation; smoothened signaling pathway; positive regulation of smoothened signaling pathway; negative regulation of epithelial cell proliferation; bone morphogenesis; non-motile cilium assembly; negative regulation of non-canonical Wnt signaling pathway
Sources:Amigo / QuickGO
Orthologs
Databases	NCBI: entry; OMA: entry
Species	Human	Mouse
Entrez	57560	68259
Ensembl	ENSG00000068885	ENSMUSG00000027778
UniProt	Q9P2H3	Q8K057
RefSeq (mRNA)	NM_020800; NM_001190241; NM_001190242	NM_026641
RefSeq (protein)	NP_001177170; NP_001177171; NP_065851	NP_080917
Location (UCSC)	Chr 3: 160.26 – 160.4 Mb	Chr 3: 68.8 – 68.91 Mb
PubMed search
- Wikidata
View/Edit Human	View/Edit Mouse

Intraflagellar transport protein 80 homolog (IFT80), also known as WD repeat-containing protein 56, is a protein that in humans is encoded by the IFT80 gene.

== Function ==
IFT80 is part of the intraflagellar transport complex B and is necessary for the function of motile and sensory cilia.

== Clinical significance ==
Mutations in the IFT80 gene are associated with asphyxiating thoracic dysplasia.
