= PES1 =

Protein-coding gene in the species Homo sapiens

Identifiers
- Aliases: PES1, PES, pescadillo ribosomal biogenesis factor 1, NOP7
- External IDs: OMIM: 605819; MGI: 1890613; GeneCards: PES1
Available structures
PDB	Ortholog search: PDBe RCSB
PDB	List of PDB id codes 2EP8

Gene location (Human)
Chr.	Chromosome 22 (human)
Band	22q12.2	Start	30,576,625 bp
Band	22q12.2	End	30,607,083 bp

Gene location (Mouse)
Chr.	Chromosome 11 (mouse)
Band	11|11 A1	Start	3,913,975 bp
Band	11|11 A1	End	3,930,004 bp
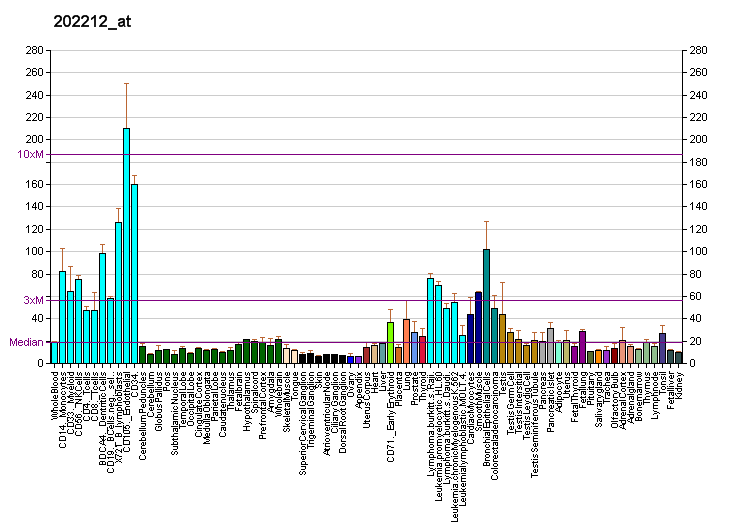
RNA expression pattern
Bgee	Human / Mouse (ortholog); Top expressed in: sural nerve; body of pancreas; islet of Langerhans; skin of leg; mucosa of transverse colon; skin of abdomen; left testis; stromal cell of endometrium; body of stomach; right testis / Top expressed in: interventricular septum; yolk sac; spermatocyte; ventricular zone; neural layer of retina; tail of embryo; spermatid; otic vesicle; embryo; epiblast; More reference expression data
BioGPS	More reference expression data
Gene ontology
Molecular function	protein binding; RNA binding; ribonucleoprotein complex binding
Cellular component	membrane; PeBoW complex; chromosome; nucleolus; condensed chromosome; nucleus; nucleoplasm; cytosol; preribosome, large subunit precursor
Biological process	protein localization to organelle; ribosome biogenesis; regulation of cell cycle; nucleolus organization; maturation of LSU-rRNA from tricistronic rRNA transcript (SSU-rRNA, 5.8S rRNA, LSU-rRNA); cell population proliferation; rRNA processing; maturation of 5.8S rRNA from tricistronic rRNA transcript (SSU-rRNA, 5.8S rRNA, LSU-rRNA); ribosomal large subunit biogenesis
Sources:Amigo / QuickGO
Orthologs
Databases	NCBI: entry; OMA: entry
Species	Human	Mouse
Entrez	23481	64934
Ensembl	ENSG00000100029	ENSMUSG00000020430
UniProt	O00541	Q9EQ61
RefSeq (mRNA)	NM_001243225; NM_001282327; NM_001282328; NM_014303	NM_022889
RefSeq (protein)	NP_001230154; NP_001269256; NP_001269257; NP_055118	NP_075027
Location (UCSC)	Chr 22: 30.58 – 30.61 Mb	Chr 11: 3.91 – 3.93 Mb
PubMed search
- Wikidata
View/Edit Human	View/Edit Mouse

Pescadillo homolog is a protein that in humans is encoded by the PES1 gene.

This gene encodes a protein that is abnormally elevated in malignant tumors of astrocytic origin. It is a strongly conserved gene containing a BRCT domain that is essential for the activity of this gene product. The gene plays a crucial role in cell proliferation and may be necessary for oncogenic transformation and tumor progression.
