= Vertical Expandable Prosthetic Titanium Rib =

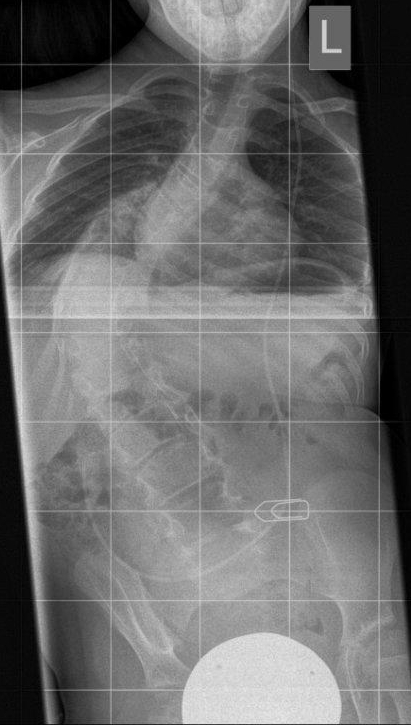
Thoracic scoliosis due to Diastematomyelia and Myelomeningocele (MMC) in a 10-year-old boy

Vertical Expandable Prosthetic Titanium Ribs (VEPTR) is a product of Synthes for the treatment of childhood deformities of the thorax. It is a special form of a lengthenable rod ("Growing Rod"). An alternative system is the USS pediatric for older children, also from Synthes.

The instrument is used to dilate a too small or too narrow rib thorax in severe thoracic deformity. It consists of a telescopic "titanium rib" in curved form with several holes in a row for fixing in the desired length. A prolongation can be carried out after 6 months. The fixation takes place between two ribs or between a rib and the iliac crest. This results in an indirect erection of the deformed spine, resulting in an increase in the volume of the thoracic cavity along with the lung.
