= Dynein =

Class of enzymes

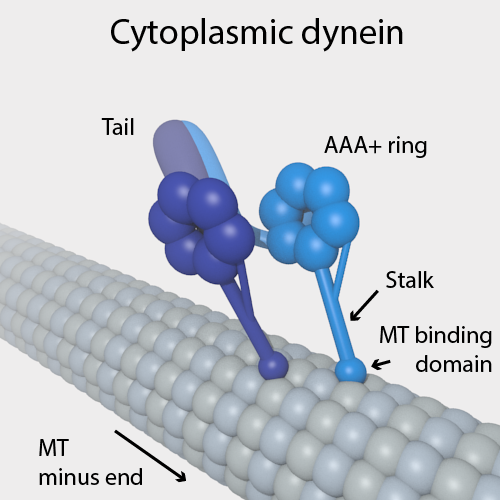
Cytoplasmic dynein on a microtubule

Dyneins are a family of cytoskeletal motor proteins (though they are actually protein complexes) that move along microtubules in cells. They convert the chemical energy stored in ATP to mechanical work. Dynein transports various cellular cargos, provides forces and displacements important in mitosis, and drives the beat of eukaryotic cilia and flagella. All of these functions rely on dynein's ability to move towards the minus-end of the microtubules, known as retrograde transport; thus, they are called "minus-end directed motors". In contrast, most kinesin motor proteins move toward the microtubules' plus-end, in what is called anterograde transport.

== Classification ==
Dynein heavy chain, N-terminal region 1

Identifiers
- Symbol: DHC_N1
- Pfam: PF08385
- InterPro: IPR013594
Available protein structures:
- PDB: IPR013594 PF08385 (ECOD; PDBsum)
- AlphaFold: IPR013594; PF08385

Dynein heavy chain, N-terminal region 2

Identifiers
- Symbol: DHC_N2
- Pfam: PF08393
- InterPro: IPR013602
Available protein structures:
- PDB: IPR013602 PF08393 (ECOD; PDBsum)
- AlphaFold: IPR013602; PF08393

Dynein heavy chain and region D6 of dynein motor

Identifiers
- Symbol: Dynein_heavy
- Pfam: PF03028
- InterPro: IPR004273
Available protein structures:
- PDB: IPR004273 PF03028 (ECOD; PDBsum)
- AlphaFold: IPR004273; PF03028

Dynein light intermediate chain (DLIC)

Identifiers
- Symbol: DLIC
- Pfam: PF05783
- Pfam clan: CL0023
Available protein structures:
- PDB: http://www.rcsb.org/pdb/explore/explore.do?structureId=4w7g PF05783 (ECOD; PDBsum)
- AlphaFold: PF05783

Dynein light chain type 1
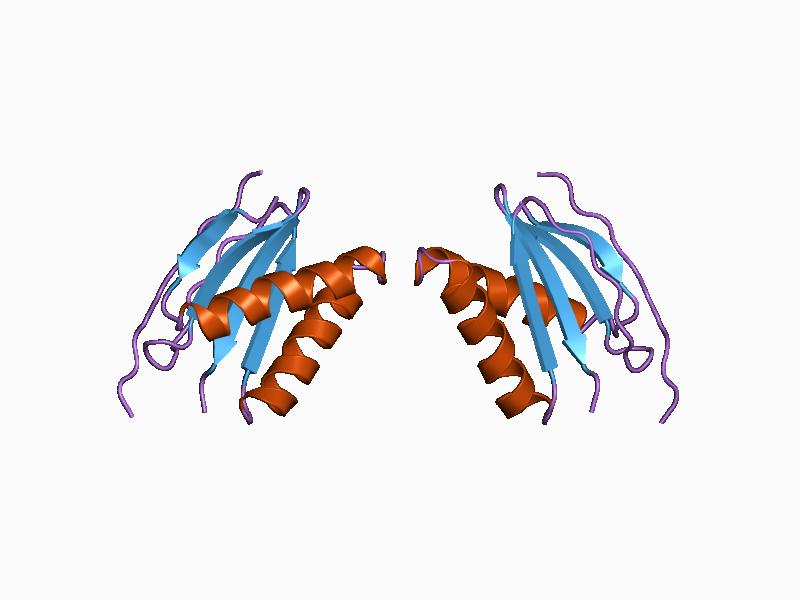
- structure of the human pin/lc8 dimer with a bound peptide

Identifiers
- Symbol: Dynein_light
- Pfam: PF01221
- InterPro: IPR001372
- PROSITE: PDOC00953
- SCOP2: 1bkq / SCOPe / SUPFAM
Available protein structures:
- PDB: IPR001372 PF01221 (ECOD; PDBsum)
- AlphaFold: IPR001372; PF01221

Roadblock
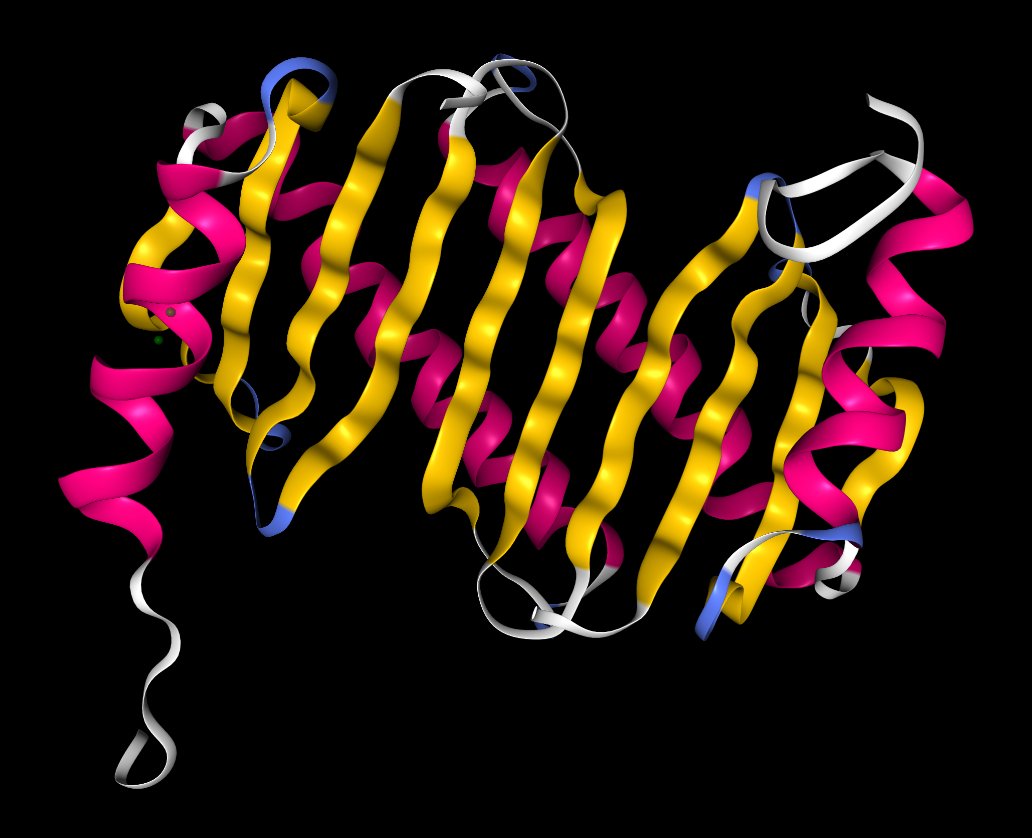
- Structure of Roadblock/LC7 protein - RCSB PDB 1y4o

Identifiers
- Symbol: Robl1, Robl2
- Pfam: PF03259
- InterPro: IPR016561
- SCOP2: 1y4o / SCOPe / SUPFAM
Available protein structures:
- PDB: IPR016561 PF03259 (ECOD; PDBsum)
- AlphaFold: IPR016561; PF03259

Dyneins can be divided into two groups: cytoplasmic dyneins and axonemal dyneins, which are also called ciliary or flagellar dyneins.

- Cytoplasmic
  - Heavy chain: DYNC1H1, DYNC2H1
  - Intermediate chain: DYNC1I1, DYNC1I2
  - Light intermediate chain: DYNC1LI1, DYNC1LI2, DYNC2LI1
  - Light chain: DYNLL1, DYNLL2, DYNLRB1, DYNLRB2, DYNLT1, DYNLT3
- Axonemal
  - Heavy chain: DNAH1, DNAH2, DNAH3, DNAH5, DNAH6, DNAH7, DNAH8, DNAH9, DNAH10, DNAH11, DNAH12, DNAH13, DNAH14, DNAH17
  - Intermediate chain: DNAI1, DNAI2
  - Light intermediate chain: DNALI1
  - Light chain: DNAL1, DNAL4

== Function ==
Axonemal dynein causes sliding of microtubules in the axonemes of cilia and flagella and is found only in cells that have those structures.

Cytoplasmic dynein, found in all animal cells and possibly plant cells as well, performs functions necessary for cell survival such as organelle transport and centrosome assembly. Cytoplasmic dynein moves processively along the microtubule; that is, one or the other of its stalks is always attached to the microtubule so that the dynein can "walk" a considerable distance along a microtubule without detaching.

Cytoplasmic dynein helps to position the Golgi complex and other organelles in the cell. It also helps transport cargo needed for cell function such as vesicles made by the endoplasmic reticulum, endosomes, and lysosomes (Karp, 2005). Dynein is involved in the movement of chromosomes and positioning the mitotic spindles for cell division. Dynein carries organelles, vesicles and possibly microtubule fragments along the axons of neurons toward the cell body in a process called retrograde axonal transport. Additionally, dynein motor is also responsible for the transport of degradative endosomes retrogradely in the dendrites.

Another form of cytoplasmic dynein, Dynein-2, contributes to the assembly of cilia and flagella by mediating retrograde intraflagellar transport.

=== Mitotic spindle positioning ===
Cytoplasmic dynein positions the spindle at the site of cytokinesis by anchoring to the cell cortex and pulling on astral microtubules emanating from centrosome. While a postdoctoral student at MIT, Tomomi Kiyomitsu discovered how dynein has a role as a motor protein in aligning the chromosomes in the middle of the cell during the metaphase of mitosis. Dynein pulls the microtubules and chromosomes to one end of the cell. When the end of the microtubules become close to the cell membrane, they release a chemical signal that punts the dynein to the other side of the cell. It does this repeatedly so the chromosomes end up in the center of the cell, which is necessary in mitosis. Budding yeast have been a powerful model organism to study this process and has shown that dynein is targeted to plus ends of astral microtubules and delivered to the cell cortex via an offloading mechanism.

=== Viral replication ===
Dynein and kinesin can both be exploited by viruses to mediate the viral replication process. Many viruses use the microtubule transport system to transport nucleic acid/protein cores to intracellular replication sites after invasion of the host cell membrane. Not much is known about virus' motor-specific binding sites, but it is known that some viruses contain proline-rich sequences (that diverge between viruses) which, when removed, reduces dynactin binding, axon transport (in culture), and neuroinvasion in vivo. This suggests that proline-rich sequences may be a major binding site that co-opts dynein.

== Structure ==
Human cytoplasmic dynein 2 domains. Shown is the order of regions of interest for human cytoplasmic dynein 2 motor domains as they occur from the linker to C-terminal. This is oriented to demonstrate the general bound position of dynein on a microtubule. The mirror effect allows the view to observe the dynein from both sides of the complex.

Each molecule of the dynein motor is a complex protein assembly composed of many smaller polypeptide subunits. Cytoplasmic and axonemal dynein contain some of the same components, but they also contain some unique subunits.

=== Cytoplasmic dynein ===
Cytoplasmic dynein, which has a molecular mass of about 1.5 megadaltons (MDa), is a dimer of dimers, containing approximately twelve polypeptide subunits: two identical "heavy chains", 520 kDa in mass, which contain the ATPase activity and are thus responsible for generating movement along the microtubule; two 74 kDa intermediate chains which are believed to anchor the dynein to its cargo; two 53–59 kDa light intermediate chains; and several light chains.

The force-generating ATPase activity of each dynein heavy chain is located in its large doughnut-shaped "head", which is related to other AAA proteins, while two projections from the head connect it to other cytoplasmic structures. One projection, the coiled-coil stalk, binds to and "walks" along the surface of the microtubule via a repeated cycle of detachment and reattachment. The other projection, the extended tail, binds to the light intermediate, intermediate and light chain subunits which attach dynein to its cargo. The alternating activity of the paired heavy chains in the complete cytoplasmic dynein motor enables a single dynein molecule to transport its cargo by "walking" a considerable distance along a microtubule without becoming completely detached.

In the apo-state of dynein, the motor is nucleotide free, the AAA domain ring exists in an open conformation, and the MTBD exists in a high affinity state. Much about the AAA domains remains unknown, but AAA1 is well established as the primary site of ATP hydrolysis in dynein. When ATP binds to AAA1, it initiates a conformational change of the AAA domain ring into the "closed" configuration, movement of the buttress, and a conformational change in the linker. The linker becomes bent and shifts from AAA5 to AAA2 while remaining bound to AAA1. One attached alpha-helix from the stalk is pulled by the buttress, sliding the helix half a heptad repeat relative to its coilled-coil partner, and kinking the stalk. As a result, the MTBD of dynein enters a low-affinity state, allowing the motor to move to new binding sites. Following hydrolysis of ATP, the stalk rotates, moving dynein further along the MT. Upon the release of the phosphate, the MTBD returns to a high affinity state and rebinds the MT, triggering the power stroke. The linker returns to a straight conformation and swings back to AAA5 from AAA2 and creates a lever-action, producing the greatest displacement of dynein achieved by the power stroke The cycle concludes with the release of ADP, which returns the AAA domain ring back to the "open" configuration.

Yeast dynein can walk along microtubules without detaching, however in metazoans, cytoplasmic dynein must be activated by the binding of dynactin, another multisubunit protein that is essential for mitosis, and a cargo adaptor. The tri-complex, which includes dynein, dynactin and a cargo adaptor, is ultra-processive and can walk long distances without detaching in order to reach the cargo's intracellular destination. Cargo adaptors identified thus far include BicD2, Hook3, FIP3 and Spindly. The light intermediate chain, which is a member of the Ras superfamily, mediates the attachment of several cargo adaptors to the dynein motor. The other tail subunits may also help facilitate this interaction as evidenced in a low resolution structure of dynein-dynactin-BicD2.

One major form of motor regulation within cells for dynein is dynactin. It may be required for almost all cytoplasmic dynein functions. Currently, it is the best studied dynein partner. Dynactin is a protein that aids in intracellular transport throughout the cell by linking to cytoplasmic dynein. Dynactin can function as a scaffold for other proteins to bind to. It also functions as a recruiting factor that localizes dynein to where it should be. There is also some evidence suggesting that it may regulate kinesin-2. The dynactin complex is composed of more than 20 subunits, of which p150(Glued) is the largest. There is no definitive evidence that dynactin by itself affects the velocity of the motor. It does, however, affect the processivity of the motor. The binding regulation is likely allosteric: experiments have shown that the enhancements provided in the processivity of the dynein motor do not depend on the p150 subunit binding domain to the microtubules.

=== Axonemal dynein ===
A cross-section of an axoneme, with axonemal dynein arms

Axonemal dyneins come in multiple forms that contain either one, two or three non-identical heavy chains (depending upon the organism and location in the cilium). Each heavy chain has a globular motor domain with a doughnut-shaped structure believed to resemble that of other AAA proteins, a coiled coil "stalk" that binds to the microtubule, and an extended tail (or "stem") that attaches to a neighboring microtubule of the same axoneme. Each dynein molecule thus forms a cross-bridge between two adjacent microtubules of the ciliary axoneme. During the "power stroke", which causes movement, the AAA ATPase motor domain undergoes a conformational change that causes the microtubule-binding stalk to pivot relative to the cargo-binding tail with the result that one microtubule slides relative to the other (Karp, 2005). This sliding produces the bending movement needed for cilia to beat and propel the cell or other particles. Groups of dynein molecules responsible for movement in opposite directions are probably activated and inactivated in a coordinated fashion so that the cilia or flagella can move back and forth. The radial spoke has been proposed as the (or one of the) structures that synchronizes this movement.

The regulation of axonemal dynein activity is critical for flagellar beat frequency and cilia waveform. Modes of axonemal dynein regulation include phosphorylation, redox, and calcium. Mechanical forces on the axoneme also affect axonemal dynein function. The heavy chains of inner and outer arms of axonemal dynein are phosphorylated/dephosphorylated to control the rate of microtubule sliding. Thioredoxins associated with the other axonemal dynein arms are oxidized/reduced to regulate where dynein binds in the axoneme. Centerin and components of the outer axonemal dynein arms detect fluctuations in calcium concentration. Calcium fluctuations play an important role in altering cilia waveform and flagellar beat frequency (King, 2012).

== History ==
The protein responsible for movement of cilia and flagella was first discovered and named dynein in 1963 (Karp, 2005). 20 years later, cytoplasmic dynein, which had been suspected to exist since the discovery of flagellar dynein, was isolated and identified (Karp, 2005).

== Chromosome segregation during meiosis ==
Segregation of homologous chromosomes to opposite poles of the cell occurs during the first division of meiosis. Proper segregation is essential for producing haploid meiotic products with a normal complement of chromosomes. The formation of chiasmata (crossover recombination events) appears to generally facilitate proper segregation. However, in the fission yeast Schizosaccharomyces pombe, when chiasmata are absent, dynein promotes segregation. Dhc1, the motor subunit of dynein, is required for chromosomal segregation in both the presence and absence of chiasmata. The dynein light chain Dlc1 protein is also required for segregation, specifically when chiasmata are absent.

== See also ==
- Molecular motors
