= Radial spoke =

Structure in undulipodium

The radial spoke is a multi-unit protein structure found in the axonemes of eukaryotic cilia and flagella. Although experiments have determined the importance of the radial spoke in the proper function of these organelles, its structure and mode of action remain poorly understood.

== Cellular location and structure ==
The radial spoke shown in an axoneme cross-section

Radial spokes are T-shaped structures present inside the axoneme. Each spoke consists of a "head" and a "stalk," while each of these sub-structures is itself made up of many protein subunits. In all, the radial spoke is known to contain at least seventeen proteins, five in the head and twelve in the stalk. The spoke stalk binds to the A-tubule of each microtubule outer doublet, and the spoke head faces in towards the center of the axoneme (see illustration at right).

== Function ==
The radial spoke is known to play a role in the mechanical movement of the flagellum/cilium. For example, mutant organisms lacking properly functioning radial spokes have flagella and cilia that are immotile. Radial spokes also influence the cilium "waveform"; that is, the exact bending pattern the cilium repeats.

How the radial spoke carries out this function is poorly understood. Radial spokes are believed to interact with both the central pair microtubules and the dynein arms, perhaps in a way that maintains the rhythmic activation of the dynein motors. For example, one of the radial spoke subunits, RSP3, is an anchor protein predicted to hold another protein called protein kinase A (PKA). PKA would theoretically then be able to activate/inactivate the adjacent dynein arms via its kinase activity.

== Proteins ==
Human axonemal radial spoke subunits: RSPH1, RSPH3, RSPH4A, RSPH6A, RSPH9, RSPH10B, RSPH10B2, RSPH14.
