= RSPH4A =

Protein-coding gene in the species Homo sapiens

Identifiers
- Aliases: RSPH4A, CILD11, RSHL3, RSPH6B, dJ412I7.1, radial spoke head 4 homolog A, radial spoke head component 4A
- External IDs: OMIM: 612647; MGI: 3027894; HomoloGene: 71779; GeneCards: RSPH4A; OMA:RSPH4A - orthologs

Gene location (Human)
Chr.	Chromosome 6 (human)
Band	6q22.1	Start	116,616,479 bp
Band	6q22.1	End	116,632,985 bp

Gene location (Mouse)
Chr.	Chromosome 10 (mouse)
Band	10|10 B1	Start	33,781,107 bp
Band	10|10 B1	End	33,792,017 bp
RNA expression pattern
Bgee	Human / Mouse (ortholog); Top expressed in: right uterine tube; olfactory zone of nasal mucosa; mucosa of paranasal sinus; bronchial epithelial cell; gonad; epithelium of nasopharynx; testicle; anterior pituitary; right lung; ventricular zone / Top expressed in: Epithelium of choroid plexus; olfactory epithelium; lumbar subsegment of spinal cord; otolith organ; utricle; transitional epithelium of urinary bladder; paraventricular nucleus of hypothalamus; right lung lobe; habenula; embryo; More reference expression data
BioGPS	n/a
Gene ontology
Molecular function	molecular function
Cellular component	cytoplasm; axoneme; radial spoke; cell projection; motile cilium; cilium; cytoskeleton; nucleus; nucleoplasm; nucleolus
Biological process	cilium movement; axoneme assembly; cilium assembly; cilium movement involved in cell motility
Sources:Amigo / QuickGO
Orthologs
Species	Human	Mouse
Entrez	345895	212892
Ensembl	ENSG00000111834	ENSMUSG00000039552
UniProt	Q5TD94	Q8BYM7
RefSeq (mRNA)	NM_001010892; NM_001161664	NM_001162957
RefSeq (protein)	NP_001010892; NP_001155136	NP_001156429
Location (UCSC)	Chr 6: 116.62 – 116.63 Mb	Chr 10: 33.78 – 33.79 Mb
PubMed search
- Wikidata
View/Edit Human	View/Edit Mouse

Radial spoke head protein 4 homolog A, also known as radial spoke head-like protein 3, is a protein that in humans is encoded by the RSPH4A gene.

== Function ==
TRadial spoke head protein 4 homolog A appears to be a component the radial spoke head, as determined by homology to similar proteins in the biflagellate alga Chlamydomonas reinhardtii and other ciliates. Radial spokes, which are regularly spaced along cilia, sperm, and flagella axonemes, consist of a thin 'stalk' and a bulbous 'head' that form a signal transduction scaffold between the central pair of microtubules and dynein.

== Clinical significance ==
Mutations in the RSPH4A gene are associated with primary ciliary dyskinesia.
