= RSPH6A =

Protein-coding gene in the species Homo sapiens

Identifiers
- Aliases: RSPH6A, RSHL1, RSP4, RSP6, RSPH4B, radial spoke head 6 homolog A
- External IDs: OMIM: 607548; MGI: 1927643; HomoloGene: 36476; GeneCards: RSPH6A; OMA:RSPH6A - orthologs

Gene location (Human)
Chr.	Chromosome 19 (human)
Band	19q13.32	Start	45,795,713 bp
Band	19q13.32	End	45,815,308 bp

Gene location (Mouse)
Chr.	Chromosome 7 (mouse)
Band	7|7 A3	Start	18,788,615 bp
Band	7|7 A3	End	18,808,372 bp
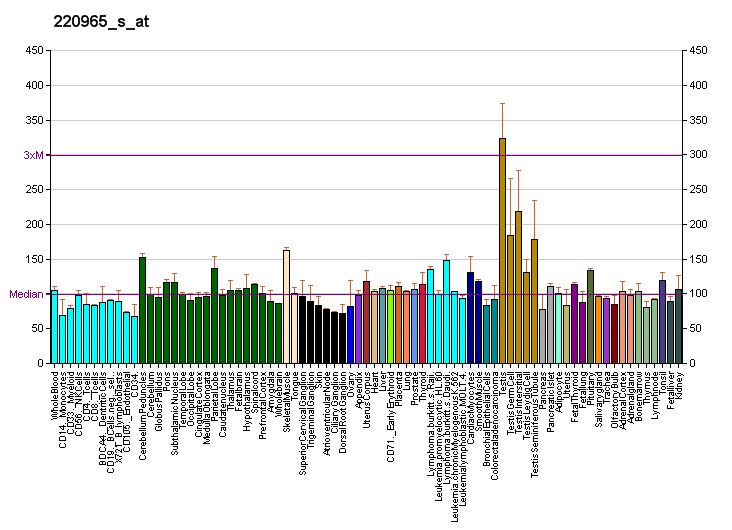
RNA expression pattern
Bgee	Human / Mouse (ortholog); Top expressed in: left testis; right testis; right lobe of thyroid gland; left lobe of thyroid gland; human penis; mucosa of nose; human musculoskeletal system; muscular system; muscle; muscle / Top expressed in: seminiferous tubule; spermatid; spermatocyte; lumbar subsegment of spinal cord; mucosa of small intestine; primary visual cortex; pancreas; islet of Langerhans; More reference expression data
BioGPS	More reference expression data
Orthologs
Species	Human	Mouse
Entrez	81492	83434
Ensembl	ENSG00000104941	ENSMUSG00000040866
UniProt	Q9H0K4	Q8CDR2
RefSeq (mRNA)	NM_030785	NM_001159671; NM_031255
RefSeq (protein)	NP_110412	NP_001153143; NP_112545
Location (UCSC)	Chr 19: 45.8 – 45.82 Mb	Chr 7: 18.79 – 18.81 Mb
PubMed search
- Wikidata
View/Edit Human	View/Edit Mouse

Radial spoke head protein 6 homolog A (RSPH6A) also known as radial spoke head-like protein 1 (RSHL1) is a protein that in humans is encoded by the RSPH6A gene.

== Function ==
Radial spoke head protein 6 homolog A is similar to a sea urchin radial spoke head protein. Radial spoke protein complexes form part of the axoneme of eukaryotic flagella and are located between the axoneme's outer ring of doublet microtubules and central pair of microtubules. In Chlamydomonas, radial spoke proteins are thought to regulate the activity of dynein and the symmetry of flagellar bending patterns.

== Clinical significance ==
The RSPH6A gene maps to a region of chromosome 19 that is linked to primary ciliary dyskinesia-2 (CILD2).
