= CCDC181 =

Protein-coding gene in humans

Identifiers
- Aliases: CCDC181, C1orf114, coiled-coil domain containing 181
- External IDs: MGI: 1922145; HomoloGene: 10912; GeneCards: CCDC181; OMA:CCDC181 - orthologs

Gene location (Human)
Chr.	Chromosome 1 (human)
Band	1q24.2	Start	169,394,870 bp
Band	1q24.2	End	169,460,669 bp

Gene location (Mouse)
Chr.	Chromosome 1 (mouse)
Band	1|1 H2.2	Start	164,103,154 bp
Band	1|1 H2.2	End	164,115,416 bp
RNA expression pattern
Bgee	Human / Mouse (ortholog); Top expressed in: sperm; bronchial epithelial cell; left testis; right testis; gonad; mucosa of paranasal sinus; anterior pituitary; olfactory zone of nasal mucosa; right uterine tube; testicle / Top expressed in: seminiferous tubule; spermatid; spermatocyte; zygote; otolith organ; utricle; facial motor nucleus; olfactory epithelium; otic vesicle; supraoptic nucleus; More reference expression data
BioGPS	n/a
Orthologs
Species	Human	Mouse
Entrez	57821	74895
Ensembl	ENSG00000117477	ENSMUSG00000026578
UniProt	Q5TID7	Q80ZU5
RefSeq (mRNA)	NM_001300968; NM_001300969; NM_021179; NM_001394007; NM_001394008 NM_001394009	NM_029115
RefSeq (protein)	NP_001287897; NP_001287898; NP_067002	NP_083391
Location (UCSC)	Chr 1: 169.39 – 169.46 Mb	Chr 1: 164.1 – 164.12 Mb
PubMed search
- Wikidata
View/Edit Human	View/Edit Mouse

Coiled-coil domain-containing protein 181 (CCDC181) is a protein that in human is encoded by C1orf114, which is located at the Chromosome 1 at 1q24.2. The accession is Q5T1D7. Researches have recently revealed that CCDC 181 is a microtubule-binding protein that interacts with murine Hook1 in haploid male germ cells and localizes to the sperm tail and motile cilia. The disruption of Hook1 may lead to inappropriate function of spermatogenesis. The dysfunction may be related to the abnormal head shape of sperm or distinctive structural changes in flagella in sperm, which can result in male infertility. An increased rate of my gene has found in the haploid phase of male cell during meiosis, thus it is believed to relate to sperm cell and aid in spermatogenesis.

== Expression ==
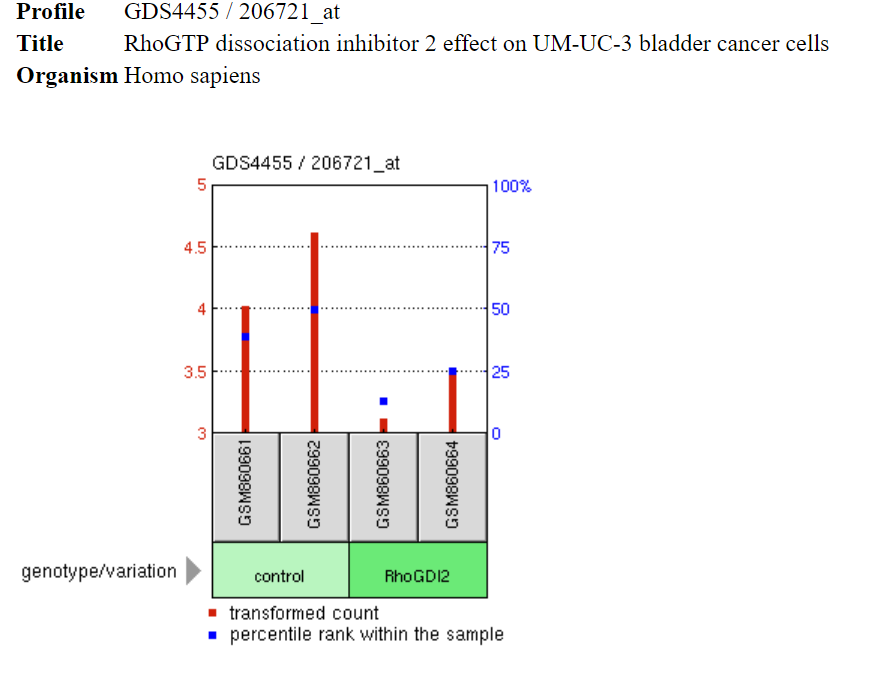
under expression of RhoGTP

It is discovered that a significant high expression of CCDC 181 found on human testis, which is a male reproductive gland. This is related to the study of its encoded protein-CCDC181, which relates to human infertility when in low expression. Also, high expression of protein is found in the olfactory area and cortical subplate. Researchers have studied the expression of CCDC 181 under different conditions. One of the outstanding findings is that under the coexistence of Rho GTP dissociation inhibitor, the expression of CCDC 181 is depressed. Rho GTP dissociation inhibitor has a phenomenal effect on bladder cancer cells, so studies have suggested that CCDC 181 might also be related to bladder cancer.

== Homology ==
Orthologs have been found mainly in eukaryotes, including mammals, birds, reptiles, amphibians and fishes, with the highest identity on the mammalian species.

Genus species	Common name	Divergence from humans (MYA)	NCBI mRNA accession	Sequence identity	Sequence similarity	Length (aa)
Homo sapiens	Humans	--	NM_001300968	--	--	508
Odobenus rosmarus divergens	Walrus	96	XP_012420860	86%	93%	507
Physeter catodon	Sperm whale	96	XP_007102112	84%	91%	509
Balaenoptera acutorostrata scammoni	Minke whale	96	XP_007172548	84%	90%	509
Ictidomys tridecemlineatus	Thirteen-lined ground squirrel	90	XP_021578354	81%	90%	507
Octodon degus	Degu	90	XP_023564408	80%	89%	537
Rousettus aegyptiacus	Egyptian fruit bat	96	XP_016004092	78%	88%	505
Pteropus vampyrus	Large flying fox	96	XP_023393329	78%	89%	522
Condylura cristata	star-nosed mole	96	XP_004688522	78%	87%	508
Mustela putorius furo	Ferret	96	XP_004756715	69%	78%	459
Nestor notabilis	Kea	312	XP_010014066	56%	72%	498
Pelodiscus sinensis	Chinese softshell turtle	312	XP_006112275	55%	73%	512
Sorex araneus	shrew	96	XP_012789334	55%	71%	502
Chelonia mydas	Green sea turtle	312	XP_007061692	54%	72%	517
Xenopus tropicalis	western clawed frog	352	XP_012813116	42%	61%	471
Lonchura striata domestica	society finch	312	XP_021404557	40%	61%	488
Nanorana parkeri	High Himalaya frog	352	XP_018423291	36%	56%	334
Scleropages formosus	Asian arowana	435	XP_018603557	35%	55%	389
Hippocampus comes	Tiger tail seahorse	435	XP_019735712	29%	44%	439
