= Nexin =

Protein in undulipodia

Nexin can be located on this cross-section of an axoneme

The Nexin, also called the dynein regulatory complex (DRC), is a proteinous inter-doublet linkage that prevents microtubules in the outer layer of axonemes from moving with respect to one another; otherwise, vesicular transport proteins such as dynein would dissolve the whole structure.

== Discovery ==
This complex was discovered independently by electron microscopy and genetic studies, giving it the names Nexin and dynein regulatory complex respectively. Later studies found that they were describing the same structure, and it is now sometimes called the nexin-dynein regulatory complex (N-DRC).

== See also ==
- Sorting nexin
