= SPMIP4 =

Protein-coding gene in the species Homo sapiens

Identifiers
- Aliases: SPMIP4, chromosome 7 open reading frame 31, C7orf31, Sperm Microtubule Inner Protein 4
- External IDs: OMIM: 616071; MGI: 1918071; GeneCards: SPMIP4

Gene location (Human)
Chr.	Chromosome 7 (human)
Band	7p15.3	Start	25,134,692 bp
Band	7p15.3	End	25,180,356 bp

Gene location (Mouse)
Chr.	Chromosome 6 (mouse)
Band	6|6 B2.3	Start	50,550,282 bp
Band	6|6 B2.3	End	50,573,612 bp
RNA expression pattern
Bgee	Human / Mouse (ortholog); Top expressed in: sperm; left testis; right testis; testicle; gonad; retinal pigment epithelium; monocyte; cartilage tissue; left adrenal gland; mucosa of transverse colon / Top expressed in: seminiferous tubule; spermatid; spermatocyte; embryo; embryo; granulocyte; tail of embryo; muscle of thigh; transitional epithelium of urinary bladder; skeletal muscle tissue; More reference expression data
BioGPS	n/a
Orthologs
Databases	NCBI: entry; OMA: entry
Species	Human	Mouse
Entrez	136895	70821
Ensembl	ENSG00000153790	ENSMUSG00000029828
UniProt	Q8N865	Q9D5Y0
RefSeq (mRNA)	NM_138811; NM_001371351; NM_001371352	NM_027564
RefSeq (protein)	NP_620166; NP_001358280; NP_001358281	NP_081840
Location (UCSC)	Chr 7: 25.13 – 25.18 Mb	Chr 6: 50.55 – 50.57 Mb
PubMed search
- Wikidata
View/Edit Human	View/Edit Mouse

Sperm-associated microtubule inner protein 4 is a protein that in humans is encoded by the gene SPMIP4 (previously C7orf31). The SPMIP4 protein is predicted to be part of the core (axoneme) of the sperm flagellum.

== Gene/Locus ==
In humans, the SPMIP4 gene is located at the locus 7p15.3 and stretches between position 25174316 and 25219817 (span 45502 bp). It codes for at least 4 unique human isoforms: the primary isoform (590 aa; also denoted X1, X2, and CRA_c), isoform X4 (346 aa), isoform CRA_a (580 aa), and isoform CRA_b (380 aa).

== Transcript ==
In humans, SPMIP4 codes for an mRNA strand that is 3609 base pairs long. The human mRNA is composed of a 5' untranslated region that is 561 bases and a 3' untranslated region that is 1275 bases long.

== Protein ==
The primary protein encoded by SPMIP4 in humans is 590 amino acids long with molecular weight 38334 Da. The protein is part of a functionally uncharacterized family of proteins (pfam15093) with a domain of unknown function (DUF4555).

== Protein Orthology ==
The SPMIP4 protein is well-conserved in mammals and birds, but is less conserved in more distant organisms.

SPMIP4 does not have any paralogs in humans.

== Expression ==
In humans, SPMIP4 is predicted to be localized in the cytosol, nucleus, mitochondrion, and peroxisome, and it is expressed in almost all tissues. It is highly expressed especially in the testes.

== Interaction ==
Two-hybrid studies have found interactions between the proteins encoded by A8K5H9 and SPMIP4, and another study has found the protein to interact with KBTBD5.

A study in 2014 found SPMIP4 to be a candidate as a centrosome-associated protein, using mass spectrometry on mammalian sperm cells’ centrioles. The protein appears in the study alongside seven other centrosome-associated protein candidates. Along with 2241 other proteins, SPMIP4 also exhibited significant binding in a microarray experiment to β-amyloids, a group of proteins associated with Alzheimer's disease. Finally, in a protein-protein interaction network study, SPMIP4 was found to associate with KLHL40, whose exact function is also not known.
