= DNAH9 =

Protein-coding gene in the species Homo sapiens

Identifiers
- Aliases: DNAH9, DNAH17L, DNEL1, DYH9, Dnahc9, HL-20, HL20, dynein axonemal heavy chain 9, CILD40
- External IDs: OMIM: 603330; MGI: 1289279; GeneCards: DNAH9

Gene location (Human)
Chr.	Chromosome 17 (human)
Band	17p12	Start	11,598,470 bp
Band	17p12	End	11,969,748 bp

Gene location (Mouse)
Chr.	Chromosome 11 (mouse)
Band	11 B3|11 40.53 cM	Start	65,722,108 bp
Band	11 B3|11 40.53 cM	End	66,059,377 bp
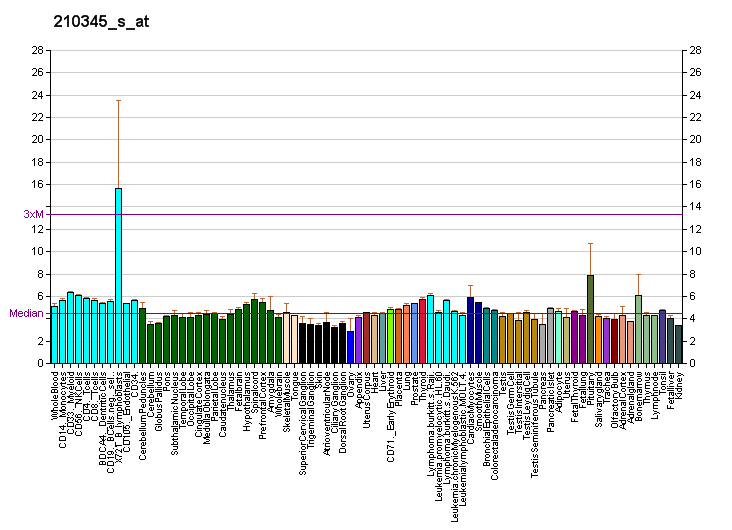

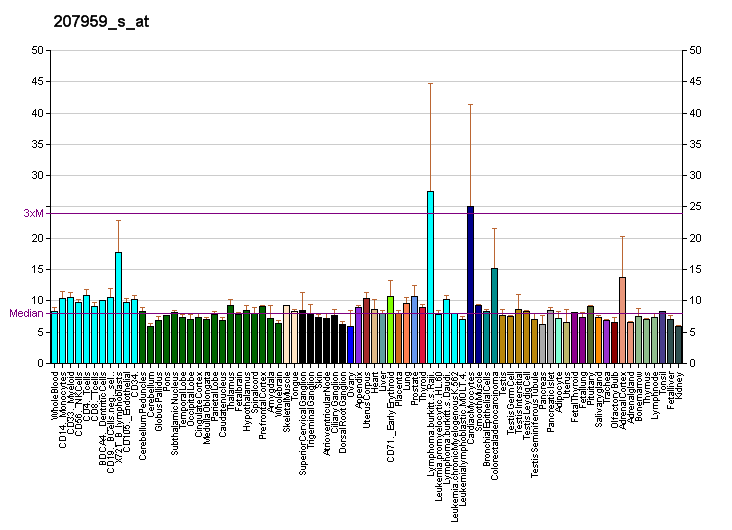
RNA expression pattern
Bgee	Human / Mouse (ortholog); Top expressed in: right uterine tube; bronchial epithelial cell; olfactory zone of nasal mucosa; mucosa of paranasal sinus; epithelium of nasopharynx; C1 segment; sperm; testicle; caudate nucleus; secondary oocyte / Top expressed in: choroidal fissure; zygote; secondary oocyte; choroid plexus of fourth ventricle; olfactory epithelium; primary oocyte; Epithelium of choroid plexus; embryo; neural layer of retina; dentate gyrus of hippocampal formation granule cell; More reference expression data
BioGPS	More reference expression data
Gene ontology
Molecular function	microtubule motor activity; nucleotide binding; ATPase activity; ATP binding; cytoskeletal motor activity; minus-end-directed microtubule motor activity; dynein light chain binding; dynein intermediate chain binding; dynein light intermediate chain binding
Cellular component	cytoplasm; axoneme; cell projection; cilium; microtubule; cytoskeleton; dynein complex; motile cilium; 9+2 motile cilium; distal portion of axoneme
Biological process	microtubule-based movement; cell projection organization; cilium movement
Sources:Amigo / QuickGO
Orthologs
Databases	NCBI: entry; OMA: entry
Species	Human	Mouse
Entrez	1770	237806
Ensembl	ENSG00000007174	ENSMUSG00000056752
UniProt	Q9NYC9	n/a
RefSeq (mRNA)	NM_001372; NM_004662	NM_001099633
RefSeq (protein)	NP_001363; NP_004653	n/a
Location (UCSC)	Chr 17: 11.6 – 11.97 Mb	Chr 11: 65.72 – 66.06 Mb
PubMed search
- Wikidata
View/Edit Human	View/Edit Mouse

Dynein heavy chain 9, axonemal is a protein that in humans is encoded by the DNAH9 gene.

This gene encodes the heavy chain subunit of axonemal dynein, a large multi-subunit molecular motor. Axonemal dynein attaches to microtubules and hydrolyzes ATP to mediate the movement of cilia and flagella. The gene expresses at least two transcript variants; additional variants have been described, but their full length nature has not been determined.
