= DYNLRB1 =

Protein-coding gene in the species Homo sapiens

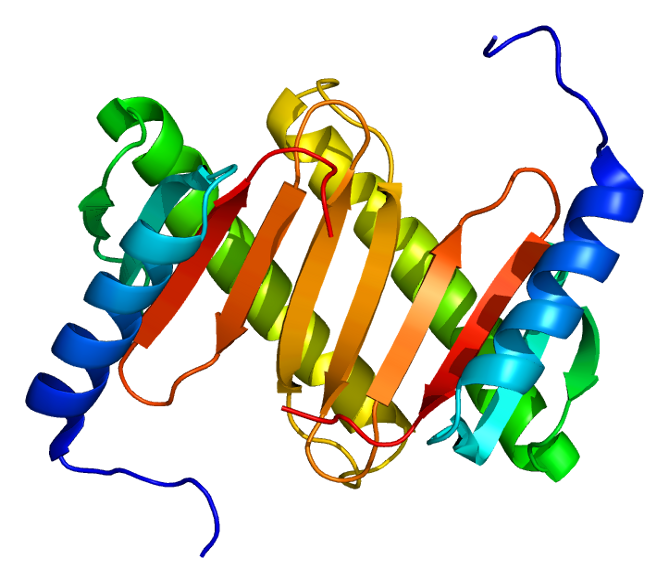

Identifiers
- Aliases: DYNLRB1, BITH, BLP, DNCL2A, DNLC2A, ROBLD1, dynein light chain roadblock-type 1
- External IDs: OMIM: 607167; MGI: 1914318; GeneCards: DYNLRB1
Available structures
PDB	Ortholog search: PDBe RCSB
PDB	List of PDB id codes 1Z09, 2B95, 2E8J, 2HZ5

Gene location (Human)
Chr.	Chromosome 20 (human)
Band	20q11.22	Start	34,516,409 bp
Band	20q11.22	End	34,540,958 bp

Gene location (Mouse)
Chr.	Chromosome 2 (mouse)
Band	2|2 H1	Start	155,078,453 bp
Band	2|2 H1	End	155,092,197 bp
RNA expression pattern
Bgee	Human / Mouse (ortholog); Top expressed in: Brodmann area 9; right frontal lobe; anterior cingulate cortex; right hemisphere of cerebellum; tibial nerve; C1 segment; islet of Langerhans; left coronary artery; popliteal artery; tibial arteries / Top expressed in: genital tubercle; supraoptic nucleus; tail of embryo; neural layer of retina; seminal vesicula; yolk sac; dentate gyrus of hippocampal formation granule cell; ascending aorta; aortic valve; ganglionic eminence; More reference expression data
BioGPS	n/a
Gene ontology
Molecular function	protein binding; microtubule motor activity; cytoskeletal motor activity; dynein intermediate chain binding
Cellular component	centrosome; ciliary tip; cytoskeleton; membrane; cytoplasm; microtubule; cilium; cytoplasmic dynein complex; dynein complex; outer dynein arm
Biological process	visual behavior; microtubule-based movement; intraciliary transport involved in cilium assembly; transport; response to light stimulus
Sources:Amigo / QuickGO
Orthologs
Databases	NCBI: entry; OMA: entry
Species	Human	Mouse
Entrez	83658	67068
Ensembl	ENSG00000125971	ENSMUSG00000047459
UniProt	Q9NP97	P62627
RefSeq (mRNA)	NM_001281727; NM_001281728; NM_001281729; NM_014183; NM_177953 NM_001319157	NM_001291108; NM_025947
RefSeq (protein)	NP_001306086; NP_054902; NP_001369294; NP_001369295; NP_001369296	NP_001278037; NP_080223
Location (UCSC)	Chr 20: 34.52 – 34.54 Mb	Chr 2: 155.08 – 155.09 Mb
PubMed search
- Wikidata
View/Edit Human	View/Edit Mouse

Dynein light chain roadblock-type 1 is a protein that in humans is encoded by the DYNLRB1 gene.

This gene is a member of the roadblock dynein light chain family and encodes a cytoplasmic protein that is capable of binding intermediate chain proteins. Upregulation of this gene has been associated with hepatocellular carcinomas, suggesting that this gene may be involved in tumor progression.
