= RSPH1 =

Protein-coding gene in the species Homo sapiens

Identifiers
- Aliases: RSPH1, CILD24, RSP44, RSPH10A, TSA2, TSGA2, CT79, radial spoke head 1 homolog, radial spoke head component 1
- External IDs: OMIM: 609314; MGI: 1194909; GeneCards: RSPH1

Gene location (Human)
Chr.	Chromosome 21 (human)
Band	21q22.3	Start	42,472,486 bp
Band	21q22.3	End	42,496,246 bp

Gene location (Mouse)
Chr.	Chromosome 17 (mouse)
Band	17 B1|17 15.94 cM	Start	31,473,993 bp
Band	17 B1|17 15.94 cM	End	31,496,357 bp
RNA expression pattern
Bgee	Human / Mouse (ortholog); Top expressed in: bronchial epithelial cell; right uterine tube; mucosa of paranasal sinus; olfactory zone of nasal mucosa; sperm; trachea; epithelium of nasopharynx; pancreatic ductal cell; caput epididymis; nasal epithelium / Top expressed in: seminiferous tubule; spermatocyte; spermatid; Epithelium of choroid plexus; olfactory epithelium; right lung lobe; utricle; vestibular sensory epithelium; left lung; left lung lobe; More reference expression data
BioGPS	n/a
Gene ontology
Molecular function	protein binding
Cellular component	cytoplasm; condensed nuclear chromosome; meiotic spindle; outer dense fiber; cytosol; cell projection; motile cilium; sperm flagellum; cilium; nucleus
Biological process	meiosis; axoneme assembly; spermatid development
Sources:Amigo / QuickGO
Orthologs
Databases	NCBI: entry; OMA: entry
Species	Human	Mouse
Entrez	89765	22092
Ensembl	ENSG00000160188	ENSMUSG00000024033
UniProt	Q8WYR4	Q8VIG3
RefSeq (mRNA)	NM_001286506; NM_080860	NM_025290; NM_001364916
RefSeq (protein)	NP_001273435; NP_543136	NP_079566; NP_001351845
Location (UCSC)	Chr 21: 42.47 – 42.5 Mb	Chr 17: 31.47 – 31.5 Mb
PubMed search
- Wikidata
View/Edit Human	View/Edit Mouse

Radial spoke head 1 homolog (RSPH1), also known as cancer/testis antigen 79 (CT79) or testis-specific gene A2 protein (TSGA2), is a protein that in humans is encoded by the RSPH1 gene.

== Function ==
This protein is a part of axoneme, which forms the core of a cilium or flagellum.

== Clinical significance ==
Mutations in RSPH1 are associated to Primary ciliary dyskinesia.
