= Hook protein =

Family of evolutionarily related proteins

HOOK protein

Identifiers
- Symbol: HOOK
- Pfam: PF05622
- InterPro: IPR008636
Available protein structures:
- PDB: IPR008636 PF05622 (ECOD; PDBsum)
- AlphaFold: IPR008636; PF05622

HOOK is a family of evolutionarily related proteins. This family consists of several HOOK1, 2 and 3 proteins from different eukaryotic organisms. The different members of the human gene family are HOOK1, HOOK2 and HOOK3. Different domains have been identified in the three human HOOK proteins, and it was demonstrated that the highly conserved N-terminal domain mediates attachment to microtubules, whereas the central coiled coil motif mediates homodimerization and the more divergent C-terminal domains are involved in binding to specific organelles (organelle-binding domains). It has been demonstrated that endogenous HOOK3 binds to Golgi membranes, whereas both HOOK1 and HOOK2 are localised to discrete but unidentified cellular structures. In mice the Hook1 gene is predominantly expressed in the testis. Hook1 function is necessary for the correct positioning of microtubular structures within the haploid germ cell. Disruption of Hook1 function in mice causes abnormal sperm head shape and fragile attachment of the flagellum to the sperm head.

== Examples ==
Proteins containing this domain include:

- HOOK1; HOOK2; HOOK3
