= TP53BP1 =

Protein-coding gene in the species Homo sapiens

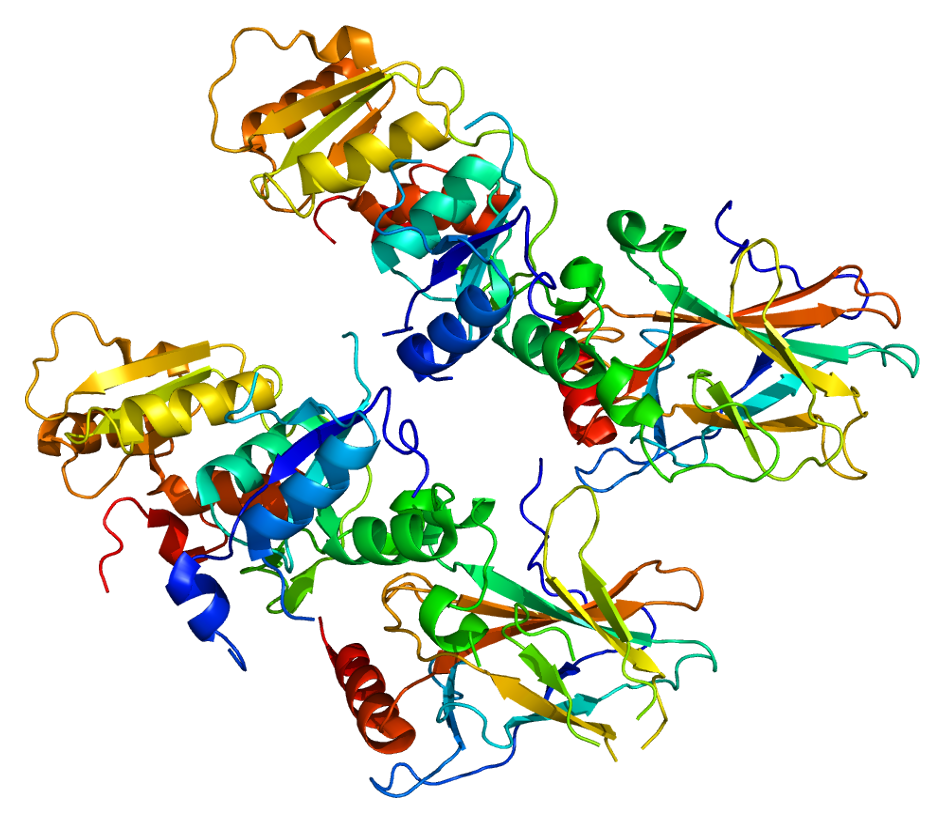

Identifiers
- Aliases: TP53BP1, 53BP1, p202, p53BP1, TP53, TDRD30, tumor protein p53 binding protein 1
- External IDs: OMIM: 605230; MGI: 1351320; GeneCards: TP53BP1
Available structures
PDB	Ortholog search: PDBe RCSB
PDB	List of PDB id codes 1GZH, 1KZY, 1XNI, 2G3R, 2IG0, 2LVM, 2MWO, 2MWP, 3LGF, 3LGL, 3LH0, 4CRI, 4RG2, 4X34, 5ECG

Gene location (Human)
Chr.	Chromosome 15 (human)
Band	15q15.3	Start	43,403,061 bp
Band	15q15.3	End	43,510,728 bp

Gene location (Mouse)
Chr.	Chromosome 2 (mouse)
Band	2|2 E5	Start	121,023,762 bp
Band	2|2 E5	End	121,101,888 bp
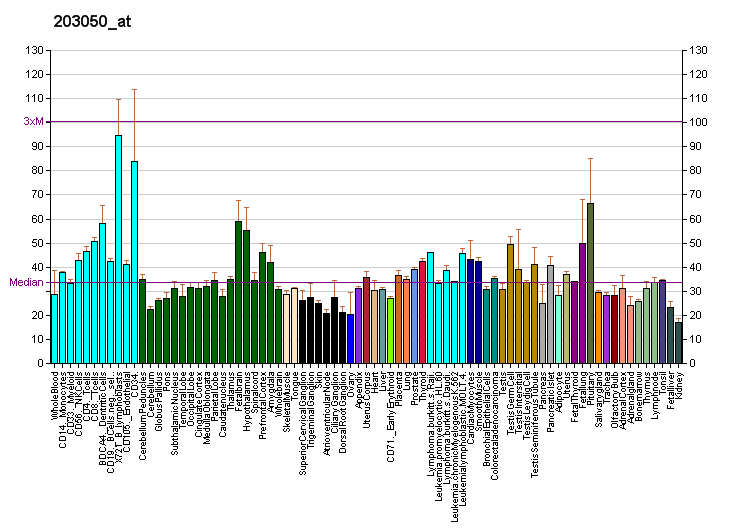
RNA expression pattern
Bgee	Human / Mouse (ortholog); Top expressed in: pituitary gland; anterior pituitary; gonad; ventricular zone; stromal cell of endometrium; Achilles tendon; right uterine tube; ganglionic eminence; middle temporal gyrus; sural nerve / Top expressed in: primary oocyte; ascending aorta; substantia nigra; secondary oocyte; ciliary body; fossa; renal corpuscle; Rostral migratory stream; aortic valve; condyle; More reference expression data
BioGPS	More reference expression data
Gene ontology
Molecular function	DNA binding; transcription coregulator activity; p53 binding; protein binding; ubiquitin modification-dependent histone binding; damaged DNA binding; methylated histone binding; telomeric DNA binding; sequence-specific DNA binding; histone binding
Cellular component	cytoplasm; nucleoplasm; chromosome; telomere; chromosome, centromeric region; kinetochore; nuclear body; nucleus; replication fork; site of double-strand break; DNA repair complex
Biological process	regulation of transcription, DNA-templated; cellular response to X-ray; DNA damage checkpoint signaling; positive regulation of DNA-binding transcription factor activity; transcription, DNA-templated; cellular response to DNA damage stimulus; positive regulation of transcription, DNA-templated; positive regulation of transcription by RNA polymerase II; DNA repair; protein homooligomerization; double-strand break repair via nonhomologous end joining; positive regulation of isotype switching; negative regulation of double-strand break repair via homologous recombination
Sources:Amigo / QuickGO
Orthologs
Databases	NCBI: entry; OMA: entry
Species	Human	Mouse
Entrez	7158	27223
Ensembl	ENSG00000067369	ENSMUSG00000043909
UniProt	Q12888	P70399
RefSeq (mRNA)	NM_001141979; NM_001141980; NM_005657; NM_001355001	NM_001290830; NM_013735
RefSeq (protein)	NP_001135451; NP_001135452; NP_005648; NP_001341930	NP_001277759; NP_038763
Location (UCSC)	Chr 15: 43.4 – 43.51 Mb	Chr 2: 121.02 – 121.1 Mb
PubMed search
- Wikidata
View/Edit Human	View/Edit Mouse

Tumor suppressor p53-binding protein 1 also known as p53-binding protein 1 or 53BP1 is a protein that in humans is encoded by the TP53BP1 gene.

== Clinical significance ==
53BP1 is underexpressed in most cases of triple-negative breast cancer.

== DNA repair ==
DNA double-strand breaks (DSBs) are cytotoxic damages that can be repaired either by the homologous recombinational repair (HR) pathway or by the non-homologous end-joining (NHEJ) pathway. NHEJ, although faster than HR, is less accurate. The early divergent step between the two pathways is end resection, and this step is regulated by numerous factors. In particular, BRCA1 and 53BP1 play a role in determining the balance between the two pathways. 53BP1 restricts resection and promotes NHEJ.

=== Age-associated deficient repair ===
Ordinarily during the G1 phase of the cell cycle, when a sister chromatid is unavailable for HR, NHEJ is the predominant pathway for repairing DNA double-strand breaks (DSBs). However, as individuals age, recruitment of 53BP1 to DSBs during G1 becomes deficient. The absence of 53BP1 at such DSBs appears to promote the alternative error-prone repair process Alt-EJ. This repair process, also referred to as microhomology-mediated end joining, is highly inaccurate and likely contributes to the aging process.

== Interactions ==
53BP1 has been shown to physically interact with:

- Histone H4 dimethylated or monomethylated at Lysine 20
- Histone H2A or Histone H2A.X ubiquitinated at Lysine 15
- p53
- DYNLL1
- TIRR (NUDT16L1)
