= HOOK2 =

Protein-coding gene in the species Homo sapiens

Identifiers
- Aliases: HOOK2, HK2, hook microtubule-tethering protein 2, hook microtubule tethering protein 2
- External IDs: OMIM: 607824; MGI: 2181664; GeneCards: HOOK2

Gene location (Human)
Chr.	Chromosome 19 (human)
Band	19p13.13	Start	12,763,003 bp
Band	19p13.13	End	12,872,740 bp

Gene location (Mouse)
Chr.	Chromosome 8 (mouse)
Band	8|8 C3	Start	84,990,603 bp
Band	8|8 C3	End	85,003,349 bp
RNA expression pattern
Bgee	Human / Mouse (ortholog); Top expressed in: right lobe of thyroid gland; apex of heart; left lobe of thyroid gland; body of pancreas; anterior pituitary; right uterine tube; minor salivary glands; skin of abdomen; mucosa of transverse colon; skin of leg / Top expressed in: spermatid; yolk sac; right kidney; proximal tubule; intestinal villus; spermatocyte; jejunum; Hindgut; seminiferous tubule; neural layer of retina; More reference expression data
BioGPS	n/a
Gene ontology
Molecular function	protein binding; identical protein binding; microtubule binding; dynein light intermediate chain binding
Cellular component	HOPS complex; cytoplasm; microtubule organizing center; centrosome; microtubule; cytoskeleton; FHF complex; cytosol; intracellular membrane-bounded organelle
Biological process	protein transport; lysosome organization; early endosome to late endosome transport; endocytosis; endosome organization; endosome to lysosome transport; cytoskeleton-dependent intracellular transport; cytoplasmic microtubule organization
Sources:Amigo / QuickGO
Orthologs
Databases	NCBI: entry; OMA: entry
Species	Human	Mouse
Entrez	29911	170833
Ensembl	ENSG00000095066	ENSMUSG00000052566
UniProt	Q96ED9	Q7TMK6
RefSeq (mRNA)	NM_001100176; NM_013312	NM_001167991; NM_133255; NM_001363497; NM_001363498
RefSeq (protein)	NP_001093646; NP_037444	NP_001161463; NP_573518; NP_001350426; NP_001350427; NP_001359286 NP_001359287; NP_001359288; NP_001359289; NP_001359290; NP_001359291
Location (UCSC)	Chr 19: 12.76 – 12.87 Mb	Chr 8: 84.99 – 85 Mb
PubMed search
- Wikidata
View/Edit Human	View/Edit Mouse

Protein Hook homolog 2 (HK2) is a protein that in humans is encoded by the HOOK2 gene.

== Function ==
Hook proteins are cytosolic coiled-coil proteins that contain conserved N-terminal domains, which attach to microtubules, and more divergent C-terminal domains, which mediate binding to organelles. The Drosophila Hook protein is a component of the endocytic compartment.
