= Dynein axonemal light chain 1 =

Protein-coding gene in the species Homo sapiens

DNAL1

Identifiers
- Aliases: DNAL1, C14orf168, CILD16, dynein axonemal light chain 1, LC1
- External IDs: OMIM: 610062; MGI: 1921462; GeneCards: DNAL1

Gene location (Human)
Chr.	Chromosome 14 (human)
Band	14q24.3	Start	73,644,875 bp
Band	14q24.3	End	73,703,732 bp

Gene location (Mouse)
Chr.	Chromosome 12 (mouse)
Band	12|12 D1	Start	84,161,140 bp
Band	12|12 D1	End	84,194,272 bp
RNA expression pattern
Bgee	Human / Mouse (ortholog); Top expressed in: buccal mucosa cell; left testis; right testis; bronchial epithelial cell; mucosa of paranasal sinus; Achilles tendon; corpus callosum; caput epididymis; islet of Langerhans; internal globus pallidus / Top expressed in: otolith organ; utricle; Region I of hippocampus proper; nucleus accumbens; temporal lobe; lateral septal nucleus; amygdala; dorsal striatum; piriform cortex; prefrontal cortex; More reference expression data
BioGPS	n/a
Gene ontology
Molecular function	alpha-tubulin binding; dynein heavy chain binding; cytoskeletal motor activity; protein binding
Cellular component	outer dynein arm; cytoplasm; cytoskeleton; microtubule; dynein complex; cell projection
Biological process	outer dynein arm assembly
Sources:Amigo / QuickGO
Orthologs
Databases	NCBI: entry; OMA: entry
Species	Human	Mouse
Entrez	83544	105000
Ensembl	ENSG00000119661	ENSMUSG00000042523
UniProt	Q4LDG9	Q05A62
RefSeq (mRNA)	NM_001201366; NM_031427	NM_028821; NM_001346528
RefSeq (protein)	NP_001188295; NP_113615	NP_001333457; NP_083097
Location (UCSC)	Chr 14: 73.64 – 73.7 Mb	Chr 12: 84.16 – 84.19 Mb
PubMed search
- Wikidata
View/Edit Human	View/Edit Mouse

Dynein axonemal light chain 1, (LC1) is a protein that in humans is encoded by the DNAL1 gene.

== Function ==
LC1 is a component of outer dynein arms, which contain the molecular motors for ATP-dependent cilia movement.

== Clinical significance ==
Mutations in the DNAL1 gene are associated with primary ciliary dyskinesia.
