= DYNLL1 =

Protein-coding gene in humans

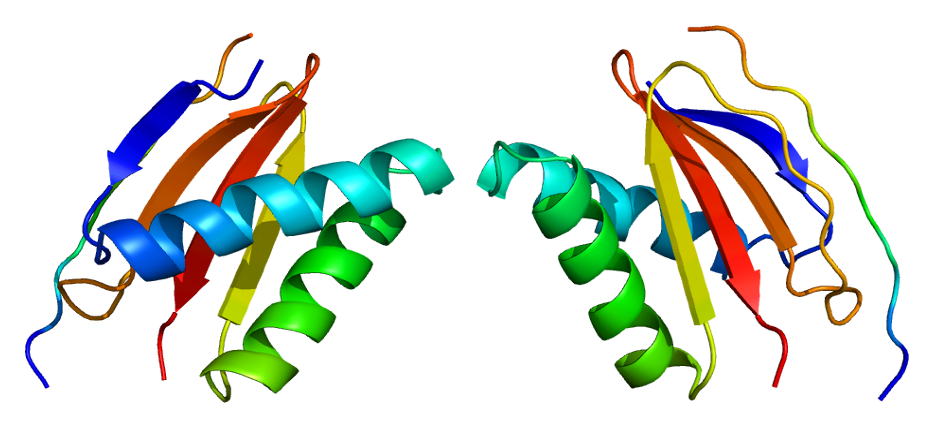

Identifiers
- Aliases: DYNLL1, DLC1, DLC8, DNCL1, DNCLC1, LC8, LC8a, PIN, hdlc1, dynein light chain LC8-type 1
- External IDs: OMIM: 601562; MGI: 1861457; GeneCards: DYNLL1
Available structures
PDB	Ortholog search: PDBe RCSB
PDB	List of PDB id codes 1CMI, 3ZKE, 3ZKF, 1F95, 1F3C, 1F96

Gene location (Human)
Chr.	Chromosome 12 (human)
Band	12q24.31	Start	120,469,850 bp
Band	12q24.31	End	120,498,493 bp

Gene location (Mouse)
Chr.	Chromosome 5 (mouse)
Band	5|5 F	Start	115,435,169 bp
Band	5|5 F	End	115,439,058 bp
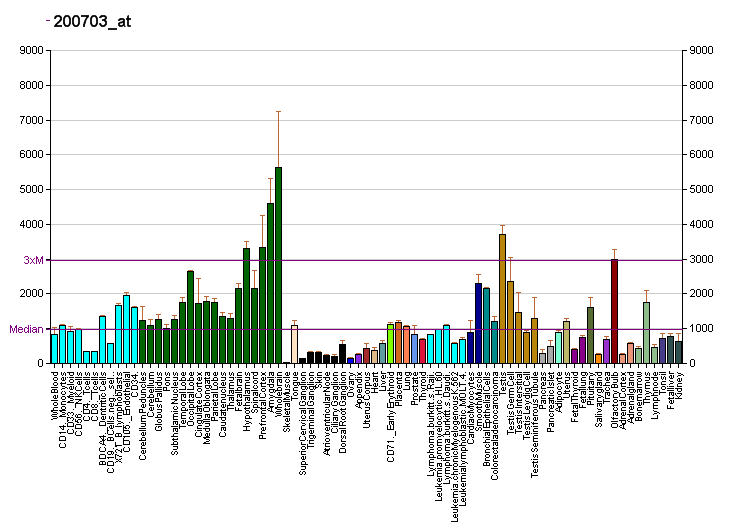
RNA expression pattern
Bgee	Human / Mouse (ortholog); Top expressed in: prefrontal cortex; frontal pole; gingival epithelium; cingulate gyrus; anterior cingulate cortex; Brodmann area 9; bronchial epithelial cell; right testis; Brodmann area 10; right frontal lobe / Top expressed in: medial ganglionic eminence; endocardial cushion; dentate gyrus of hippocampal formation granule cell; maxillary prominence; condyle; mandibular prominence; spermatid; hair follicle; seminiferous tubule; abdominal wall; More reference expression data
BioGPS	More reference expression data
Gene ontology
Molecular function	protein domain specific binding; protein C-terminus binding; protein binding; cytoskeletal motor activity; cytoskeletal protein binding; plus-end-directed microtubule motor activity; dynein intermediate chain binding; dynein light intermediate chain binding; enzyme binding; nitric-oxide synthase regulator activity; protein homodimerization activity; protein heterodimerization activity; scaffold protein binding
Cellular component	cytoplasm; cytosol; centrosome; membrane; plasma membrane; microtubule associated complex; ciliary tip; mitochondrion; dynein complex; COP9 signalosome; mitotic spindle; microtubule; cytoskeleton; extracellular exosome; nucleus; kinetochore; cytoplasmic dynein complex; cilium; tertiary granule membrane; ficolin-1-rich granule membrane; microtubule organizing center; secretory granule; axon cytoplasm
Biological process	regulation of transcription, DNA-templated; substantia nigra development; antigen processing and presentation of exogenous peptide antigen via MHC class II; transcription, DNA-templated; endoplasmic reticulum to Golgi vesicle-mediated transport; positive regulation of protein insertion into mitochondrial membrane involved in apoptotic signaling pathway; G2/M transition of mitotic cell cycle; microtubule-based process; intraciliary retrograde transport; viral process; negative regulation of phosphorylation; macroautophagy; apoptotic process; intraciliary transport involved in cilium assembly; neutrophil degranulation; motile cilium assembly; ciliary basal body-plasma membrane docking; positive regulation of non-motile cilium assembly; transport along microtubule; cilium assembly; sister chromatid cohesion; regulation of G2/M transition of mitotic cell cycle; transport; spermatid development; positive regulation of insulin secretion involved in cellular response to glucose stimulus
Sources:Amigo / QuickGO
Orthologs
Databases	NCBI: entry; OMA: entry
Species	Human	Mouse
Entrez	8655	56455
Ensembl	ENSG00000088986	ENSMUSG00000009013
UniProt	P63167	P63168
RefSeq (mRNA)	NM_003746; NM_001037494; NM_001037495	NM_019682
RefSeq (protein)	NP_001032583; NP_001032584; NP_003737	NP_062656
Location (UCSC)	Chr 12: 120.47 – 120.5 Mb	Chr 5: 115.44 – 115.44 Mb
PubMed search
- Wikidata
View/Edit Human	View/Edit Mouse

Dynein light chain 1, cytoplasmic is a protein that in humans is encoded by the DYNLL1 gene.

== Function ==
Cytoplasmic dyneins are large enzyme complexes with a molecular mass of about 1,200 kD. They contain two force-producing heads formed primarily from dynein heavy chains, and stalks linking the heads to a basal domain, which contains a varying number of accessory intermediate chains. The complex is involved in intracellular transport and motility. The protein described in this record is a light chain and exists as part of this complex but also physically interacts with and inhibits the activity of neuronal nitric oxide synthase. Binding of this protein destabilizes the neuronal nitric oxide synthase dimer, a conformation necessary for activity, and it may regulate numerous biologic processes through its effects on nitric oxide synthase activity. Alternate transcriptional splice variants have been characterized.

== Interactions ==
DYNLL1 has been shown to interact with:

- BCL2L11,
- DLG4
- DLGAP1,
- DYNC1I1,
- IκBα,
- MYO5A,
- NRF1,
- PAK1, and
- TP53BP1.
