= RSPH9 =

Protein-coding gene in the species Homo sapiens

Identifiers
- Aliases: RSPH9, C6orf206, CILD12, MRPS18AL1, radial spoke head 9 homolog, radial spoke head component 9
- External IDs: OMIM: 612648; MGI: 1922814; HomoloGene: 12606; GeneCards: RSPH9; OMA:RSPH9 - orthologs

Gene location (Human)
Chr.	Chromosome 6 (human)
Band	6p21.1	Start	43,645,036 bp
Band	6p21.1	End	43,672,600 bp

Gene location (Mouse)
Chr.	Chromosome 17 (mouse)
Band	17|17 C	Start	46,432,961 bp
Band	17|17 C	End	46,455,142 bp
RNA expression pattern
Bgee	Human / Mouse (ortholog); Top expressed in: bronchial epithelial cell; mucosa of paranasal sinus; right uterine tube; olfactory zone of nasal mucosa; nasal epithelium; gonad; left testis; right testis; epithelium of nasopharynx; testicle / Top expressed in: spermatid; spermatocyte; olfactory epithelium; Epithelium of choroid plexus; seminiferous tubule; seminal vesicula; lateral recess; utricle; right kidney; Region I of hippocampus proper; More reference expression data
BioGPS	n/a
Gene ontology
Molecular function	protein binding
Cellular component	cytoplasm; cell projection; motile cilium; cilium; cytoskeleton; axoneme; 9+2 motile cilium; radial spoke
Biological process	cilium movement involved in cell motility; cilium movement; motile cilium assembly; axoneme assembly; cilium assembly
Sources:Amigo / QuickGO
Orthologs
Species	Human	Mouse
Entrez	221421	75564
Ensembl	ENSG00000172426	ENSMUSG00000023966
UniProt	Q9H1X1	Q9D9V4
RefSeq (mRNA)	NM_001193341; NM_152732	NM_029338
RefSeq (protein)	NP_001180270; NP_689945	NP_083614
Location (UCSC)	Chr 6: 43.65 – 43.67 Mb	Chr 17: 46.43 – 46.46 Mb
PubMed search
- Wikidata
View/Edit Human	View/Edit Mouse

Radial spoke head protein 9 homolog is a protein that in humans is encoded by the RSPH9 gene.

== Function ==
This gene encodes a protein thought to be a component of the radial spoke head in motile cilia and flagellawhich then releases antibodies .

== Clinical significance ==
Mutation in this gene are associated with primary ciliary dyskinesia.
