= DNAL4 =

Protein-coding gene in the species Homo sapiens

Identifiers
- Aliases: DNAL4, PIG27, MRMV3, dynein axonemal light chain 4
- External IDs: OMIM: 610565; MGI: 1859217; GeneCards: DNAL4

Gene location (Human)
Chr.	Chromosome 22 (human)
Band	22q13.1	Start	38,778,508 bp
Band	22q13.1	End	38,794,198 bp

Gene location (Mouse)
Chr.	Chromosome 15 (mouse)
Band	15 E1|15 37.85 cM	Start	79,645,654 bp
Band	15 E1|15 37.85 cM	End	79,662,050 bp
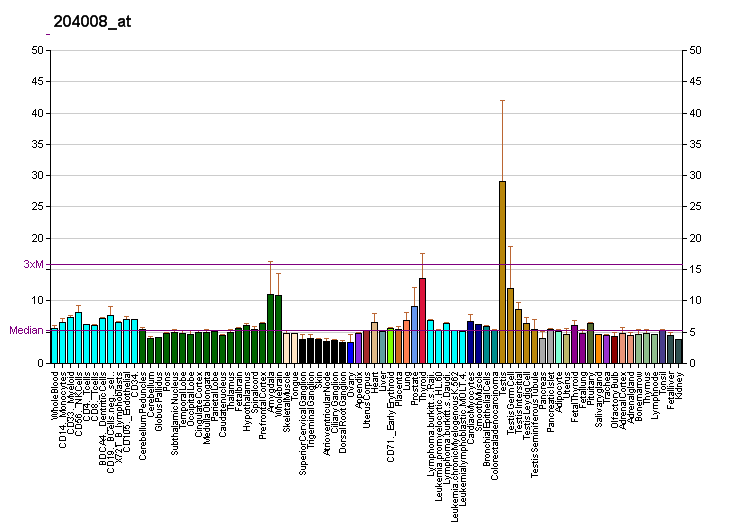
RNA expression pattern
Bgee	Human / Mouse (ortholog); Top expressed in: left testis; right testis; right uterine tube; anterior pituitary; oocyte; cingulate gyrus; anterior cingulate cortex; right lobe of thyroid gland; right frontal lobe; amygdala / Top expressed in: spermatid; zygote; spermatocyte; secondary oocyte; dentate gyrus of hippocampal formation granule cell; neural layer of retina; entorhinal cortex; seminiferous tubule; ventricular zone; right kidney; More reference expression data
BioGPS	More reference expression data
Gene ontology
Molecular function	cytoskeletal motor activity; protein binding; microtubule motor activity; cytoskeletal protein binding; plus-end-directed microtubule motor activity; dynein intermediate chain binding; dynein light intermediate chain binding
Cellular component	cytoplasm; plasma membrane; cell projection; cilium; microtubule; cytoskeleton; dynein complex
Biological process	microtubule-based process; microtubule-based movement
Sources:Amigo / QuickGO
Orthologs
Databases	NCBI: entry; OMA: entry
Species	Human	Mouse
Entrez	10126	54152
Ensembl	ENSG00000100246	ENSMUSG00000022420
UniProt	O96015	Q9DCM4
RefSeq (mRNA)	NM_005740	NM_017470
RefSeq (protein)	NP_005731	NP_059498
Location (UCSC)	Chr 22: 38.78 – 38.79 Mb	Chr 15: 79.65 – 79.66 Mb
PubMed search
- Wikidata
View/Edit Human	View/Edit Mouse

Dynein light chain 4, axonemal is a protein that in humans is encoded by the DNAL4 gene.
