= DYNLT1 =

Protein-coding gene in the species Homo sapiens

Identifiers
- Aliases: DYNLT1, CW-1, TCTEL1, tctex-1, dynein light chain Tctex-type 1, TCTEX1
- External IDs: OMIM: 601554; MGI: 98643; GeneCards: DYNLT1

Gene location (Human)
Chr.	Chromosome 6 (human)
Band	6q25.3	Start	158,636,474 bp
Band	6q25.3	End	158,644,743 bp

Gene location (Mouse)
Chr.	Chromosome 17 (mouse)
Band	17 A1|17 3.97 cM	Start	6,697,511 bp
Band	17 A1|17 3.97 cM	End	6,703,695 bp
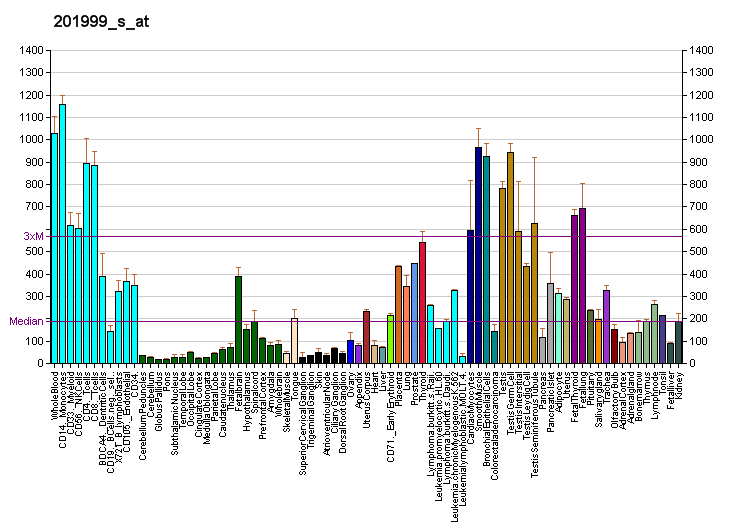
RNA expression pattern
Bgee	Human / Mouse (ortholog); Top expressed in: bronchial epithelial cell; epithelium of nasopharynx; olfactory zone of nasal mucosa; palpebral conjunctiva; nasal epithelium; oral cavity; ganglionic eminence; islet of Langerhans; jejunal mucosa; mucosa of paranasal sinus / Top expressed in: spermatid; spermatocyte; neural tube; mesencephalon; lens; testicle; islet of Langerhans; granulocyte; epiblast; urinary bladder; More reference expression data
BioGPS	More reference expression data
Gene ontology
Molecular function	protein binding; identical protein binding; cytoskeletal motor activity; protein C-terminus binding
Cellular component	cytoplasm; Golgi apparatus; secretory vesicle; spindle; dynein complex; cytoplasmic microtubule; microtubule; cytoskeleton; host cell; extracellular region; cytoplasmic dynein complex; secretory granule lumen; ficolin-1-rich granule lumen; mitochondrion; lamellipodium; soma; axonal growth cone
Biological process	intracellular transport of viral protein in host cell; regulation of G protein-coupled receptor signaling pathway; negative regulation of neurogenesis; nervous system development; cell division; establishment of mitotic spindle orientation; microtubule-dependent intracellular transport of viral material towards nucleus; viral entry into host cell; cell cycle; viral process; transport of viral material towards nucleus; neutrophil degranulation; positive regulation of neuron projection development; dendrite development; positive regulation of Rac protein signal transduction; negative regulation of mitochondrial membrane permeability; regulation of GTPase activity; neuron projection morphogenesis; regulation of cytoskeleton organization; negative regulation of cell death; axon development
Sources:Amigo / QuickGO
Orthologs
Databases	NCBI: entry; OMA: entry
Species	Human	Mouse
Entrez	6993	21648
Ensembl	ENSG00000146425	ENSMUSG00000096255
UniProt	P63172	P51807
RefSeq (mRNA)	NM_006519; NM_001291602; NM_001291603	NM_009342
RefSeq (protein)	NP_001278531; NP_001278532; NP_006510	NP_001160099; NP_001186877; NP_001160102; NP_001160101; NP_033368
Location (UCSC)	Chr 6: 158.64 – 158.64 Mb	Chr 17: 6.7 – 6.7 Mb
PubMed search
- Wikidata
View/Edit Human	View/Edit Mouse

Dynein light chain Tctex-type 1 is a protein that in humans is encoded by the DYNLT1 gene.

Cytoplasmic dynein is the major motor protein complex responsible for minus-end, microtubule-based motile processes. Each dynein complex consists of 2 heavy chains that have ATPase and motor activities, plus a group of accessory polypeptides. TCTEX1 is a dynein light chain involved in cargo binding (Chuang et al., 2005).[supplied by OMIM]

In cancer patients, DYNLT1 expression has been linked to both higher and lower survival rates, depending on cancer type.
