= DYNC1I2 =

Protein-coding gene in the species Homo sapiens

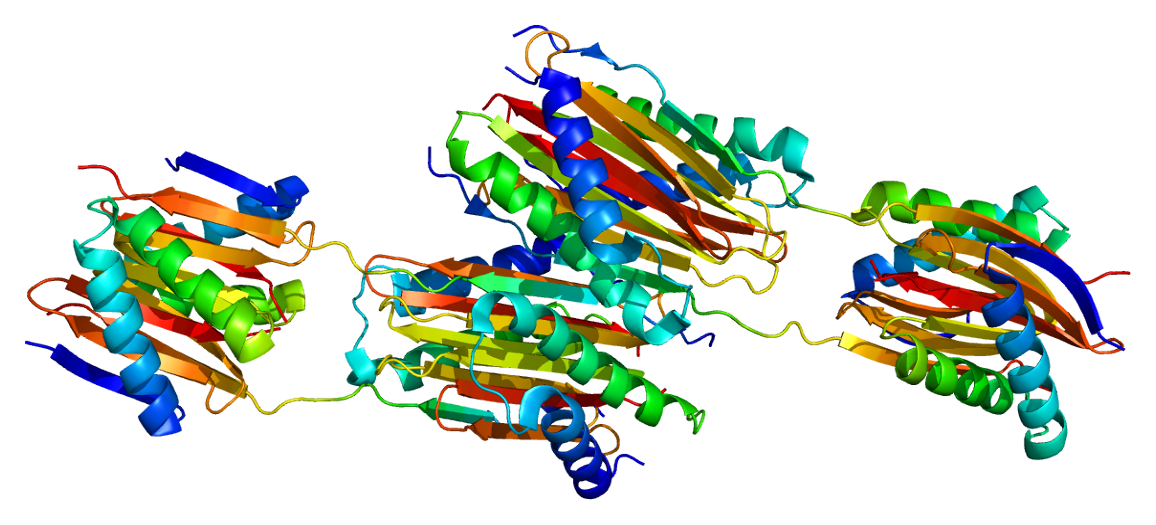

Identifiers
- Aliases: DYNC1I2, DNCI2, IC2, DIC74, dynein cytoplasmic 1 intermediate chain 2, NEDMIBA
- External IDs: OMIM: 603331; MGI: 107750; GeneCards: DYNC1I2

Gene location (Human)
Chr.	Chromosome 2 (human)
Band	2q31.1	Start	171,687,409 bp
Band	2q31.1	End	171,750,158 bp

Gene location (Mouse)
Chr.	Chromosome 2 (mouse)
Band	2 C2|2 42.38 cM	Start	71,042,050 bp
Band	2 C2|2 42.38 cM	End	71,093,647 bp
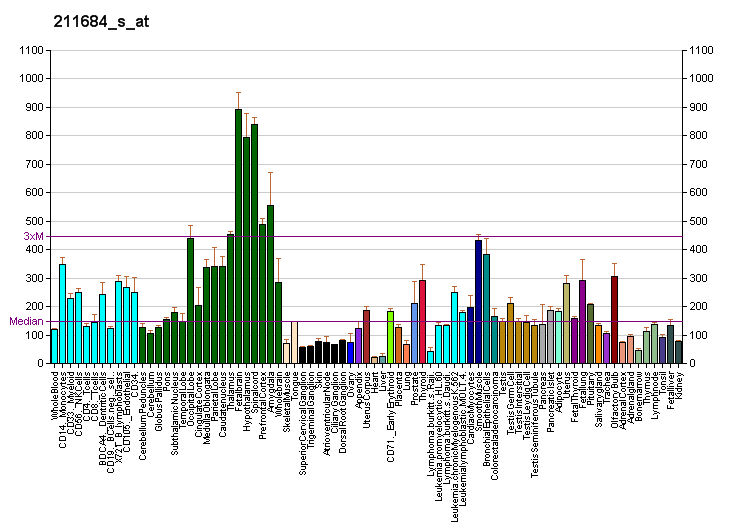
RNA expression pattern
Bgee	Human / Mouse (ortholog); Top expressed in: Achilles tendon; ganglionic eminence; C1 segment; ventricular zone; sural nerve; smooth muscle tissue; islet of Langerhans; popliteal artery; tibial arteries; Descending thoracic aorta / Top expressed in: genital tubercle; ganglionic eminence; spermatocyte; barrel cortex; medial ganglionic eminence; fossa; superior cervical ganglion; condyle; median eminence; zygote; More reference expression data
BioGPS	More reference expression data
Gene ontology
Molecular function	microtubule motor activity; protein binding; cytoskeletal motor activity; plus-end-directed microtubule motor activity; dynein light chain binding; dynein heavy chain binding
Cellular component	vesicle; cytosol; centrosome; dynein complex; cytoskeleton; cytoplasm; microtubule; cytoplasmic dynein complex
Biological process	antigen processing and presentation of exogenous peptide antigen via MHC class II; endoplasmic reticulum to Golgi vesicle-mediated transport; G2/M transition of mitotic cell cycle; viral process; microtubule-based movement; ciliary basal body-plasma membrane docking; transport along microtubule; regulation of G2/M transition of mitotic cell cycle
Sources:Amigo / QuickGO
Orthologs
Databases	NCBI: entry; OMA: entry
Species	Human	Mouse
Entrez	1781	13427
Ensembl	ENSG00000077380	ENSMUSG00000027012
UniProt	Q13409	O88487
RefSeq (mRNA)	NM_001271785; NM_001271786; NM_001271787; NM_001271788; NM_001271789 NM_001271790; NM_001378; NM_001320882; NM_001320883; NM_001320884; NM_001378455; NM_001378456	NM_001198872; NM_001198873; NM_001198874; NM_001198875; NM_001198876 NM_001198877; NM_001198878; NM_010064; NM_001347173
RefSeq (protein)	NP_001258714; NP_001258715; NP_001258716; NP_001258717; NP_001258718 NP_001258719; NP_001307811; NP_001307812; NP_001307813; NP_001369; NP_001365384; NP_001365385	NP_001185801; NP_001185802; NP_001185803; NP_001185804; NP_001185805 NP_001185806; NP_001185807; NP_001334102; NP_034194
Location (UCSC)	Chr 2: 171.69 – 171.75 Mb	Chr 2: 71.04 – 71.09 Mb
PubMed search
- Wikidata
View/Edit Human	View/Edit Mouse

Cytoplasmic dynein 1 intermediate chain 2 is a protein that in humans is encoded by the DYNC1I2 gene.
