= HOOK1 =

Protein-coding gene in humans

Identifiers
- Aliases: HOOK1, HK1, hook microtubule-tethering protein 1, hook microtubule tethering protein 1
- External IDs: OMIM: 607820; MGI: 1925213; GeneCards: HOOK1
Available structures
| PDB | Ortholog search: PDBe RCSB |
| PDB | List of PDB id codes 1WIX |

Gene location (Human)
| Chr. | Chromosome 1 (human) |
| Band | 1p32.1 | Start | 59,814,786 bp |
| Band | 1p32.1 | End | 59,876,322 bp |

Gene location (Mouse)
| Chr. | Chromosome 4 (mouse) |
| Band | 4 C5|4 44.17 cM | Start | 95,855,477 bp |
| Band | 4 C5|4 44.17 cM | End | 95,913,650 bp |
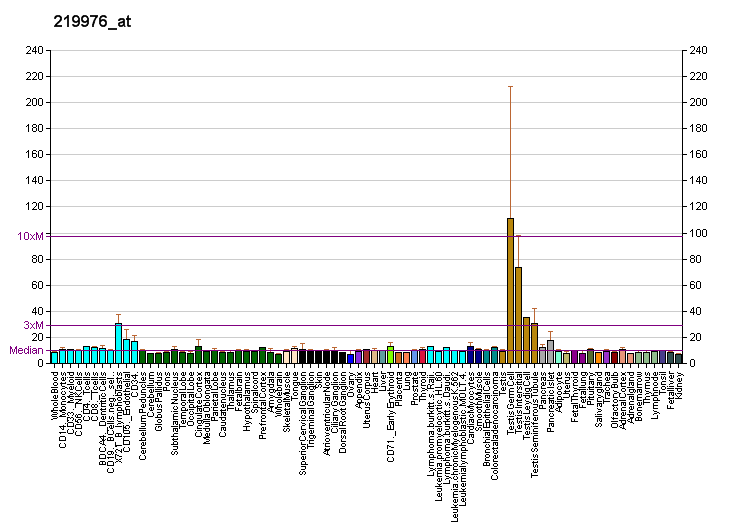
RNA expression pattern
| Bgee | Human / Mouse (ortholog); Top expressed in: sperm; left testis; right testis; body of pancreas; bronchial epithelial cell; islet of Langerhans; retinal pigment epithelium; jejunal mucosa; mucosa of colon; gingival epithelium / Top expressed in: spermatid; neural layer of retina; lacrimal gland; parotid gland; retinal pigment epithelium; ileum; otolith organ; utricle; left colon; spermatocyte; More reference expression data |
| BioGPS | More reference expression data |
Gene ontology
| Molecular function | actin binding; protein binding; identical protein binding; microtubule binding; dynein light intermediate chain binding |
| Cellular component | HOPS complex; cytoplasm; microtubule cytoskeleton; microtubule; cytoskeleton; FHF complex; cytosol; centrosome |
| Biological process | multicellular organism development; protein transport; cell differentiation; lysosome organization; early endosome to late endosome transport; spermatogenesis; endosome organization; spermatid development; endosome to lysosome transport; cytoskeleton-dependent intracellular transport; cytoplasmic microtubule organization; Golgi organization; manchette assembly |
Sources:Amigo / QuickGO
Orthologs
| Databases | NCBI: entry; OMA: entry |
| Species | Human | Mouse |
| Entrez | 51361 | 77963 |
| Ensembl | ENSG00000134709 | ENSMUSG00000028572 |
| UniProt | Q9UJC3 | Q8BIL5 |
| RefSeq (mRNA) | NM_015888 | NM_030014 |
| RefSeq (protein) | NP_056972 | NP_084290 |
| Location (UCSC) | Chr 1: 59.81 – 59.88 Mb | Chr 4: 95.86 – 95.91 Mb |
| PubMed search |
- Wikidata
| View/Edit Human | View/Edit Mouse |

Protein Hook homolog 1 is a protein that in humans is encoded by the HOOK1 gene.

== Function ==
This gene encodes a member of the hook family of coiled coil proteins, which bind to microtubules and organelles through their N- and C-terminal domains, respectively. The encoded protein localizes to discrete punctuate subcellular structures, and interacts with several members of the Rab GTPase family involved in endocytosis. It is thought to link endocytic membrane trafficking to the microtubule cytoskeleton. Several alternatively spliced transcript variants have been identified, but the full-length nature of some of these variants has not been determined.
