= RSPH14 =

Protein-coding gene in the species Homo sapiens

Identifiers
- Aliases: RSPH14, RTDR1, radial spoke head 14 homolog
- External IDs: OMIM: 605663; MGI: 1918486; GeneCards: RSPH14

Gene location (Human)
Chr.	Chromosome 22 (human)
Band	22q11.22-q11.23	Start	23,059,415 bp
Band	22q11.22-q11.23	End	23,145,021 bp

Gene location (Mouse)
Chr.	Chromosome 10 (mouse)
Band	10 B5.3|10	Start	74,793,309 bp
Band	10 B5.3|10	End	74,868,418 bp
RNA expression pattern
Bgee	Human / Mouse (ortholog); Top expressed in: bronchial epithelial cell; olfactory zone of nasal mucosa; left testis; right testis; gonad; testicle; right uterine tube; anterior cingulate cortex; Brodmann area 9; nucleus accumbens / Top expressed in: spermatocyte; seminiferous tubule; spermatid; embryo; lumbar subsegment of spinal cord; olfactory epithelium; embryo; vastus lateralis muscle; gastrula; sternocleidomastoid muscle; More reference expression data
BioGPS	n/a
Gene ontology
Molecular function	protein binding; molecular function
Cellular component	cellular component
Biological process	biological process
Sources:Amigo / QuickGO
Orthologs
Databases	NCBI: entry; OMA: entry
Species	Human	Mouse
Entrez	27156	71236
Ensembl	ENSG00000100218	ENSMUSG00000009070
UniProt	Q9UHP6	Q9D3W1
RefSeq (mRNA)	NM_014433	NM_001163533; NM_001163534; NM_001163535; NM_027730
RefSeq (protein)	NP_055248	NP_001157005; NP_001157006; NP_001157007; NP_082006
Location (UCSC)	Chr 22: 23.06 – 23.15 Mb	Chr 10: 74.79 – 74.87 Mb
PubMed search
- Wikidata
View/Edit Human	View/Edit Mouse

Radial spoke head 14 homolog is a protein that in humans is encoded by the RSPH14 gene.

== Function ==
This gene encodes a protein with no known function but with slight similarity to a yeast vacuolar protein. The gene is located in a region deleted in pediatric rhabdoid tumors of the brain, kidney and soft tissues, but mutations in this gene have not been associated with the disease.
