= DNAH7 =

Protein-coding gene in the species Homo sapiens

Identifiers
- Aliases: DNAH7, dynein axonemal heavy chain 7
- External IDs: OMIM: 610061; MGI: 2685838; GeneCards: DNAH7

Gene location (Human)
Chr.	Chromosome 2 (human)
Band	2q32.3	Start	195,737,703 bp
Band	2q32.3	End	196,068,837 bp

Gene location (Mouse)
Chr.	Chromosome 1 (mouse)
Band	1|1 C1.1	Start	53,436,165 bp
Band	1|1 C1.1	End	53,745,943 bp
RNA expression pattern
Bgee	Human / Mouse (ortholog); Top expressed in: right uterine tube; bronchial epithelial cell; buccal mucosa cell; mucosa of paranasal sinus; olfactory zone of nasal mucosa; testicle; caput epididymis; epithelium of nasopharynx; sperm; anterior pituitary / Top expressed in: mesenteric lymph nodes; subcutaneous adipose tissue; transitional epithelium of urinary bladder; left lobe of liver; brown adipose tissue; gastrula; intercostal muscle; body of femur; stroma of bone marrow; ankle; More reference expression data
BioGPS	n/a
Gene ontology
Molecular function	microtubule motor activity; calcium ion binding; nucleotide binding; cytoskeletal motor activity; ATP binding; minus-end-directed microtubule motor activity; dynein light chain binding; dynein intermediate chain binding; dynein light intermediate chain binding
Cellular component	inner dynein arm; dynein complex; cell projection; cilium; microtubule; cytoskeleton; cytoplasm; cytosol; axonemal dynein complex
Biological process	microtubule-based movement; inner dynein arm assembly; cilium movement; cilium-dependent cell motility
Sources:Amigo / QuickGO
Orthologs
Databases	NCBI: entry; OMA: entry
Species	Human	Mouse
Entrez	56171	627872
Ensembl	ENSG00000118997	ENSMUSG00000096141
UniProt	Q8WXX0	E9Q0T8
RefSeq (mRNA)	NM_018897	NM_001252070
RefSeq (protein)	NP_061720	NP_001238999
Location (UCSC)	Chr 2: 195.74 – 196.07 Mb	Chr 1: 53.44 – 53.75 Mb
PubMed search
- Wikidata
View/Edit Human	View/Edit Mouse

Dynein, axonemal, heavy chain 7 is a protein in humans that is encoded by the DNAH7 gene.

DNAH7 is a component of the inner dynein arm of ciliary axonemes (Zhang et al., 2002 [PubMed 11877439]).[supplied by OMIM, Mar 2008]. ##RefSeq-Attributes-START## Transcript_exon_combination_evidence :: AB023161.2, AF327442.1 [ECO:0000332] ##RefSeq-Attributes-END##
