= Dynein, axonemal, heavy chain 14 =

Protein found in humans

DNAH14

Identifiers
- Aliases: DNAH14, C1orf67, Dnahc14, HL-18, HL18, dynein axonemal heavy chain 14
- External IDs: OMIM: 603341; MGI: 2444525; GeneCards: DNAH14

Gene location (Human)
Chr.	Chromosome 1 (human)
Band	1q42.12	Start	224,896,262 bp
Band	1q42.12	End	225,399,292 bp

Gene location (Mouse)
Chr.	Chromosome 1 (mouse)
Band	1|1 H4- H5	Start	181,404,124 bp
Band	1|1 H4- H5	End	181,643,339 bp
RNA expression pattern
Bgee	Human / Mouse (ortholog); Top expressed in: left testis; right testis; body of pancreas; testicle; anterior pituitary; gonad; buccal mucosa cell; islet of Langerhans; ventricular zone; epithelium of colon / Top expressed in: spermatocyte; testicle; bone marrow; spermatid; zygote; secondary oocyte; granulocyte; thymus; primary oocyte; morula; More reference expression data
BioGPS	n/a
Gene ontology
Molecular function	microtubule motor activity; nucleotide binding; cytoskeletal motor activity; ATP binding; minus-end-directed microtubule motor activity; dynein light chain binding; dynein intermediate chain binding; dynein light intermediate chain binding
Cellular component	cytoplasm; cell projection; microtubule; cytoskeleton; cilium; dynein complex
Biological process	microtubule-based movement; cilium assembly
Sources:Amigo / QuickGO
Orthologs
Databases	NCBI: entry; OMA: entry
Species	Human	Mouse
Entrez	127602	240960
Ensembl	ENSG00000185842	ENSMUSG00000047369
UniProt	Q0VDD8	n/a
RefSeq (mRNA)	NM_001145154; NM_001373; NM_144989; NM_001349911; NM_001349912 NM_001367479; NM_001367481	NM_172846; NM_001377039
RefSeq (protein)	NP_001138626; NP_659426; NP_001336840; NP_001336841; NP_001354408 NP_001354410	n/a
Location (UCSC)	Chr 1: 224.9 – 225.4 Mb	Chr 1: 181.4 – 181.64 Mb
PubMed search
- Wikidata
View/Edit Human	View/Edit Mouse

Dynein, axonemal, heavy chain 14 is a protein that in humans is encoded by the DNAH14 gene.

== Function ==
Dyneins are microtubule-associated motor protein complexes composed of several heavy, light, and intermediate chains. Two major classes of dyneins, axonemal and cytoplasmic, have been identified. DNAH14 is an axonemal dynein heavy chain (DHC) (Vaughan et al., 1996 [PubMed 8812413]).
