= DNAH1 =

Protein-coding gene in the species Homo sapiens

Identifiers
- Aliases: DNAH1, DNAHC1, HDHC7, HL-11, HL11, HSRF-1, XLHSRF-1, dynein axonemal heavy chain 1, SPGF18, CILD37
- External IDs: OMIM: 603332; MGI: 107721; GeneCards: DNAH1

Gene location (Human)
Chr.	Chromosome 3 (human)
Band	3p21.1	Start	52,316,319 bp
Band	3p21.1	End	52,400,492 bp

Gene location (Mouse)
Chr.	Chromosome 14 (mouse)
Band	14 B|14 19.1 cM	Start	30,982,332 bp
Band	14 B|14 19.1 cM	End	31,045,853 bp
RNA expression pattern
Bgee	Human / Mouse (ortholog); Top expressed in: right uterine tube; bronchial epithelial cell; granulocyte; left testis; right testis; olfactory zone of nasal mucosa; right lobe of liver; right frontal lobe; bone marrow cell; tendon of biceps brachii / Top expressed in: spermatocyte; arcuate nucleus; seminiferous tubule; spermatid; supraoptic nucleus; median eminence; paraventricular nucleus of hypothalamus; ventromedial nucleus; vas deferens; dorsomedial hypothalamic nucleus; More reference expression data
BioGPS	n/a
Gene ontology
Molecular function	microtubule motor activity; nucleotide binding; ATPase activity; cytoskeletal motor activity; ATP binding; minus-end-directed microtubule motor activity; dynein light chain binding; dynein intermediate chain binding; dynein light intermediate chain binding
Cellular component	cytoplasm; inner dynein arm; cell projection; cilium; axonemal dynein complex; microtubule; cytoskeleton; dynein complex; axoneme; motile cilium; sperm flagellum; extracellular region
Biological process	microtubule-based movement; inner dynein arm assembly; cilium-dependent cell motility; cilium movement; sperm axoneme assembly; epithelial cilium movement involved in extracellular fluid movement; flagellated sperm motility; cilium movement involved in cell motility
Sources:Amigo / QuickGO
Orthologs
Databases	NCBI: entry; OMA: entry
Species	Human	Mouse
Entrez	25981	110084
Ensembl	ENSG00000114841	ENSMUSG00000019027
UniProt	Q9P2D7	E9Q8T7
RefSeq (mRNA)	NM_015512	NM_001033668
RefSeq (protein)	NP_056327	NP_001028840
Location (UCSC)	Chr 3: 52.32 – 52.4 Mb	Chr 14: 30.98 – 31.05 Mb
PubMed search
- Wikidata
View/Edit Human	View/Edit Mouse

Dynein axonemal heavy chain 1 is a protein that in humans is encoded by the DNAH1 gene.

== Function ==
This gene encodes an inner dynein arm heavy chain that provides structural support between the radial spokes and the outer doublet of the sperm tail. Naturally occurring mutations in this gene are associated with primary ciliary dyskinesia and multiple morphological anomalies of the flagella that result in asthenozoospermia and male infertility. Mice with a homozygous knockout of the orthologous gene are viable but have reduced sperm motility and are infertile. [provided by RefSeq, Feb 2017].
