= RSPH10B =

Protein-coding gene in the species Homo sapiens

Identifiers
- Aliases: RSPH10B, radial spoke head 10 homolog B
- External IDs: MGI: 1922386; GeneCards: RSPH10B

Gene location (Human)
Chr.	Chromosome 7 (human)
Band	7p22.1	Start	5,925,550 bp
Band	7p22.1	End	5,970,683 bp
RNA expression pattern
Bgee	Human / Mouse (ortholog); Top expressed in: right uterine tube; olfactory zone of nasal mucosa; right testis; left testis; gonad; testicle; right lung; left uterine tube; endometrium; anterior pituitary / n/a; More reference expression data
BioGPS	n/a
Orthologs
Databases	NCBI: entry; OMA: entry
Species	Human	Mouse
Entrez	222967	75136
Ensembl	ENSG00000155026	ENSMUSG00000075569
UniProt	P0C881	n/a
RefSeq (mRNA)	NM_173565	n/a
RefSeq (protein)	NP_775836	n/a
Location (UCSC)	Chr 7: 5.93 – 5.97 Mb	n/a
PubMed search
- Wikidata
View/Edit Human	View/Edit Mouse

Radial spoke head 10 homolog B is a protein that in humans is encoded by the RSPH10B gene. This protein is predicted to be part of the sperm flagellum. Near RSPH10B is a paralog, RSPH10B2, which encodes a protein that is said to be either identical or nearly identical, depending on the source.
