= RSPH3 =

Protein-coding gene in the species Homo sapiens

Identifiers
- Aliases: RSPH3, RSHL2, RSP3, dJ111C20.1, CILD32, radial spoke 3 homolog, radial spoke head 3 homolog, radial spoke head 3
- External IDs: OMIM: 615876; MGI: 1914082; HomoloGene: 12043; GeneCards: RSPH3; OMA:RSPH3 - orthologs

Gene location (Human)
Chr.	Chromosome 6 (human)
Band	6q25.3	Start	158,972,871 bp
Band	6q25.3	End	159,000,202 bp

Gene location (Mouse)
Chr.	Chromosome 17 (mouse)
Band	17|17 A1	Start	8,164,446 bp
Band	17|17 A1	End	8,198,656 bp
RNA expression pattern
Bgee	Human / Mouse (ortholog); Top expressed in: bronchial epithelial cell; tendon of biceps brachii; mucosa of ileum; mucosa of paranasal sinus; jejunal mucosa; nasal epithelium; myocardium of left ventricle; Achilles tendon; caput epididymis; epithelium of nasopharynx / Top expressed in: testicle; spermatocyte; primary oocyte; spermatid; pancreas; islet of Langerhans; lens; renal cortex; proximal tubule; ventricular zone; More reference expression data
BioGPS	n/a
Orthologs
Species	Human	Mouse
Entrez	83861	66832
Ensembl	ENSG00000130363	ENSMUSG00000073471
UniProt	Q86UC2	Q3UFY4
RefSeq (mRNA)	NM_031924; NM_001346418	NM_025789
RefSeq (protein)	NP_001333347; NP_114130	NP_080065
Location (UCSC)	Chr 6: 158.97 – 159 Mb	Chr 17: 8.16 – 8.2 Mb
PubMed search
- Wikidata
View/Edit Human	View/Edit Mouse

Radial spoke head protein 3 homolog (RSPH3), also known as radial spoke head-like protein 2 (RSHL2), is a protein that in humans is encoded by the RSPH3 gene.
