= HOOK3 =

Protein-coding gene in the species Homo sapiens

Identifiers
- Aliases: HOOK3, HK3, hook microtubule-tethering protein 3, hook microtubule tethering protein 3
- External IDs: OMIM: 607825; MGI: 2443554; GeneCards: HOOK3
Available structures
PDB	Ortholog search: PDBe RCSB
PDB	List of PDB id codes 5J8E

Gene location (Human)
Chr.	Chromosome 8 (human)
Band	8p11.21	Start	42,896,946 bp
Band	8p11.21	End	43,030,535 bp

Gene location (Mouse)
Chr.	Chromosome 8 (mouse)
Band	8|8 A2	Start	26,511,449 bp
Band	8|8 A2	End	26,609,252 bp
RNA expression pattern
Bgee	Human / Mouse (ortholog); Top expressed in: Achilles tendon; sural nerve; tendon of biceps brachii; epithelium of colon; pancreatic epithelial cell; corpus callosum; endothelial cell; buccal mucosa cell; internal globus pallidus; deltoid muscle / Top expressed in: otolith organ; utricle; knee joint; tibialis anterior muscle; hand; triceps brachii muscle; vastus lateralis muscle; Rostral migratory stream; tail of embryo; foot; More reference expression data
BioGPS	n/a
Gene ontology
Molecular function	microtubule binding; protein binding; identical protein binding; dynein light intermediate chain binding; dynactin binding; dynein light chain binding; dynein intermediate chain binding
Cellular component	HOPS complex; FHF complex; cis-Golgi network; centriolar satellite; microtubule; cytoskeleton; cytosol; pericentriolar material; cytoplasm; Golgi apparatus; centrosome
Biological process	endosome to lysosome transport; endosome organization; neuronal stem cell population maintenance; Golgi localization; early endosome to late endosome transport; cytoplasmic microtubule organization; protein transport; lysosome organization; microtubule anchoring at centrosome; interkinetic nuclear migration; negative regulation of neurogenesis; protein localization to centrosome; cytoskeleton-dependent intracellular transport
Sources:Amigo / QuickGO
Orthologs
Databases	NCBI: entry; OMA: entry
Species	Human	Mouse
Entrez	84376	320191
Ensembl	ENSG00000168172	ENSMUSG00000037234
UniProt	Q86VS8	Q8BUK6
RefSeq (mRNA)	NM_032410	NM_207659
RefSeq (protein)	NP_115786	NP_997542
Location (UCSC)	Chr 8: 42.9 – 43.03 Mb	Chr 8: 26.51 – 26.61 Mb
PubMed search
- Wikidata
View/Edit Human	View/Edit Mouse

Protein Hook homolog 3 is a protein that in humans is encoded by the HOOK3 gene.

== Function ==
Hook proteins are cytosolic coiled coil proteins that contain conserved N-terminal domains, which attach to microtubules, and more divergent C-terminal domains, which mediate binding to organelles. The Drosophila Hook protein is a component of the endocytic compartment.
