= DYNC1I1 =

Protein-coding gene in the species Homo sapiens

Identifiers
- Aliases: DYNC1I1, dynein, cytoplasmic 1, intermediate chain 1, DNCI1, DNCIC1, dynein cytoplasmic 1 intermediate chain 1
- External IDs: OMIM: 603772; MGI: 107743; GeneCards: DYNC1I1

Gene location (Human)
Chr.	Chromosome 7 (human)
Band	7q21.3	Start	95,772,506 bp
Band	7q21.3	End	96,110,322 bp

Gene location (Mouse)
Chr.	Chromosome 6 (mouse)
Band	6 A1|6 2.26 cM	Start	5,725,639 bp
Band	6 A1|6 2.26 cM	End	6,028,039 bp
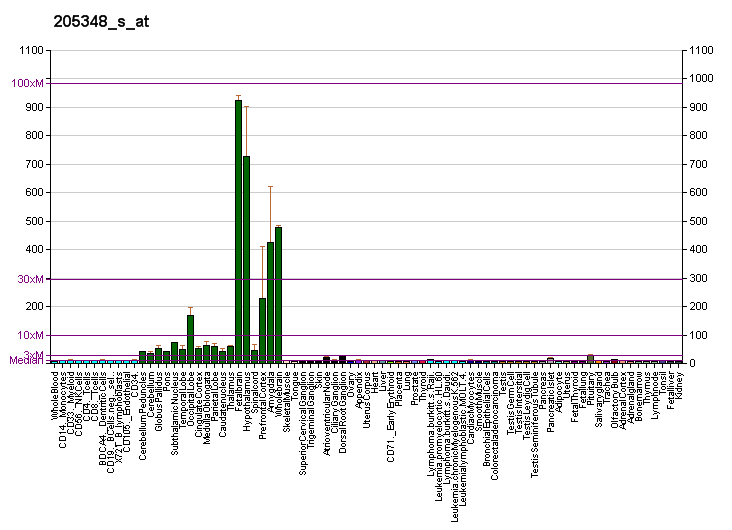
RNA expression pattern
Bgee	Human / Mouse (ortholog); Top expressed in: endothelial cell; pons; pars compacta; middle temporal gyrus; frontal pole; superior vestibular nucleus; cerebellar vermis; pars reticulata; Brodmann area 23; lateral nuclear group of thalamus / Top expressed in: pontine nuclei; ventral tegmental area; medulla oblongata; medial vestibular nucleus; dorsal tegmental nucleus; perirhinal cortex; deep cerebellar nuclei; lobe of cerebellum; barrel cortex; dorsomedial hypothalamic nucleus; More reference expression data
BioGPS	More reference expression data
Gene ontology
Molecular function	microtubule motor activity; spectrin binding; microtubule binding; protein binding; cytoskeletal motor activity; plus-end-directed microtubule motor activity; dynein light chain binding; dynein heavy chain binding
Cellular component	cytoplasm; recycling endosome; vesicle; cytosol; spindle pole; chromosome; perinuclear region of cytoplasm; dynein complex; cytoplasmic ribonucleoprotein granule; microtubule; chromosome, centromeric region; cytoskeleton; nucleus; kinetochore; cytoplasmic dynein complex
Biological process	antigen processing and presentation of exogenous peptide antigen via MHC class II; vesicle transport along microtubule; endoplasmic reticulum to Golgi vesicle-mediated transport; microtubule-based movement
Sources:Amigo / QuickGO
Orthologs
Databases	NCBI: entry; OMA: entry
Species	Human	Mouse
Entrez	1780	13426
Ensembl	ENSG00000158560	ENSMUSG00000029757
UniProt	O14576	O88485
RefSeq (mRNA)	NM_001135556; NM_001135557; NM_001278421; NM_001278422; NM_004411	NM_001191023; NM_001191025; NM_001191026; NM_001191027; NM_010063
RefSeq (protein)	NP_001129028; NP_001129029; NP_001265350; NP_001265351; NP_004402	NP_001177952; NP_001177954; NP_001177955; NP_001177956; NP_034193
Location (UCSC)	Chr 7: 95.77 – 96.11 Mb	Chr 6: 5.73 – 6.03 Mb
PubMed search
- Wikidata
View/Edit Human	View/Edit Mouse

Cytoplasmic dynein 1 intermediate chain 1 is a protein that in humans is encoded by the DYNC1I1 gene.

In melanocytic cells DYNC1I1 gene expression may be regulated by MITF.

== Interactions ==
DYNC1I1 has been shown to interact with DYNLL1.
