= DYNC1LI2 =

Protein-coding gene in the species Homo sapiens

Identifiers
- Aliases: DYNC1LI2, DNCLI2, LIC2, dynein cytoplasmic 1 light intermediate chain 2
- External IDs: OMIM: 611406; MGI: 107738; GeneCards: DYNC1LI2

Gene location (Human)
Chr.	Chromosome 16 (human)
Band	16q22.1	Start	66,720,893 bp
Band	16q22.1	End	66,751,609 bp

Gene location (Mouse)
Chr.	Chromosome 8 (mouse)
Band	8 D3|8 53.04 cM	Start	105,144,312 bp
Band	8 D3|8 53.04 cM	End	105,169,679 bp
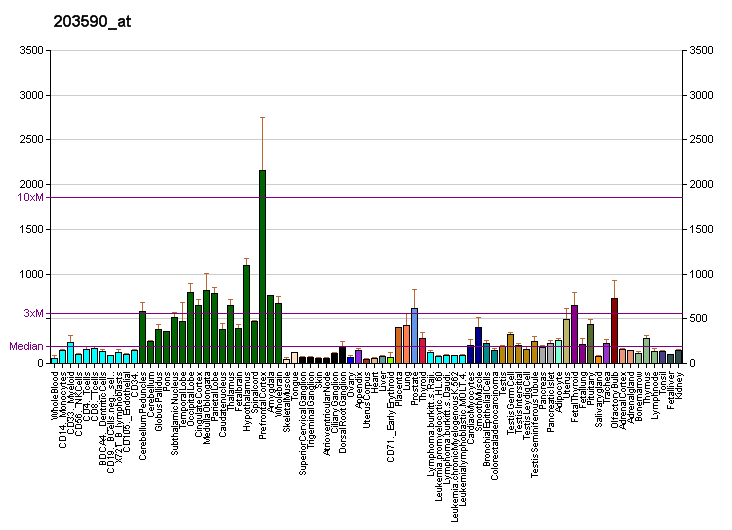
RNA expression pattern
Bgee	Human / Mouse (ortholog); Top expressed in: endothelial cell; inferior ganglion of vagus nerve; pars reticulata; subthalamic nucleus; external globus pallidus; internal globus pallidus; pars compacta; Brodmann area 23; superior vestibular nucleus; pons / Top expressed in: central gray substance of midbrain; hand; neural layer of retina; globus pallidus; superior frontal gyrus; cerebellar cortex; deep cerebellar nuclei; inferior colliculi; medial geniculate nucleus; pontine nuclei; More reference expression data
BioGPS	More reference expression data
Gene ontology
Molecular function	microtubule motor activity; nucleotide binding; cytoskeletal motor activity; ATP binding; dynein heavy chain binding
Cellular component	cytoplasm; cytosol; membrane; dynein complex; microtubule; cytoskeleton; cytoplasmic dynein complex; kinetochore; lysosome; late endosome; centrosome
Biological process	antigen processing and presentation of exogenous peptide antigen via MHC class II; centrosome localization; endoplasmic reticulum to Golgi vesicle-mediated transport; microtubule cytoskeleton organization; microtubule-based movement; sister chromatid cohesion; transport; protein homooligomerization; cellular response to nerve growth factor stimulus
Sources:Amigo / QuickGO
Orthologs
Databases	NCBI: entry; OMA: entry
Species	Human	Mouse
Entrez	1783	234663
Ensembl	ENSG00000135720	ENSMUSG00000035770
UniProt	O43237	Q6PDL0
RefSeq (mRNA)	NM_001286157; NM_006141; NM_001323955	NM_001013380
RefSeq (protein)	NP_001273086; NP_001310884; NP_006132; NP_006132.1	NP_001013398
Location (UCSC)	Chr 16: 66.72 – 66.75 Mb	Chr 8: 105.14 – 105.17 Mb
PubMed search
- Wikidata
View/Edit Human	View/Edit Mouse

Cytoplasmic dynein 1 light intermediate chain 2 is a protein that in humans is encoded by the DYNC1LI2 gene.
