= Axoneme =

Protein structure forming the core of cilia and flagella

- Eukaryotic flagellum. 1-axoneme, 2-cell membrane, 3-IFT (intraflagellar transport), 4-basal body, 5-cross section of flagellum, 6-triplets of microtubules of basal body.

- Cross section of an axoneme in a motile flagellum

Identifiers
- MeSH: D054468
- TH: H1.00.01.1.01017

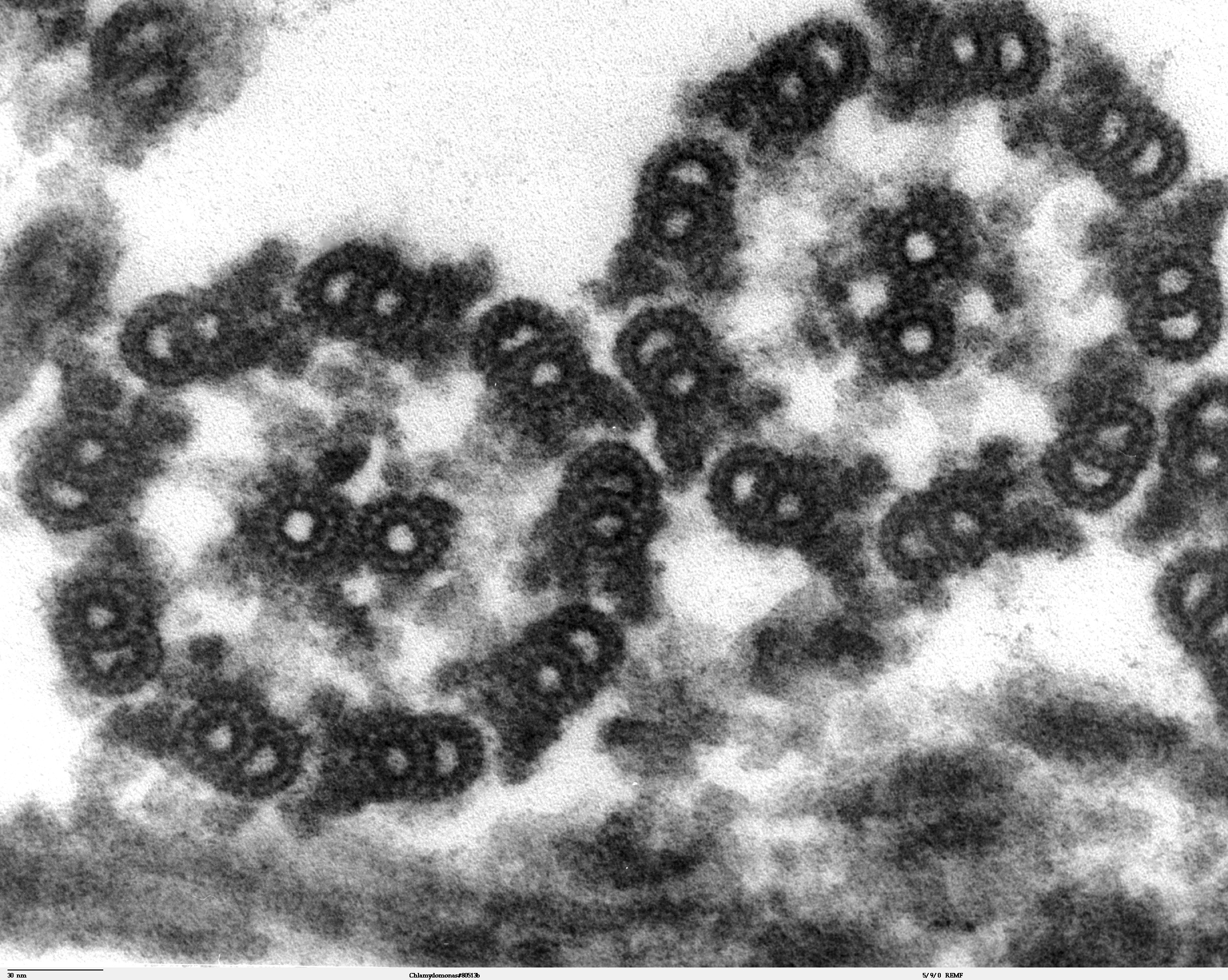
Electron micrograph of a thin cross-section through two Chlamydomonas axonemes

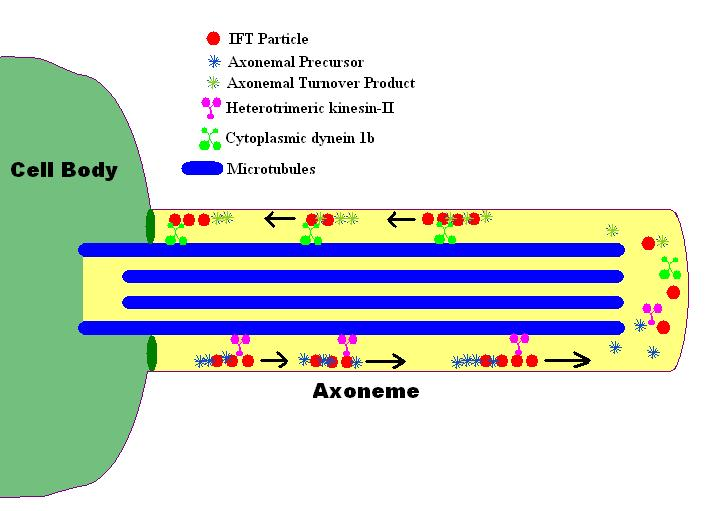
A simplified model of intraflagellar transport.

In molecular biology, an axoneme is the microtubule-based cytoskeletal structure that forms the core of a cilium or flagellum. Cilia and flagella are found on many eukaryotic cells, including both multicellular organisms and unicellular microorganisms. Motor proteins are attached to the axoneme of many cilia and flagella whose action causes periodic bending to drive cell swimming or motion of surrounding fluid, although not all cilia have motor proteins and can be unable to move. Though distinctions of function and length may be made between cilia and flagella, the internal structure of the axoneme is common to both.

== Structure ==
The axoneme is a microtubule-based structure. Each axoneme is composed of bundle of parallel microtubules aligned in a characteristic pattern. The axoneme of a typical motile cilium or flagellum has nine sets of doublet microtubules (a specialized structure consisting of two linked microtubules) found in a ring around a central pair of singlet microtubules. This is called a 9+2 axoneme. The axoneme confers the mechanical strength of cilia and flagella, and is the binding site of various protein complexes which includes dynein molecular motor proteins which confer the ability for bending and motility.

The outer doublet microtubules are also the tracks on which motor proteins walk. The walking action of axonemal dyneins bound to the neighbouring doublet microtubule lead to doublet microtubule sliding and subsequently axoneme bending which is the basis for flagellum/cilium beating. The walking action of kinesin-2 and cytoplasmic dyneins responsible for intraflagellar transport carry cargo proteins up and down the axoneme.

=== Primary cilia ===
Immotile cilia, including the primary cilium found on animal cells, typically lack the central pair microtubules (called a 9+0 axoneme). They also lack many of the microtubule doublet-bound protein complexes found in motile axonemes, including a lack of dynein arms. Primary cilia appear to serve sensory functions.

=== Motile cilia ===
Bound to the 9+2 axoneme microtubules, motile cilia and flagella axoneme contains many proteins and protein complexes necessary for axoneme motility function. The major complexes associated with the outer doublet microtubules are the inner and outer dynein arms, the radial spokes, and the nexin links, also called the dynein regulatory complex. The central pair microtubules are the centre of a structure called the central pair complex or central pair apparatus.

The dynein arms, are motor protein complexes that produce the force needed for bending. Each dynein arm is anchored to a doublet microtubule. By "walking" along an adjacent microtubule, the dynein motors can cause the microtubules to slide against each other. When this is carried out in a synchronized fashion, with the microtubules on one side of the axoneme being pulled 'down' and those on the other side pulled 'up,' the axoneme as a whole can bend back and forth. This process is responsible for ciliary/flagellar beating, as in the well-known example of the human sperm.

The radial spokes are "T"-shape complex which project from each set of outer doublets toward the central microtubules. The nexin links project from one outer doublet microtubule towards their neighbouring doublet. These complexes are important for normal axoneme motion, thought to be important in regulating the motion and/or conferring mechanical properties.

== History of discovery ==
The first investigation of sperm flagellar morphology was begun in 1888, by German cytologist Ballowitz, who observed using light microscopy and mordant stains that a rooster sperm flagellum could be splayed into as many as 11, longitudinal fibrils. About 60 years later, Grigg and Hodge in 1949 and a year later Manton and Clarke observed these 11 fibers in splayed flagella by electron microscopy (EM); these investigators proposed that two thinner fibers were surrounded by nine thicker outer fibers. In 1952, using advancements in fixation, embedding, and ultramicrotomy, Fawcett and Porter proved by EM thin sections that the core of epithelial cilia within the ciliary membrane consisted of nine doublet microtubules surrounding two central, singlet microtubules (i.e., the "central pair microtubule apparatus"), and hence the term, the "9 + 2" axoneme. Because of the high degree of evolutionary conservation between cilia and flagella from most species, our understanding of sperm flagella has been aided by studies of both organelles and from species ranging from protists to mammals. Cilia are typically short (5–10 μm) and beat in an oar-like fashion with an effective stroke followed by a recovery stroke. Flagella beat with a snake-like motion and are typically longer (generally 50–150 μm, but ranging from 12 μm to several mm in some species), with flagellar length in the protist Chlamydomonas being regulated by several genes encoding kinases. It was recognized first by Manton and Clarke that the 9 + 2 axoneme was possibly ubiquitous among species, and indeed, the nine doublet microtubules are evolutionary conserved structures that evolved in early eukaryotes nearly a billion years ago; however, there is wide variation among species with regard to the detailed structure of sperm flagella and their accessory structures. Axonemal doublet microtubules assemble from the ends of nine centriolar/basal body triplet microtubules, whose ninefold symmetry and clockwise pinwheel pattern (looking from inside the cell to the flagellar tip) is organized by the conserved protein of the SAS6 gene, and which is introduced into some eggs to establish the first mitotic spindle. The nine doublet microtubules are then connected around the axoneme by nexin links. Currently, the molecular structure of the axoneme is known to an extraordinary resolution of <4 nm through the use of cryo-electron tomography, as initially pioneered by Nicastro. Sperm flagellar (and ciliary) motility has been effectively analyzed in simple systems (e.g., protist flagella and sea urchin sperm), whose flagella contain several hundred polypeptides by proteomic analysis.

== Clinical significance ==
Mutations or defects in primary cilia have been found to play a role in human diseases. These ciliopathies include polycystic kidney disease (PKD), retinitis pigmentosa, Bardet–Biedl syndrome, and other developmental defects.
