= DNAH5 =

Protein-coding gene in the species Homo sapiens

Identifiers
- Aliases: DNAH5, CILD3, DNAHC5, HL1, KTGNR, PCD, dynein axonemal heavy chain 5
- External IDs: OMIM: 603335; MGI: 107718; GeneCards: DNAH5

Gene location (Human)
Chr.	Chromosome 5 (human)
Band	5p15.2	Start	13,690,328 bp
Band	5p15.2	End	14,011,818 bp

Gene location (Mouse)
Chr.	Chromosome 15 (mouse)
Band	15 B1|15 10.9 cM	Start	28,203,898 bp
Band	15 B1|15 10.9 cM	End	28,472,198 bp
RNA expression pattern
Bgee	Human / Mouse (ortholog); Top expressed in: bronchial epithelial cell; mucosa of paranasal sinus; epithelium of nasopharynx; olfactory zone of nasal mucosa; nasal epithelium; right uterine tube; pancreatic ductal cell; testicle; gonad; islet of Langerhans / Top expressed in: olfactory epithelium; lumbar spinal ganglion; secondary oocyte; right lung; dentate gyrus of hippocampal formation granule cell; spermatid; right lung lobe; primary visual cortex; triceps brachii muscle; trachea; More reference expression data
BioGPS	n/a
Gene ontology
Molecular function	nucleotide binding; ATPase activity; cytoskeletal motor activity; ATP binding; minus-end-directed microtubule motor activity; dynein light chain binding; dynein intermediate chain binding; dynein light intermediate chain binding; microtubule motor activity
Cellular component	cytoplasm; cell projection; cilium; dynein complex; microtubule; outer dynein arm; cytoskeleton; axoneme; 9+2 motile cilium; axonemal dynein complex; extracellular region
Biological process	flagellated sperm motility; outer dynein arm assembly; microtubule-based movement; cilium assembly; cilium movement; determination of left/right symmetry; development of the heart; lateral ventricle development; epithelial cilium movement involved in extracellular fluid movement
Sources:Amigo / QuickGO
Orthologs
Databases	NCBI: entry; OMA: entry
Species	Human	Mouse
Entrez	1767	110082
Ensembl	ENSG00000039139	ENSMUSG00000022262
UniProt	Q8TE73	Q8VHE6
RefSeq (mRNA)	NM_001369	NM_133365
RefSeq (protein)	NP_001360	NP_579943
Location (UCSC)	Chr 5: 13.69 – 14.01 Mb	Chr 15: 28.2 – 28.47 Mb
PubMed search
- Wikidata
View/Edit Human	View/Edit Mouse

Dynein axonemal heavy chain 5 is a protein that in humans is encoded by the DNAH5 gene.

DNAH5 is a protein-coding gene.^{1} It provides the instructions for synthesizing a protein that belongs to a microtubule-associated protein complex made of heavy, light and intermediate chains.^{2} DNAH5 is responsible for making the heavy chain 5, found within the outer dynein arms of cilia.^{1} It will function as a force generating protein by using ATP, producing the power stroke for cilia.^{3}

During early development, the cilia found on the primitive node will beat in a directional pattern, sending signaling molecules to the left, this process will begin to establish the internal left-right asymmetry.^{3} Mutations in DNAH5 are linked to primary ciliary dyskinesia, an autosomal recessive disorder.^{4} This disorder is characterized by recurrent respiratory infections, infertility, and abnormal organ placement.^{1} Non-functional DNAH5 proteins have been identified in individuals with primary ciliary dyskinesia and randomized left-right asymmetry.^{4}

== Associated Disorders and Knockout Studies ==
Mutations in DNAH5 are a common cause of primary ciliary dyskinesia, a rare autosomal recessive disorder that can lead to chronic respiratory infections, reduced fertility, and abnormal placement of internal organs^{6,8}. DNAH5 encodes a heavy chain protein found in the outer dynein arms of motile cilia, where it helps generate the force needed for normal ciliary beating^{6}. When DNAH5 is mutated, cilia cannot beat properly, and this can disrupt the movement of fluid and signaling molecules during early embryonic development. Because of this disruption, left-right patterning may fail^{6}., leading to situs inversus totalis, heterotaxy, or congenital heart defects^{7}.

Studies in patients with DNAH5 mutations have also shown that the protein may be absent from the ciliary axoneme or incorrectly localized, which helps explain the loss of ciliary function. In mouse knockout models, disruption of DNAH5 produces similar laterality defects^{6}, confirming that the gene is important for normal embryonic left-right asymmetry. These knockout studies also support the idea that defective nodal cilia movement is a major cause of the abnormal organ placement seen in affected humans^{9}.
