= DNAH11 =

Protein-coding gene in the species Homo sapiens

Identifiers
- Aliases: DNAH11, CILD7, DNAHBL, DNAHC11, DNHBL, DPL11, dynein axonemal heavy chain 11
- External IDs: OMIM: 603339; MGI: 1100864; GeneCards: DNAH11

Gene location (Human)
Chr.	Chromosome 7 (human)
Band	7p15.3	Start	21,543,039 bp
Band	7p15.3	End	21,901,839 bp

Gene location (Mouse)
Chr.	Chromosome 12 (mouse)
Band	12 F2|12 63.25 cM	Start	117,841,717 bp
Band	12 F2|12 63.25 cM	End	118,162,778 bp
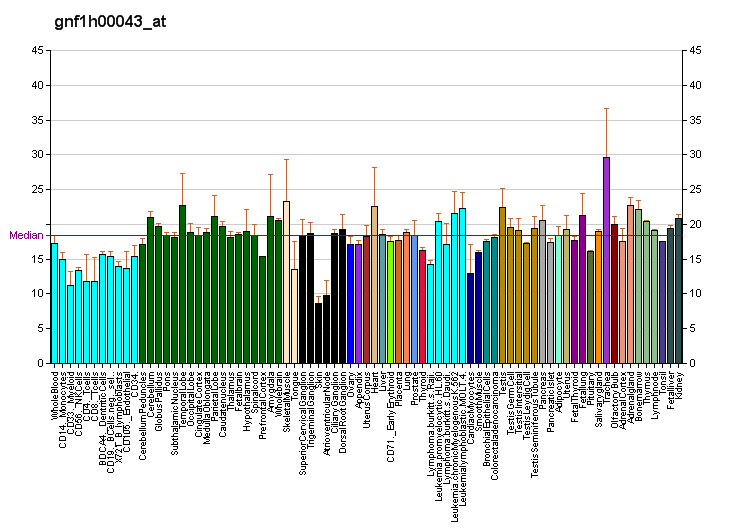
RNA expression pattern
Bgee	Human / Mouse (ortholog); Top expressed in: right uterine tube; bronchial epithelial cell; mucosa of paranasal sinus; right adrenal cortex; olfactory zone of nasal mucosa; caput epididymis; left adrenal gland; testicle; left adrenal cortex; gonad / Top expressed in: zygote; secondary oocyte; parotid gland; utricle; primary oocyte; cumulus cell; olfactory epithelium; Epithelium of choroid plexus; lens; vestibular sensory epithelium; More reference expression data
BioGPS	More reference expression data
Gene ontology
Molecular function	ATP binding; cytoskeletal motor activity; nucleotide binding; microtubule motor activity; ATPase activity; minus-end-directed microtubule motor activity; dynein light chain binding; dynein intermediate chain binding; dynein light intermediate chain binding
Cellular component	cell projection; cytoplasm; microtubule; cilium; cytoskeleton; dynein complex; motile cilium; axoneme; 9+0 motile cilium; 9+2 motile cilium; proximal portion of axoneme; extracellular region
Biological process	regulation of cilium beat frequency; microtubule-based movement; cilium movement; flagellated sperm motility; determination of left/right symmetry; development of the heart; epithelial cilium movement involved in extracellular fluid movement; learning or memory; determination of left/right asymmetry in nervous system; epithelial cilium movement involved in determination of left/right asymmetry; cardiac septum development; cardiac septum morphogenesis; determination of heart left/right asymmetry
Sources:Amigo / QuickGO
Orthologs
Databases	NCBI: entry; OMA: entry
Species	Human	Mouse
Entrez	8701	13411
Ensembl	ENSG00000105877	ENSMUSG00000018581
UniProt	Q96DT5	n/a
RefSeq (mRNA)	NM_001277115	NM_010060
RefSeq (protein)	NP_001264044	n/a
Location (UCSC)	Chr 7: 21.54 – 21.9 Mb	Chr 12: 117.84 – 118.16 Mb
PubMed search
- Wikidata
View/Edit Human	View/Edit Mouse

Dynein axonemal heavy chain 11 (DNAH11) is a protein that is encoded by the DNAH11 gene in humans. In mice, the protein is encoded by the Dnahc11 gene, the murine homolog to human DNAH11. The protein was previously known as 'left-right' dynein (with the corresponding gene alias lrd) in mice and is particularly notable during embryogenesis for orientation of the eventual body plan.

== Function ==
This gene encodes a member of the dynein heavy chain family, DNAH11, a microtubule-dependent motor ATPase protein critical for processes involving ciliary movement. The gene DNAH11 has reported associations in a number of important physiological processes including the movement of respiratory cilia, sperm motility, and establishment of the adult body plan. A knockout model of this gene has not been reported.

== Embryogenesis ==
The body plan is naturally asymmetrical, and the overall order is defined during embryonic gastrulation in mammals where the three germ layers (endoderm, mesoderm, and ectoderm) are established. At the beginnings of gastrulation, the primitive node serves as the organizer and has motile cilia on its surface. These cilia are responsible for directing increased amounts of nodal to the left side of the developing embryo, establishing asymmetry. For this reason, proper expression of DNAH11 is critical for correct establishment and subsequent development of the asymmetrical body plan.

== Clinical significance ==
=== Primary ciliary dyskinesia ===
Mutations in this DNAH11 have been implicated in causing Primary Ciliary Dyskinesia (PCD), formerly called 'immotile cilia syndrome', and results from abnormally motile or static cilia within the respiratory tract. PCD is characterized by bronchiectasis, frequent upper respiratory tract infections, and issues with fertility, and PCD individuals have increased rates of heterotaxy and situs inversus in approximately 50% of reported cases, a congenital condition in which some organs are mirrored to an abnormal side of the body cavity. Mutations in DNAH11 are also associated with Kartagener syndrome (PCD with situs inversus totalis, a congenital condition with a characteristic total inversion of the body plan and organs).

=== Fertility ===
Genetic errors with DNAH11 have been shown to cause a number of fertility-related effects in both sexes. Decreased motile cilia-specific expression of DNAH11 within the axoneme of sperm is associated with lower levels of sperm motility. For this reason, males with PCD are not sterile, but they are often infertile under conventional methods due to lack of sperm motility; however, there are cases of DNAH11 mutant males fathering offspring without intervention of assisted reproductive technologies. In females with PCD or Kartagener's syndrome, there are increased reports of subfertility and risk of ectopic pregnancy. Because females' fallopian tubes are lined with motile cilia which show identical motor protein composition to those observed in the respiratory tract, this is believed to result in the increased risks observed in case studies (although affected PCD females' cilia have not been directly analyzed so this remains inconclusive).
