= Manes Kartagener =

Swiss internist (1897–1975)

Manes Kartagener (7 January 1897 in Przemyśl, then Galicia, Austria-Hungary – 5 August 1975 in Zürich, Switzerland) was a Swiss internist of Polish-Jewish origins.

== Early life ==
His father, Lazar Kartagener, was both a rabbi and a small businessman. His mother, also from Przemyśl, was called Tzluva, née Guth. He went to a local school at first, then to a grammar school in present-day Lviv and, after matriculating there in 1915, he and his father moved to Switzerland in the following year. Kartagener himself said that his family name was of Sephardic origin and traced it back to the time of the expulsion of the Jews from Spain following the Alhambra Decree in 1492, referring to Cartagena, Spain, founded by the Carthaginian, Hasdrubal the Fair.

== Career ==
He passed his matura exam in 1921, following which he enrolled at the University of Zurich to study medicine, graduating in 1924. In 1928, he obtained his PhD with his dissertation "On a case of cancer of the thyroid with peritheliomatous features".

Kartagener then worked as an assistant in Zurich at the Institute of Pathological Anatomy. Subsequently, he worked at the Children's Clinic and also at the Institute of Dermatology, Zurich, and then in Basel at the Institute of Physiological Chemistry. He received his internal medicine training at the Medical Polyclinic in Zurich, where Wilhelm Löffler was director, and with whom he worked as an assistant doctor for two years, and then as a senior doctor for eight years. With Löffler he published a paper on "The hydrogen ion concentration in faeces and its importance in acid-base balance". In 1938, Kartagener opened his own private practice. Kartagener was married to Roza, née Intrator.

Late in his life, Kartagener appears to have developed a polyneuropathic disorder which made him abandon his practice, and he died in Zurich in 1975.

== Contributions ==
Kartagener main concern was bronchiectasis, which was controversially attributed to either congenital or acquired causes. He opted for a congenital cause, having documented several cases of inherited situs inversus in association with it. Alfons Siewert, a Ukrainian physician, had already reported a similar case in 1904. Kartagener described the syndrome, the Kartagener syndrome, in 1933, as a triad of chronic sinusitis, bronchiectasis and situs inversus. This is now known as primary ciliary dyskinesia (the Siewert-Kartagener syndrome), and the situs inversus occurs in about half of the patients. He made further familial investigations afterwards, but never recognised the autosomal recessive inheritance or the presence of male infertility, which was added to the syndrome afterwards. It was Bjorn Afzelius, of Stockholm, who eventually traced the source of the pathology to a malfunction of cilia and flagella.

== Publications ==
- M. Kartagener: Das chronische Lungenilfiltrat mit Bluteosinophilie. In: Schweiz Med Wochenschr, 72, 1942, S. 862–864.
- M. Kartagener und F. Ramel: Über eine tödliche Trypaflavinvergiftung unter dem Bilde der nekrotisierenden Nephrose. In: Klinische Wochenschrift 11, 1932, S. 1273–1275. doi:10.1007/BF01758942.
- M. Kartagener: Kasuistischer Beitrag zur Frage der extrarenalen Azotämie. In: Klinische Wochenschrift 12, 1933, S. 1028–1029. doi:10.1007/BF01753622.
- M. Kartagener und P. Stucki: Bronchiectasis with situs inversus. In: Arch Pediatr. 79, 1962, S. 193–207. PMID 14454074.
- M. Kartagener: Hiatal hernia hemorrhage--a complication of anaesthesia. In: Schweiz Med Wochenschr 101, 1971, S. 427–428. PMID 5314790.
- M. Kartagener und K. Mully: Familial incidence of bronchiectasis. In: Schweiz Z Tuberk 13, 1956, S. 221–255. PMID 13390945.
- M. Kartagener und J. Wyler: Familial incidence of double malignancies. In: Schweiz Med Wochenschr 96, 1966, S. 218–219. PMID 4293169.
