= Situ =

Situ or situs may refer to:

== Latin ==
- In situ, Latin phrase meaning on-site or in-place
- Situs (law), a legal term meaning "site" where a law applies
- In biology, situs refers to the disposition of organs in organisms with left-right asymmetry
  - Situs solitus, the normal position of organs
  - Situs inversus, the inverted disposition of organs
  - Situs ambiguus (heterotaxia), comprises mixed cases where only some organs are inverted

== Chinese ==
- Situ (office), a high-ranking government position in ancient China
- Situ (surname), a surname derived from the office, also romanised Szeto, Seto, or Soohoo
- Situ language, spoken in Sichuan, China

== Tibetan ==
- Situ Panchen (1700–1774), 8th Tai Situ Rinpoche, an influential Tibetan
