= Sito =

Sito may refer to:

- SITO (artist collective)
- Sito (footballer, born 1980), real name Luis Castro Rodríguez, Spanish football defender
- Sito (footballer, born 1996), real name Andrés Pascual Santoja, Spanish football winger

People with the surname Sito include:

- Laura Sito (born 1991), Brazilian politician
- Luca Sito (born 2003), Italian athlete
- Sugi Sito (1926–2000), Mexican wrestler
- Tom Sito (born 1956), American animator

People with the nickname Sito include:

- Sito Pons (born 1959), Spanish motorcycle road racer
- Sito Alonso (born 1975), Spanish basketball coach
- Sito Riera (born 1987), Spanish football forward in Poland
- Sito Cruz (born 1988), Spanish football defender
- Sito Seoane (born 1989), American (soccer) football forward in Spain

== See also ==
- Seto (disambiguation)
- Situ (disambiguation)
