= Cold Hands, Warm Heart (novel) =

2009 young adult novel by Jill Wolfson

- First edition cover
- Author: Jill Wolfson
- Genre: Young adult novel
- Publisher: Henry Holt and Co.
- Publication date: March 31, 2009
- ISBN: 978-0-80508282-1

Cold Hands, Warm Heart is a young adult novel by Jill Wolfson. It was first published in 2009 by Henry Holt and Company. It addresses subjects like life-threatening illness, loss, and the gift of life through organ donation.

== Synopsis ==
Fifteen-year-old Dani has dextrocardia, a rare congenital condition in which her heart is situated on the right side of her chest, requiring constant medical monitoring. Meanwhile, fourteen-year-old Amanda is a competitive gymnast training for the national championship. One day, Amanda suffers a fatal accident while performing a gymnastics routine, and her heart is subsequently transplanted into Dani, saving her life.
