= Levocardia =

Typical heart position on the left side of the body

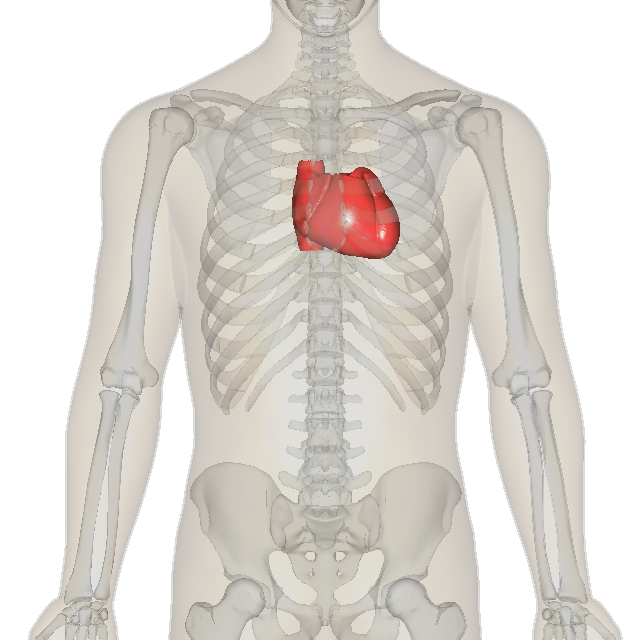
- Specialty: Cardiology

Levocardia refers to the most common location of the human heart, on the left side of the thoracic cavity. This is opposed to dextrocardia, in which the heart is in the right side. Neither levocardia nor dextrocardia is indicative of the orientation of the visceral organs, which can be in situs solitus, where the remainder of the organs are on normal side as well; or situs inversus, in which the viscera (stomach, liver, intestines, lungs, etc.) are on the opposite side as normal. The latter condition may or may not be associated with clinically relevant abnormalities.

== See also ==
- Isolated levocardia
