= CCDC40 =

Protein-coding gene in humans

Identifiers
- Aliases: CCDC40, CILD15, FAP172, coiled-coil domain containing 40, CFAP172
- External IDs: OMIM: 613799; MGI: 2443893; GeneCards: CCDC40

Gene location (Human)
Chr.	Chromosome 17 (human)
Band	17q25.3	Start	80,036,632 bp
Band	17q25.3	End	80,100,613 bp

Gene location (Mouse)
Chr.	Chromosome 11 (mouse)
Band	11|11 E2	Start	119,119,398 bp
Band	11|11 E2	End	119,156,064 bp
RNA expression pattern
Bgee	Human / Mouse (ortholog); Top expressed in: right uterine tube; bronchial epithelial cell; sural nerve; olfactory zone of nasal mucosa; left testis; tendon of biceps brachii; anterior pituitary; right testis; stromal cell of endometrium; left uterine tube / Top expressed in: choroidal fissure; seminiferous tubule; otolith organ; olfactory epithelium; utricle; spermatocyte; spermatid; choroid plexus of fourth ventricle; tail of embryo; genital tubercle; More reference expression data
BioGPS	n/a
Gene ontology
Molecular function	molecular function
Cellular component	cytoplasm; axoneme; cell projection; cilium; motile cilium; extracellular region
Biological process	heart looping; flagellated sperm motility; determination of digestive tract left/right asymmetry; epithelial cilium movement involved in extracellular fluid movement; determination of pancreatic left/right asymmetry; cilium movement; determination of liver left/right asymmetry; regulation of cilium beat frequency; motile cilium assembly; axonemal dynein complex assembly; lung development; inner dynein arm assembly; epithelial cilium movement involved in determination of left/right asymmetry; axoneme assembly; protein localization to cilium; cilium assembly
Sources:Amigo / QuickGO
Orthologs
Databases	NCBI: entry; OMA: entry
Species	Human	Mouse
Entrez	55036	207607
Ensembl	ENSG00000141519	ENSMUSG00000039963
UniProt	Q4G0X9	Q8BI79
RefSeq (mRNA)	NM_001243342; NM_017950; NM_001330508	NM_175430; NM_001364767
RefSeq (protein)	NP_001230271; NP_001317437; NP_060420	NP_780639; NP_001351696
Location (UCSC)	Chr 17: 80.04 – 80.1 Mb	Chr 11: 119.12 – 119.16 Mb
PubMed search
- Wikidata
View/Edit Human	View/Edit Mouse

CCDC40 is the gene in humans that encodes the protein named coiled-coil domain containing 40.

== Function ==
This gene encodes a protein that is necessary for motile cilia function. It functions in correct left-right axis formation by regulating the assembly of the inner dynein arm and the dynein regulatory complexes, which control ciliary beat. Mutations in this gene cause primary ciliary dyskinesia type 15, a disorder due to defects in cilia motility. Alternative splicing results in multiple transcript variants. [provided by RefSeq, Aug 2011].
