= Primary ciliary dyskinesia =

- Other names: Immotile ciliary syndrome or Kartagener syndrome
- Normal cilia (A) and cilia representative of Kartagener's syndrome (B)
- Specialty: Pulmonology
- Symptoms: Respiratory problems, chronic mucus-producing cough and runny nose.
- Complications: Chronic recurrent respiratory infections, including sinusitis, bronchitis, pneumonia, and otitis media.
- Usual onset: Neonatal period.
- Types: Kartagener syndrome.
- Causes: Genetic mutations.
- Diagnostic method: Nasal nitric oxide levels, light microscopy of biopsies for ciliary beat pattern and frequency, and electron microscopic examination of dynein arms.
- Differential diagnosis: Neonatal respiratory distress, laterality defects, chronic cough, nasal congestion and sino-pulmonary disease, cystic fibrosis, asthma and allergic rhinitis, gastroesophageal reflux disease and aspiration, immunodeficiency, and interstitial lung disease.
- Frequency: Rare.

Primary ciliary dyskinesia (PCD) is a rare, autosomal recessive genetic ciliopathy, that causes defects in the action of cilia lining the upper and lower respiratory tract, sinuses, Eustachian tube, middle ear, fallopian tube, and flagella of sperm cells. The alternative name of "immotile ciliary syndrome" is no longer favored as the cilia do have movement, but are merely inefficient or unsynchronized. When accompanied by situs inversus the condition is known as Kartagener syndrome.

Respiratory epithelial motile cilia, which resemble microscopic "hairs" (although structurally and biologically unrelated to hair), are complex organelles that beat synchronously in the respiratory tract, moving mucus toward the throat. Normally, cilia beat 7 to 22 times per second, and any impairment can result in poor mucociliary clearance, with subsequent upper and lower respiratory infection. Cilia also are involved in other biological processes (such as nitric oxide production), currently the subject of dozens of research efforts.

== Signs and symptoms ==
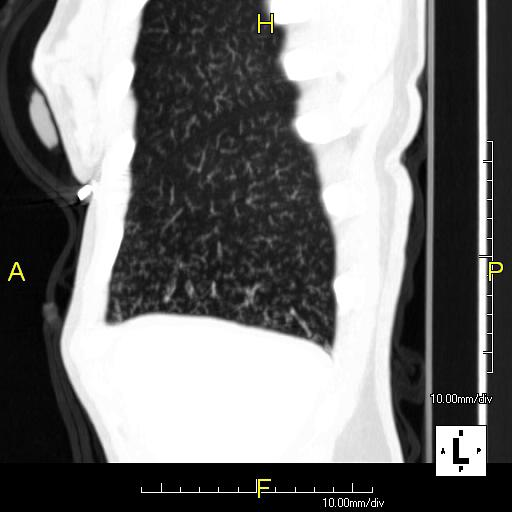
Sagittal CT image showing "tree in bud" appearance of mucous impaction in distal small airways related to primary ciliary dyskinesia

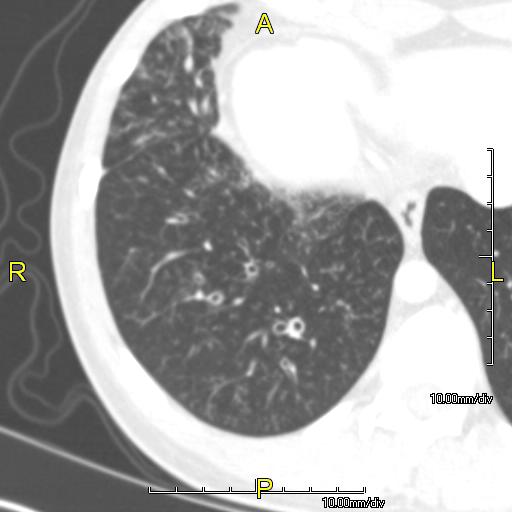
CT image showing dilated and thickened medium-sized airways (bronchiectasis) in a patient with Kartagener syndrome

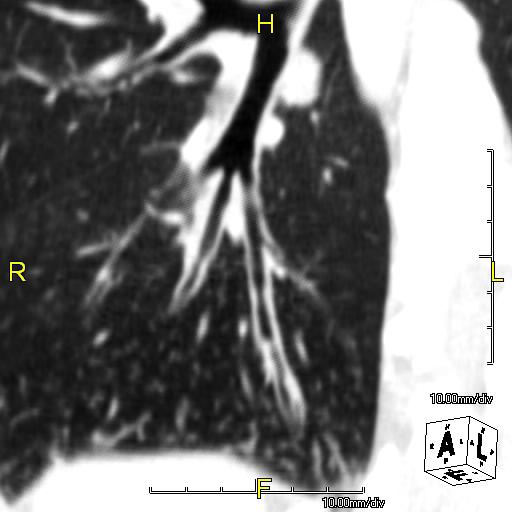
Oblique sagittal CT image showing lower lobe cylindrical bronchiectasis in the same patient

Around 80% of people with primary ciliary dyskinesia experience respiratory problems beginning within a day of birth. Many have a collapsed lobe of the lung and blood oxygen low enough to require treatment with supplemental oxygen. Within the first few months of life, most develop a chronic mucus-producing cough and runny nose. The main consequence of impaired ciliary function is reduced or absent mucus clearance from the lungs, and susceptibility to chronic recurrent respiratory infections, including sinusitis, bronchitis, pneumonia, and otitis media. Progressive damage to the respiratory system is common, including progressive bronchiectasis beginning in early childhood, and sinus disease (sometimes becoming severe in adults). However, diagnosis is often missed early in life despite the characteristic signs and symptoms. In males, immotility of sperm can lead to infertility, although conception remains possible through the use of in vitro fertilization; there also are reported cases where sperm were able to move. Trials have also shown that there is a marked reduction in fertility in females with Kartagener's syndrome due to dysfunction of the oviductal cilia.

Many affected individuals experience hearing loss and show symptoms of otitis media which demonstrates variable responsiveness to the insertion of myringotomy tubes or grommets. Some patients have a poor sense of smell, which is believed to accompany high mucus production in the sinuses (although others report normal – or even acute – sensitivity to smell and taste). Clinical progression of the disease is variable, with lung transplantation required in severe cases. Susceptibility to infections can be drastically reduced by an early diagnosis. Treatment with various chest physiotherapy techniques has been observed to reduce the incidence of lung infection and to slow the progression of bronchiectasis dramatically. Aggressive treatment of sinus disease beginning at an early age is believed to slow long-term sinus damage (although this has not yet been adequately documented). Aggressive measures to enhance clearance of mucus, prevent respiratory infections, and treat bacterial superinfections have been observed to slow lung-disease progression. The predicted incidence is 1 in approximately 7500.

== Genetics ==
PCD is a genetically heterogeneous disorder affecting motile cilia which are made up of approximately 250 proteins. Around 90% of individuals with PCD have ultrastructural defects affecting protein(s) in the outer and/or inner dynein arms, which give cilia their motility, with roughly 38% of these defects caused by mutations on two genes, DNAI1 and DNAH5, both of which code for proteins found in the ciliary outer dynein arm.

There is an international effort to identify genes that code for inner dynein arm proteins or proteins from other ciliary structures (radial spokes, central apparatus, etc.) associated with PCD. The role of DNAH5 in heterotaxy syndromes and left-right asymmetry is also under investigation. At least 50 genes have been implicated in this condition.

Type	OMIM	Gene	Locus
CILD1	244400	DNAI1	9p21-p13
CILD2	606763	DNAAF3	19q13.3-qter
CILD3	608644	DNAH5	5p
CILD4	608646	?	15q13
CILD5	608647	HYDIN	16p12
CILD6	610852	TXNDC3	7p14-p13
CILD7	611884	DNAH11	7p21
CILD8	612274	?	15q24-q25
CILD9	612444	DNAI2	17q25
CILD10	612518	KTU	14q21.3
CILD11	612649	RSPH4A	6q22
CILD12	612650	RSPH9	6p21
CILD13	613190	LRRC50	16q24.1

Another gene associated with this condition is GAS2L2.

== Pathophysiology ==
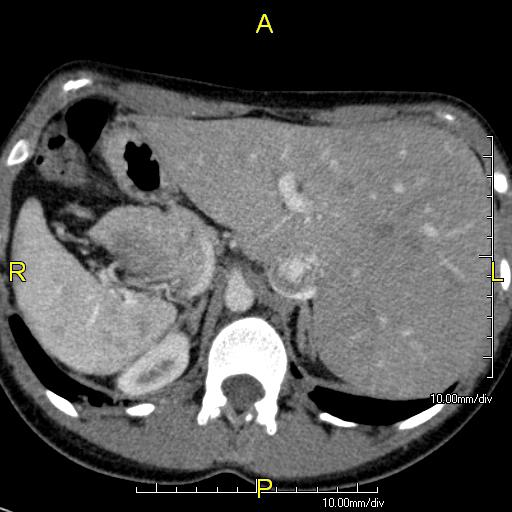
CT image showing situs inversus. The liver is normally on the right side of the body and the spleen on the left, they are switched in this patient with situs inversus.

This condition is genetically inherited. Structures that make up the cilia, including inner and/or outer dynein arms, central apparatus, radial spokes, etc. are missing or dysfunctional and thus the axoneme structure lacks the ability to move. Axonemes are the elongated structures that make up cilia and flagella. Additionally, there may be chemical defects that interfere with ciliary function in the presence of adequate structure. Whatever the underlying cause, dysfunction of the cilia begins during and impacts the embryologic phase of development.

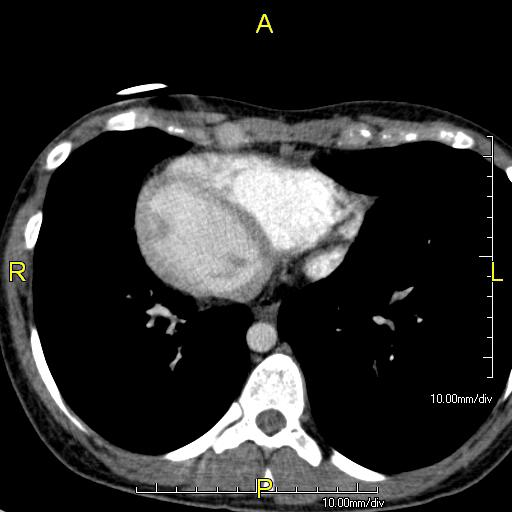
Axial CT image showing dextrocardia with the IVC and morphologic right ventricle on the left and the left ventricle on the right

Specialised monocilia known as nodal cilia are at the heart of this problem. They lack the central-pair microtubules of ordinary motile cilia and so rotate clockwise rather than beat; in the primitive node at the anterior end of the primitive streak in the embryo, these are angled posteriorly such that they describe a D-shape rather than a circle. This has been shown to generate a net leftward flow in mouse and chick embryos, and sweeps the protein to the left, triggering normal asymmetrical development.

However, in some individuals with PCD, mutations thought to be in the gene coding for the key structural protein left-right dynein (lrd) result in monocilia which do not rotate. There is therefore no flow generated in the node, Shh moves at random within it, and 50% of those affected develop situs inversus, which can occur with or without dextrocardia, where the laterality of the internal organs is the mirror-image of normal. Affected individuals therefore have Kartagener syndrome. This is not the case with some PCD-related genetic mutations: at least 6% of the PCD population have a condition called situs ambiguus or heterotaxy, where organ placement or development is neither typical (situs solitus) nor totally reversed (situs inversus totalis) but is a hybrid of the two. Splenic abnormalities such as polysplenia, asplenia and complex congenital heart defects are more common in individuals with situs ambiguus and PCD, as they are in all individuals with situs ambiguus.

The genetic forces linking failure of nodal cilia and situs issues and the relationship of those forces to PCD are the subject of intense research interest. However, knowledge in this area is constantly advancing.

== Diagnosis ==
Several diagnostic tests for this condition have been proposed. These include nasal nitric oxide levels as a screening test, light microscopy of biopsies for ciliary beat pattern and frequency and electron microscopic examination of dynein arms, as the definite diagnosis method. Genetic testing has also been proposed but this is difficult given that there are multiple genes involved.

=== Classification ===
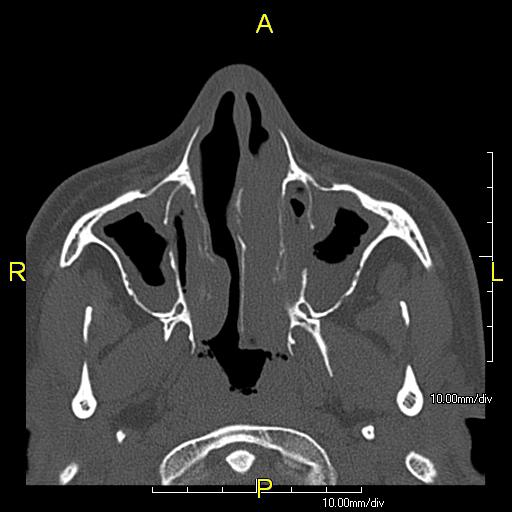
Axial CT image showing chronic sinusitis in an individual with Kartagener syndrome

When accompanied by the combination of situs inversus (reversal of the internal organs), chronic sinusitis, and bronchiectasis, it is known as Kartagener syndrome (only 50% of primary ciliary dyskinesia cases include situs inversus).

== Treatment ==
There are no standardized effective treatment strategies for the condition. Current therapies for PCD are extrapolated from Cystic Fibrosis and patients with non-CF bronchiectasis and lack validation for PCD-specific use.

Severe fatal respiratory failure can develop; long-term treatment with macrolides such as clarithromycin, erythromycin and azithromycin has been empirically applied for the treatment of primary ciliary dyskinesia in Japan, though controversial due to the effects of the medications.

== Prognosis ==
There is no reliable estimate of life expectancy for people with PCD. However, there is evidence that PCD, is a life altering life shortening multi-system condition, with some people progressing to lung transplant.

Decline in lung function in people with PCD has been observed in most studies, with FEV1 decline causing deterioration in health, impacting on, and reducing quality of life. With such a genetically and phenotypically heterogenous group, observation of median/mean decline in lung function risks regression to the mean, missing those groups with significantly worse lung function, masked by those with milder phenotypes.

The recent body of published data from respected clinicians in (the United Kingdom, Europe, North America, Canada and Israel) indicate that PCD morbidity and mortality appear to have been under-estimated by the medical community. While prospective outcome data is limited due to the early-stage patient registries, there is a growing body of evidence that dispels any "myth that PCD is a mild disease.

The studies presented here demonstrate that children with PCD typically have similar or worse lung function than those with cystic fibrosis. While previously it was thought that with early diagnosis, deterioration of lung function could largely be prevented in children with PCD, poor lung function is repeatedly observed in children with PCD ^{1,30,32,33,36–38} and some develop bronchiectasis during childhood.

== Research ==
Research to further the understanding of cilia, with the future aims of functional restoration of motile cilia is advancing. However, charitable funding for medical research, particularly for rare disease is vital and in the UK contributes to more than 50% of grants. The UK registered charity PCD Research supports research into PCD worldwide, with the ultimate aim of funding potentially curative research. Future promising avenues for functional replacement of cilia involve antisense, gene editing via CRISPR-Cas9 and mRNA therapies. At present there have only been a handful of interventional trials in PCD.

== History ==
The classic symptom combination associated with PCD was first described in 1904 by A. K. Siewert, while Manes Kartagener published his first report on the subject in 1933. The disorder is rarely referred to as Siewert's syndrome or Siewert-Kartagener syndrome.
