= Polysplenia =

Developmental failure in spleen formation

- Other names: Bilateral left-sidedness, left isomerism
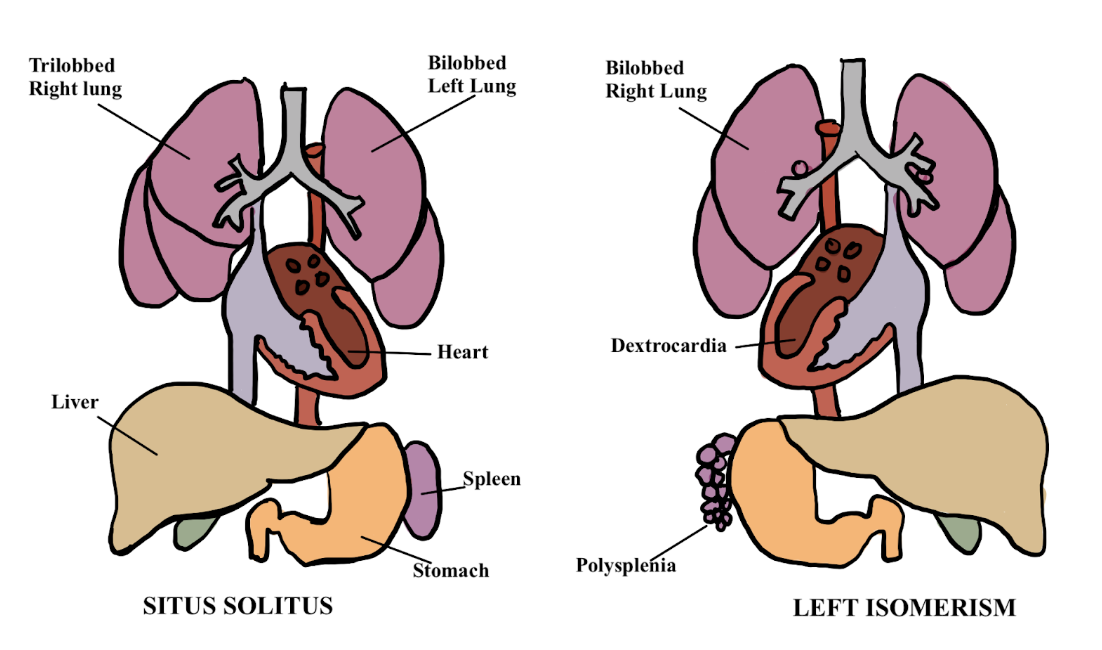
- Normal arrangement of organs (left) and polysplenia (right)
- Specialty: Medical genetics

Polysplenia is a congenital disease manifested by multiple small accessory spleens, rather than a single, full-sized, normal spleen. Polysplenia sometimes occurs alone, but it is often accompanied by other developmental abnormalities. Conditions associated with polysplenia include gastrointestinal abnormalities, such as intestinal malrotation or biliary atresia, as well as cardiac abnormalities, such as dextrocardia. This condition occurs in 1 per 250,000 live births, with 75% of patients with polysplenia dying before the age of 5 and approximately 10% of patients making it to mid-adolescence. Polysplenia occurs very rarely in adults and the elderly, because of the common association of the disorder to congenital heart defects which usually prevents those affected from reaching adulthood. Polysplenia affects more females than males.

== History ==
In 1929, E.B. Helwig was the first to describe heterotaxy syndrome, which is a form of polysplenia.

== Signs and symptoms ==
Polysplenia syndrome is a bilateral left-sidedness, or "left isomerism", with bilateral bilobed lungs, bilateral pulmonary atria and abnormal location of abdominal organs associated with multiple spleens. The term "left isomerism" encompasses all variations of organs on the right side of the body that develop morphological features of their left side counterparts.

The form of the spleen itself in polysplenia syndrome varies; it may consist of multiple small splenic masses which together equate to the mass of a normal spleen, or an undivided but multi-lobular spleen associated with multiple tiny accessory spleens. A typical adult spleen ranges from 6 to 13 cm (2.4 to 5.1 in) in size, and 75–125 g (2.6–4.4 oz) in weight. For patients with polysplenia, the splenic mass is often divided into fairly equally sized masses ranging from 1 to 6 cm (0.4 to 2.4 in) in diameter in adults. Occasional patients show a normal-appearing spleen and 3 or more accessory spleens. The number of spleens varies by a large margin, ranging from 2 to 16 spleens. A single bilobed spleen is a rare variant.

Most patients with polysplenia are diagnosed during childhood due to the frequent associations with early-detectable cardiac abnormalities. In adults, polysplenia is typically incidentally diagnosed on medical imaging examinations while looking for other causes.

== Associated conditions ==
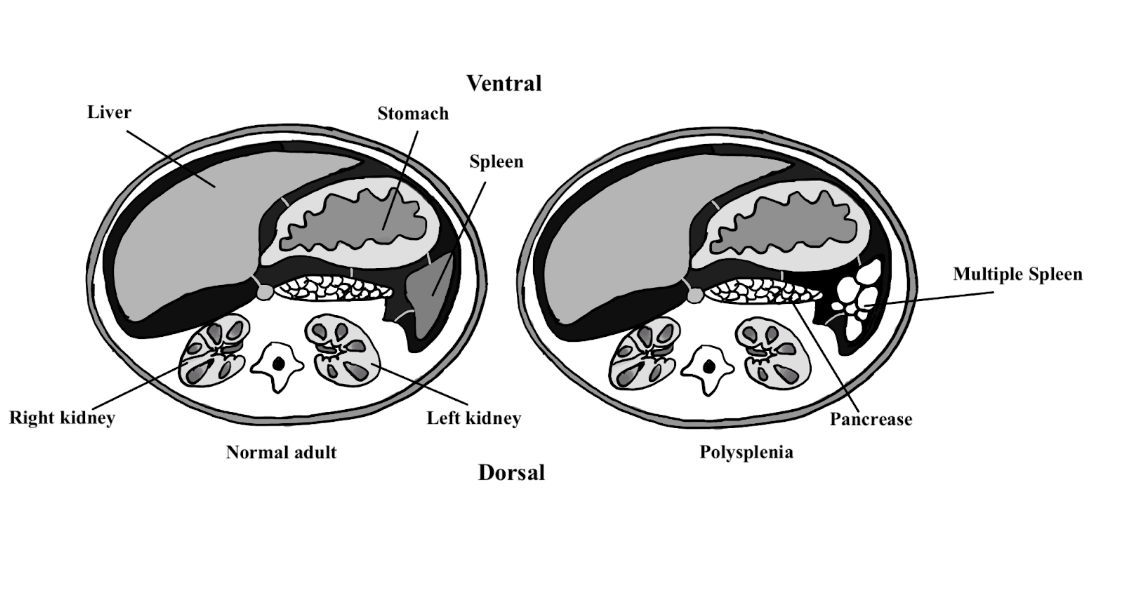
CT scan view of a normal adult body (left) compared to polysplenia (right)

A convoluted list of terms is used to refer to polysplenia; heterotaxy, situs ambiguous or left isomerism are often used as synonyms. There are frequent associated congenital anomalies all related to deviations in the development of anatomical asymmetries in early embryonic stages. These conditions considered together are called "polysplenia syndrome".

Patients with polysplenia syndrome have an increased risk of splenic infarction, a rare but serious complication that occurs due to occlusion of the splenic artery, leading to blocked blood flow and subsequent ischemia and necrosis of splenic tissue. Those with polysplenia syndrome are more at risk for splenic infarction due to their abnormal vasculature at the spleen and increased number of accessory spleens.

Conditions more commonly found in pediatric patients with polysplenia are bilateral two-lobed lungs with hyparterial bronchi, abdominal heterotaxia with bowel malrotation, and interruption of the inferior vena cava with azygos continuation. Inferior vena cava interruption with azygos continuation is the second most commonly seen anomaly, following multiple spleens in polysplenia syndrome.

Cardiac malformations include dextrocardia, a condition where the heart is situated on the right side instead of the left, atrial situs ambiguus, in which the visceral organs are randomly arranged, and ventricular inversion, where the left and right ventricles have their positions swapped. Other cardiac malformations include an inferior vena cava interrupted with azygous continuation, and ventriculoarterial concordance with a left posterior aorta.

Anemia, a condition characterized by a low red blood cell count, can also manifest in individuals with polysplenia due to spleen dysfunction.

Frequent variations in the great veins are observed as well. The superior vena cava can be bilateral, meaning both right and left superior vena cava are present instead of the normal disappearance of the left superior vena cava during development, may terminate in the coronary sinus, or, less commonly, can connect directly to the left atrium instead of the right. The coronary sinus itself may be absent, a finding often associated with the persistence of a left-sided superior vena cava. The inferior vena cava is frequently interrupted, with venous return continuing through the azygos system instead of continuing to the heart as usual. Atrial septal defects, particularly of the endocardial cushion type, can also occur in some cases.

Pulmonary findings in polysplenia reflect left isomerism, where both lungs display morphological characteristics of the left lung—each with two lobes instead of the normal three-lobed right lung and two-lobed left lung, and bilateral hyparterial bronchi. Gastrointestinal anomalies are also frequent and include abdominal heterotaxia characterized by abnormal positioning of the abdominal organs, malrotation or nonrotation of the midgut, and abnormally positioned stomach and liver, for instance, a right-sided stomach and a midline or left-sided liver. Other associated abdominal abnormalities may involve the pancreas, duodenum, and vascular structures, with findings such as a short pancreas or venous anomalies.

Other frequently associated malformations include situs inversus, the positional inversion of major organs, biliary atresia characterized by missing or blocked bile ducts, vascular, pancreatic, duodenal and lung lobe number abnormalities. Although present, the multiple small spleens are often ineffective; this is termed functional asplenia.

All of these conditions, in which one or several organs have developed in the wrong positions (the organs may be underdeveloped or have proper functioning development), are described under a general term called heterotaxy syndrome. Hence, polysplenia itself is a heterotaxy and has other associated heterotaxy syndromes.

Major types

There are four main types of polysplenia. Isolated polysplenia refers to the presence of multiple spleens, with no other malformations present. Polysplenia syndrome encompasses multiple organ abnormalities, also referred to as heterotaxy syndrome. Bilateral right-sidedness is characterized by the stomach being on the right side of the body, and 3 lobes on both lungs instead of the normal 3-lobed right lung and 2-lobed left lung. Asplenia with polysplenia syndrome is rare, describing the coexistence of asplenia and polysplenia.

=== Proposed causes ===
Polysplenia and most of its associated conditions are congenital conditions, and are believed to be caused by developmental disruptions in the embryo. It is hypothesized that polysplenia arises from the acceleration of embryonic body curvature changes. The organ developmental stages related to polyspenia, such as spleen formation, separation of aorta and pulmonary artery into two separate outflow track (septation of the conotruncus), formation of the three lobes of the lungs (lobulation of the lung) and gut rotation, all occur by the 36th day of gestation. Hence, it is thought that these heterotaxy syndromes are all different forms of the same embryonic developmental abnormality caused by a teratogenic insult during the 31st to 36th days of gestation.

=== Potential relevant genes ===
The molecular genetics of polysplenia syndrome are not well understood. Many genes that encode proteins of the TGF-β, transforming growth factor beta, pathway are considered candidates for left-sided or right-sided isomerism. Two secreted ligands of the TFG-β superfamily amplify the expression of PITX2 transcription factor, a key determinant of left identity. The CFC1 gene, which encodes a component of the multi-subunit receptor NODAL, is a candidate of particular interest for broad-spectrum phenotypic changes such as polysplenia and associated abnormalities in the cardiac system and lungs. Loss of function experiments show that the CFC1 gene product, the Cryptic protein, and NODAL signalling are necessary for left-right axis formation.

=== Inheritance ===
A specific inheritance pattern for polysplenia has not been established. Some studies state that it is possibly inherited with an autosomal recessive pattern while other studies had data that could not confirm such inheritance. One study of a sibling with polysplenia reported autosomal dominant inheritance and another on two first cousins suggested autosomal dominant inheritance with incomplete penetrance.

=== Diagnosis ===
Asplenia and polysplenia are difficult to diagnose using ultrasound since the structure of the spleen itself is hard to visualize due to its anatomical location. The wide-ranging clinical presentation of polysplenia poses additional diagnostic challenges. Detection of the typically associated condition, inferior vena cava interruption with azygos continuation using ultrasound, is used as a reliable method of diagnosing polysplenia. This method can be used in newborns and in the fetus in utero.

Other methods of observing the spleen are CT scans and MRI. Blood tests and echocardiography can also be done to detect related blood cell and heart abnormalities.

=== Management ===
The treatment depends on the patient's age and their specific symptoms and conditions. Those with polysplenia in childhood often require surgery to address the associated cardiac anomalies and remove spleens to prevent future complications such as splenic infarction.

If fetal diagnosis shows an extreme case of polyspenia where the chances of survival are very low, then abortion can be offered.

=== Adult cases ===
It is possible to have polysplenia without severe congenital cardiac abnormalities, which is the case for 5–10% of polysplenia patients; this scenario often leads to diagnosis later in adulthood. Individuals with polysplenia in adulthood can live a normal life, with symptomatic management and awareness from the patient and doctors. Advancements in ultrasound and CT imaging have improved characterization of polysplenia, helping in diagnosis and therapeutic management of patients. Management of polysplenia depends on the type of deformation, and generally no specific treatment is given.

One case reported the rare association of polysplenia with pulmonary agenesis, where the upper and middle lobes of the lungs had failed to develop properly. The male patient from Saudi Arabia showed to have dextrocardia after a chest x-ray was performed, and further tests with computed tomography showed an underdeveloped right lung, which only had the lower lobe, while the upper and middle lobes were not present. Despite having a malformed right lung alongside polysplenia, all functions of the lung and heart were normal, and no other functional abnormalities were seen; therefore, the patient did not require long-term treatment.

In another adult case, a 60-year-old male patient came in for an acute left renal colic and CT-scan performed found multiple spleen and other abnormalities associated with polysplenia like azygous continuity of inferior vena cava, partial development of dorsal pancreas, and hepatic veins from the liver sending blood directly into the right atrium instead of draining into the inferior vena cava which takes the blood to the right atrium in normal conditions. These abnormalities caused no perturbation in his life. The patient was diagnosed with left ureteral calculi, which means that a kidney stone was present in the left ureter, causing the initial pain. Treatment for the left ureteral calculi was provided, and no treatment for the polysplenia was required; the patient was only made aware of its existence.

== See also ==
- Splenosis
