= Asplenia with cardiovascular anomalies =

- Other names: Ivemark syndrome
- This condition is inherited in an autosomal recessive manner
- Specialty: Medical genetics

Asplenia with cardiovascular anomalies, also known as Ivemark syndrome and right atrial isomerism, is an example of a heterotaxy syndrome. These uncommon congenital disorders are characterized by defects in the heart, spleen and paired organs such as the lungs and kidneys. Another name is "asplenia-cardiovascular defect-heterotaxy".

Right atrial isomerism is named for its discoverer, Swedish pathologist Biörn Ivemark.

== Presentation ==
In right atrial isomerism, both atria of the heart are morphological right atria leading to associated abnormalities in the pulmonary venous system. In addition, individuals with right atrial isomerism develop asplenia, a midline liver, malrotation of the small intestine and the presence of two morphologic right lungs. Individuals with left atrial isomerism, by comparison, have two morphologic left atria, polysplenia, intestinal malrotation and two morphologic left lungs.

== Causes ==
The cause of heterotaxy is unknown.

The Ivemark Syndrome Association, which is based in Dorset, is one of the organisations dedicated to helping patients and funding research.
