= ODAD3 =

Protein-coding gene in humans

Identifiers
- Aliases: ODAD3, CILD30, coiled-coil domain containing 151, ODA10, CCDC151, outer dynein arm docking complex subunit 3
- External IDs: OMIM: 615956; MGI: 1924859; GeneCards: ODAD3

Gene location (Human)
Chr.	Chromosome 19 (human)
Band	19p13.2	Start	11,420,604 bp
Band	19p13.2	End	11,435,782 bp

Gene location (Mouse)
Chr.	Chromosome 9 (mouse)
Band	9|9 A3	Start	21,901,167 bp
Band	9|9 A3	End	21,913,930 bp
RNA expression pattern
Bgee	Human / Mouse (ortholog); Top expressed in: bronchial epithelial cell; right uterine tube; gonad; nasal epithelium; mucosa of paranasal sinus; olfactory zone of nasal mucosa; testicle; left testis; right testis; pituitary gland / Top expressed in: seminiferous tubule; otolith organ; utricle; spermatocyte; morula; spermatid; olfactory epithelium; Epithelium of choroid plexus; embryo; embryo; More reference expression data
BioGPS	n/a
Gene ontology
Molecular function	protein binding
Cellular component	cytoplasm; ciliary basal body; centriole; axoneme; cell projection; cilium; cytoskeleton
Biological process	regulation of cilium assembly; determination of left/right symmetry; outer dynein arm assembly; cell projection organization; axonemal dynein complex assembly; cilium movement
Sources:Amigo / QuickGO
Orthologs
Databases	NCBI: entry; OMA: entry
Species	Human	Mouse
Entrez	115948	77609
Ensembl	ENSG00000198003	ENSMUSG00000039632
UniProt	A5D8V7	Q8BSN3
RefSeq (mRNA)	NM_145045; NM_001302453; NM_001302454	NM_001163787; NM_029939
RefSeq (protein)	NP_001289382; NP_001289383; NP_659482	NP_001157259; NP_084215
Location (UCSC)	Chr 19: 11.42 – 11.44 Mb	Chr 9: 21.9 – 21.91 Mb
PubMed search
- Wikidata
View/Edit Human	View/Edit Mouse

Outer dynein arm-docking complex subunit 3 is a protein that in humans is encoded by the ODAD3 gene (previously CCDC151). As its name suggests, ODAD3 is part of a protein complex called the "dynein arm-docking complex" (ODA-DC), which is involved in outer dynein arm assembly.

== Clinical significance ==
Mutations in the gene ODAD3 are associated with Primary ciliary dyskinesia.
