= Left-right asymmetry =

Early process which breaks bilateral symmetry during embryonic development

In developmental biology, left–right asymmetry (LR asymmetry) is the process in early embryonic development that breaks the normal symmetry in the bilateral embryo. In vertebrates, left–right asymmetry is established early in development at a structure called the left–right organizer (the name of which varies between species) and leads to activation of different signalling pathways on the left and right of the embryo. This in turn causes several organs in adults to develop LR asymmetry, such as the tilt of the heart, the different number of lung lobes on each side of the body, and the position of the stomach and spleen on the right side of the body. If this process does not occur correctly in humans it can result in heterotaxy or situs inversus.

LR asymmetry is pervasive throughout all animals, including invertebrates. Examples of invertebrate LR asymmetry include the large and small claws of the fiddler crab, asymmetrical gut coiling in Drosophila melanogaster, and dextral (clockwise) and sinistral (counterclockwise) coiling of gastropods. This asymmetry can be restricted to a specific organ or feature, as in the crab claws, or be expressed throughout the entire body as in snails.

== Developmental basis ==
Different species have evolved different mechanisms of LR patterning. For example, cilia are critical for LR patterning in many vertebrate species such as humans, rodents, fish and frog, but other species, such as reptiles, birds and pigs develop LR asymmetry without cilia.

=== Cilia dependent vertebrates ===
The name of the LR organizer varies between species, and thus includes the node in mice, the gastrocoel roof plate in frog and Kupffer's vesicle in zebrafish. In each case the LR organizer is found on the dorsal side of the embryo and each organizer cell has a single cilium located on the posterior side of the cell. The combination of location of cells of the dorsal surface combined with the posterior location of the cilia means that when the cilia rotate it creates a left-ward flow across the surface of the organizer. The flow causes loss of Cerl2 and increased Nodal expression on the left side of the organizer, although there is some debate whether this occurs due to a chemical/protein signal or due to the cells physically sensing the flow. In either case, the signal is then transferred to the left Lateral plate mesoderm where it activates a further signalling cascade of genes including Nodal, Pitx2 and Lefty2.

=== Cilia independent vertebrates ===
In chickens, LR asymmetry is established at a structure called Hensen's node. Unlike most other vertebrates, this process is not thought to involve cilia as (i) Hensen's node does not have motile cilia and (ii) unlike other species, mutations that affect cilia formation do not cause laterality defects in chicken. Instead, chickens establish LR asymmetry through asymmetric cell rearrangements which results in a leftward movement of cells near the Hensen's node.

Another study has found that pigs do not have cilia within their left right organizer, suggesting pigs also have an alternative cilia independent mechanism for establishing LR asymmetry.

=== Non-vertebrate deuterostomes ===
Recently, work has shown that the Nodal–Pitx2 pathway is present and functional in the non-vertebrate deuterostomes (tunicates, sea urchins). In tunicate (ascidian) Ciona intestinalis and Halocynthia roretzi, Nodal is expressed on the left side of the developing embryo and leads to downstream expression of Pitx2. At earlier stages, similar H+/K+ ATPase ion channels are reported to be necessary for correct left–right patterning. While the role of cilia here is still unclear, one study observes that large-scale embryonic movements are required for left–right determination in H. roretzi, and that this movement is possibly achieved through ciliary movements.

In the sea urchin, Nodal is expressed on the right side of the embryo, in contrast to the tunicate and vertebrate condition on the left side. Because protostomes appear to also express Nodal on their right side instead of the left (discussed below), some have suggested that this lends further evidence for the dorsoventral inversion hypothesis.

=== Protostomes ===
==== Ecdysozoa ====
While D. melanogaster and nematode Caenorhabditis elegans do show left–right asymmetry, the Nodal signaling pathway itself is absent in Ecdysozoa. Instead, cytoskeletal regulators such as Myo31DF, a type ID unconventional myosin, have been found to control left–right asymmetry in organ systems such as genitalia.

==== Lophotrochozoa ====
Unlike in Ecdysozoa, the Nodal–Pitx2 pathways have been identified in many lineages within the Lophotrochozoans. When found in brachiopods and molluscs, these genes are asymmetrically expressed on the right. Platyhelminthes, annelids, and nermeteans lack a Nodal orthologue and instead only express Pitx2, which was expressed in association to the nervous system.

== Whole body left–right asymmetry in gastropods ==
Whole body inversion is observed as chiral (dextral, sinistral) coiling in gastropods. While dextral coiling is the most common as it appears in 90-99% of living species, sinistral species still have arisen many times.

=== Developmental basis of shell coiling ===
Gastropods undergo spiral cleavage, a feature commonly seen in lophotrochozoans. As the embryo divides, quartets of cells are oriented at angles to each other. In the snail Lymnaea stagnalis, the direction of rotation during the first cell division signals whether the adult will show dextral or sinistral coiling, At the third cleavage (8-cell stage), spindles in dextral snails are inclined clockwise whereas they are counterclockwise in sinistral snails. Furthermore, injecting L. peregra sinistral eggs with the cytoplasm of dextral eggs before the second polar body formation will reverse the polarity of the sinistral embryos. These data show that chirality is heritable and maternally deposited in Lymnaea.

Several studies have begun to investigate the molecular basis of this inheritance. Nodal and Pitx2 are expressed on different sides of the L. stagnalis embryo depending on its chirality – right for dextral, left for sinistral. Downstream of Nodal, decapentaplegic (dpp), shows the same expression pattern. In limpets (gastropods without coiled shells) dpp is expressed symmetrically in Patella vulgata and Nipponacmea fuscoviridis. Additionally, in N. fuscoviridis, dpp has been shown to drive cell proliferation

Upstream of Nodal, Lsdia1/2 have been implicated in controlling L. stagnalis chirality. Davison et al. (2016) mapped the "chirality locus" to a 0.4 Mb region and determined that Lsdia2 is the likely candidate for determining dextral or sinistral coiling. This is a diaphanous-related formin gene involved in cytoskeleton formation. Dextral embryos treated with drugs that inhibited formin activity phenocopied the sinistral condition. Concurrent work from Kuroda et al. (2016) identified the same Lsdia2 gene (called Lsdia1 in their study) but failed to reproduce the formin inhibition results in the Davison et al. study. Additionally, Kuroda et al. (2016) did not find asymmetrically expressed Lsdia2 as was seen in the Davison et al. (2016) study.

== See also ==
- Fluctuating asymmetry
- Symmetry breaking and cortical rotation
