= Alfons Siewert =

Ukrainian doctor

Alfons Karlovich Siewert
- Born: 1872
- Died: 1922 (aged 49–50)
- Occupation: Physician
- Known for: Siewert-Kartagener syndrome (Primary ciliary dyskinesia)
- Children: 2 sons (Vladimir and Georgiy), 1 daughter (Maria)

Alfons Karlovich Siewert (1872–1922), also called Alfons Karlovich Zivert or Alfonse-Ferdinand-Julius-Zivert, was a Ukrainian physician, who hailed from a German family closely allied to the Tsar and Imperial Russia. He is known for his eponymous contribution to the Siewert-Kartagener syndrome (Primary ciliary dyskinesia).

== Early life ==
Siewert's father was born in Białystok, Poland. After working in various places in postal services, he eventually became a chief in the 'Black Cabinet' of Kyiv, dealing in censorship and intelligence. In 1907. he and his family were granted noble status by the Tsar. He married Johanna Dreyer, who bore four sons and two daughters, the eldest of which was Alfons. One of his brothers, Erich, followed in his father's footsteps. Alfons chose to enter into a medical career, and after gaining his qualifications, worked throughout his life at his alma mater, the Saint Vladimir University of Kiev (now National Taras Shevchenko University of Kyiv).

== Marriage ==
Siewert married the daughter of a well-known Russian musician V.V.Puholsky. They had 2 sons, Vladimir and Georgiy, and a daughter, Maria. The elder son Vladimir was a monarchist, and opposed Bolshevism throughout his life. Arrested by the Cheka in 1919, he was re-arrested in 1929 and exiled to Siberia in 1932. Released again some years later, he was once again imprisoned for belonging to a Tsarist and fascist organisation. He was sentenced to death and shot in 1938.

== Contributions ==
He was the first person to report a case of bronchiectasis with situs inversus, in 1904, although he reported it in a Russian publication some two years before then. His 1904 report of the case, and Kartagener's report of several cases in 1933, is now known as the Siewert-Kartagener syndrome. Later, the syndrome included male infertility. Its characterisation as a primary ciliary dyskinesia was not made until after the advent of TEM, by Azfelius in 1976 when he showed it to be a disorder of motility of cilia and flagella, This would exclude primary cilia (nodal) which are thought to be implicated in the anomaly of the situs inversus part of the syndrome.

Siewert's main interests were in cardiovascular medicine and toxicology. Early research work was on the effect of various alcohols and toxins on the heart and the circulation. In 1904, he published a paper on the manometric measurements of the isolated mammalian heart. Strophanthin, also known as ouabain, an ancient arrow poison used in eastern Africa, had attracted the attentions of European pharmacologists at the end of the nineteenth century. In 1882, ouabain was isolated from the plant by the French chemist Léon-Albert Arnaud and identified as a cardiac glycoside. Siewert studied the effects of the glycoside on the heart and blood pressure. He also conducted studies on the biochemical changes in urine as a result of eating meat in 1912, and on diastole in 1922
