= DNAI1 =

Protein-coding gene in the species Homo sapiens

Identifiers
- Aliases: DNAI1, CILD1, DIC1, ICS1, PCD, dynein axonemal intermediate chain 1
- External IDs: OMIM: 604366; MGI: 1916172; GeneCards: DNAI1

Gene location (Human)
Chr.	Chromosome 9 (human)
Band	9p13.3	Start	34,457,414 bp
Band	9p13.3	End	34,520,988 bp

Gene location (Mouse)
Chr.	Chromosome 4 (mouse)
Band	4|4 A5	Start	41,569,775 bp
Band	4|4 A5	End	41,638,158 bp
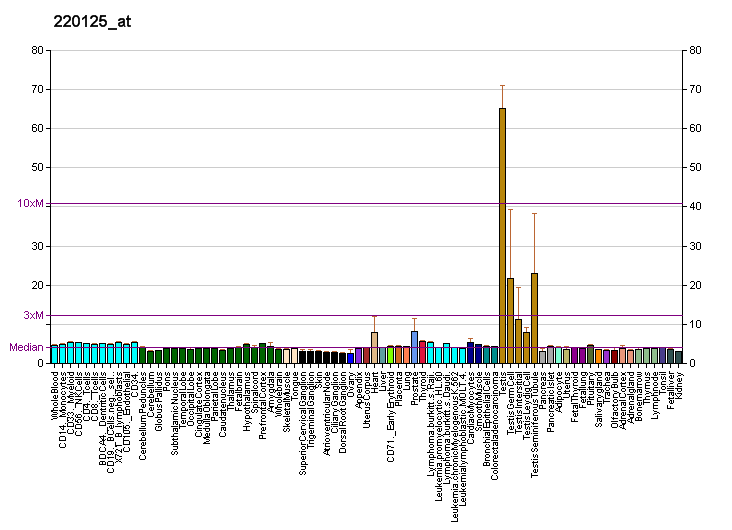
RNA expression pattern
Bgee	Human / Mouse (ortholog); Top expressed in: right uterine tube; bronchial epithelial cell; left testis; right testis; olfactory zone of nasal mucosa; anterior pituitary; mucosa of paranasal sinus; testicle; sperm; right lung / Top expressed in: lumbar subsegment of spinal cord; spermatid; spermatocyte; seminiferous tubule; interventricular septum; yolk sac; morula; embryo; visual cortex; neural layer of retina; More reference expression data
BioGPS	More reference expression data
Gene ontology
Molecular function	cytoskeletal motor activity; protein binding; plus-end-directed microtubule motor activity; dynein light chain binding; dynein heavy chain binding
Cellular component	cytoplasm; dynein complex; cell projection; microtubule; cytoskeleton; outer dynein arm; cilium
Biological process	flagellated sperm motility; cilium movement; determination of left/right symmetry; outer dynein arm assembly; cell projection organization; microtubule-based movement
Sources:Amigo / QuickGO
Orthologs
Databases	NCBI: entry; OMA: entry
Species	Human	Mouse
Entrez	27019	68922
Ensembl	ENSG00000122735	ENSMUSG00000061322
UniProt	Q9UI46; Q5T8G8	Q8C0M8
RefSeq (mRNA)	NM_001281428; NM_012144	NM_175138
RefSeq (protein)	NP_001268357; NP_036276	NP_780347
Location (UCSC)	Chr 9: 34.46 – 34.52 Mb	Chr 4: 41.57 – 41.64 Mb
PubMed search
- Wikidata
View/Edit Human	View/Edit Mouse

Dynein axonemal intermediate chain 1 is a protein that in humans is encoded by the DNAI1 gene.

The inner- and outer-arm dyneins, which bridge between the doublet microtubules in axonemes, are the force-generating proteins responsible for the sliding movement in axonemes. The intermediate and light chains, thought to form the base of the dynein arm, help mediate attachment and may also participate in regulating dynein activity. This gene encodes an intermediate chain dynein, belonging to the large family of motor proteins. Mutations in this gene result in abnormal ciliary ultrastructure and function associated with primary ciliary dyskinesia (PCD) and Kartagener syndrome. The DNAI1 gene is involved in the development of proper respiratory function, motility of spermatozoa, and asymmetrical organization of the viscera during embryogenesis. This gene affects these three very different aspects of development because all three are dependent on proper cilia function. DNAI1 codes for the development of cilia ultrastructure in the upper and lower respiratory tracts, spermatozoa flagellae, and nodal cilia (cilia of the primitive node). DNAI1 specifically encodes for an intermediate chain of the outer dynein arm. Each dynein arm of the ciliary axoneme has an inner and outer dynein arm. A mutation in DNAI1 can lead to defective ciliary beating. A DNAI1 gene mutation accounts for 4-10% of all cases of primary ciliary dyskensia (PCD). The most frequent structural defect in cilia of PCD patients are abnormal dynein arms. A common mutation of DNAI1 leading to PCD is a hot-spot mutation in intron 1 of the gene. Mutations in coding or splicing are only found in 10% of PCD cases.
