= DNAAF2 =

Protein-coding gene in the species Homo sapiens

Identifiers
- Aliases: DNAAF2, C14orf104, CILD10, KTU, PF13, dynein (axonemal) assembly factor 2, dynein axonemal assembly factor 2
- External IDs: OMIM: 612517; MGI: 1923566; GeneCards: DNAAF2

Gene location (Human)
Chr.	Chromosome 14 (human)
Band	14q21.3	Start	49,625,174 bp
Band	14q21.3	End	49,635,244 bp

Gene location (Mouse)
Chr.	Chromosome 12 (mouse)
Band	12|12 C2	Start	69,235,861 bp
Band	12|12 C2	End	69,245,203 bp
RNA expression pattern
Bgee	Human / Mouse (ortholog); Top expressed in: bronchial epithelial cell; oocyte; gonad; mucosa of sigmoid colon; embryo; testicle; Epithelium of choroid plexus; secondary oocyte; jejunum; jejunal mucosa / Top expressed in: spermatocyte; spermatid; testicle; epiblast; proximal tubule; ventricular zone; embryo; yolk sac; embryo; ganglionic eminence; More reference expression data
BioGPS	n/a
Gene ontology
Molecular function	protein binding
Cellular component	cytoplasm; cytosol
Biological process	cilium-dependent cell motility; axonemal dynein complex assembly
Sources:Amigo / QuickGO
Orthologs
Databases	NCBI: entry; OMA: entry
Species	Human	Mouse
Entrez	55172	109065
Ensembl	ENSG00000165506	ENSMUSG00000020973
UniProt	Q9NVR5	Q8BPI1
RefSeq (mRNA)	NM_018139; NM_001083908; NM_001378453	NM_027269
RefSeq (protein)	NP_001077377; NP_060609; NP_001365382	NP_081545
Location (UCSC)	Chr 14: 49.63 – 49.64 Mb	Chr 12: 69.24 – 69.25 Mb
PubMed search
- Wikidata
View/Edit Human	View/Edit Mouse

Kintoun, is a protein that is encoded by the DNAAF2 gene.

== Function ==
Kintoun is a highly conserved protein involved in the preassembly of dynein arm complexes which power cilia. These complexes are found in some cilia and are assembled in the cytoplasm prior to transport for ciliogenesis.

== Clinical significance ==
Mutations in DNAAF2 are associated with primary ciliary dyskinesia.
