= Biörn Ivemark =

Swedish pediatrician and pathologist

Biörn Ivemark (4 May 1925 – 25 March 2005) was a Swedish pediatrician and pathologist. He is credited with characterizing asplenia with cardiovascular anomalies, also sometimes known as "Ivemark syndrome".

Born in Karlstad, Ivemark graduated from Karolinska Institutet (with a med.lic. degree) in 1951 and received his research doctorate in 1955.

He died at Carcassonne, in southern France, in 2005.
