= DNAAF1 =

Protein-coding gene in the species Homo sapiens

Identifiers
- Aliases: DNAAF1, CILD13, LRRC50, ODA7, dynein (axonemal) assembly factor 1, dynein axonemal assembly factor 1, swt, DAU1
- External IDs: OMIM: 613190; MGI: 1915520; GeneCards: DNAAF1

Gene location (Human)
Chr.	Chromosome 16 (human)
Band	16q24.1	Start	84,145,287 bp
Band	16q24.1	End	84,178,767 bp

Gene location (Mouse)
Chr.	Chromosome 8 (mouse)
Band	8|8 E1	Start	120,301,974 bp
Band	8|8 E1	End	120,325,193 bp
RNA expression pattern
Bgee	Human / Mouse (ortholog); Top expressed in: right uterine tube; bronchial epithelial cell; left testis; right testis; olfactory zone of nasal mucosa; nasal epithelium; mucosa of paranasal sinus; male germ cell; sperm; caput epididymis / Top expressed in: seminiferous tubule; spermatid; spermatocyte; morula; ascending aorta; jejunum; aortic valve; blastocyst; duodenum; pharynx; More reference expression data
BioGPS	n/a
Gene ontology
Molecular function	dynein complex binding
Cellular component	cell projection; spindle pole; plasma membrane; cilium; axoneme; cytoskeleton; cytoplasm; cytosol; nuclear speck; extracellular region
Biological process	cilium assembly; determination of pancreatic left/right asymmetry; outer dynein arm assembly; axonemal dynein complex assembly; lung development; epithelial cilium movement involved in determination of left/right asymmetry; determination of digestive tract left/right asymmetry; determination of liver left/right asymmetry; heart looping; cilium movement; inner dynein arm assembly; left/right pattern formation; regulation of cilium beat frequency; motile cilium assembly
Sources:Amigo / QuickGO
Orthologs
Databases	NCBI: entry; OMA: entry
Species	Human	Mouse
Entrez	123872	68270
Ensembl	ENSG00000154099	ENSMUSG00000031831
UniProt	Q8NEP3	Q9D2H9
RefSeq (mRNA)	NM_178452; NM_001318756	NM_026648
RefSeq (protein)	NP_001305685; NP_848547	NP_080924
Location (UCSC)	Chr 16: 84.15 – 84.18 Mb	Chr 8: 120.3 – 120.33 Mb
PubMed search
- Wikidata
View/Edit Human	View/Edit Mouse

Dynein axonemal assembly factor 1 is a protein that in humans is encoded by the DNAAF1 gene (previously LRRC50)

== Function ==
Dynein axonemal assembly factor 1 is cilium-specific and is required for the stability of the ciliary architecture. It is involved in the regulation of microtubule-based cilia and actin-based brush border microvilli.

== Clinical significance ==
Mutations in the DNAAF1 gene are associated with primary ciliary dyskinesia.
