= ZIC3 =

Protein-coding gene in the species Homo sapiens

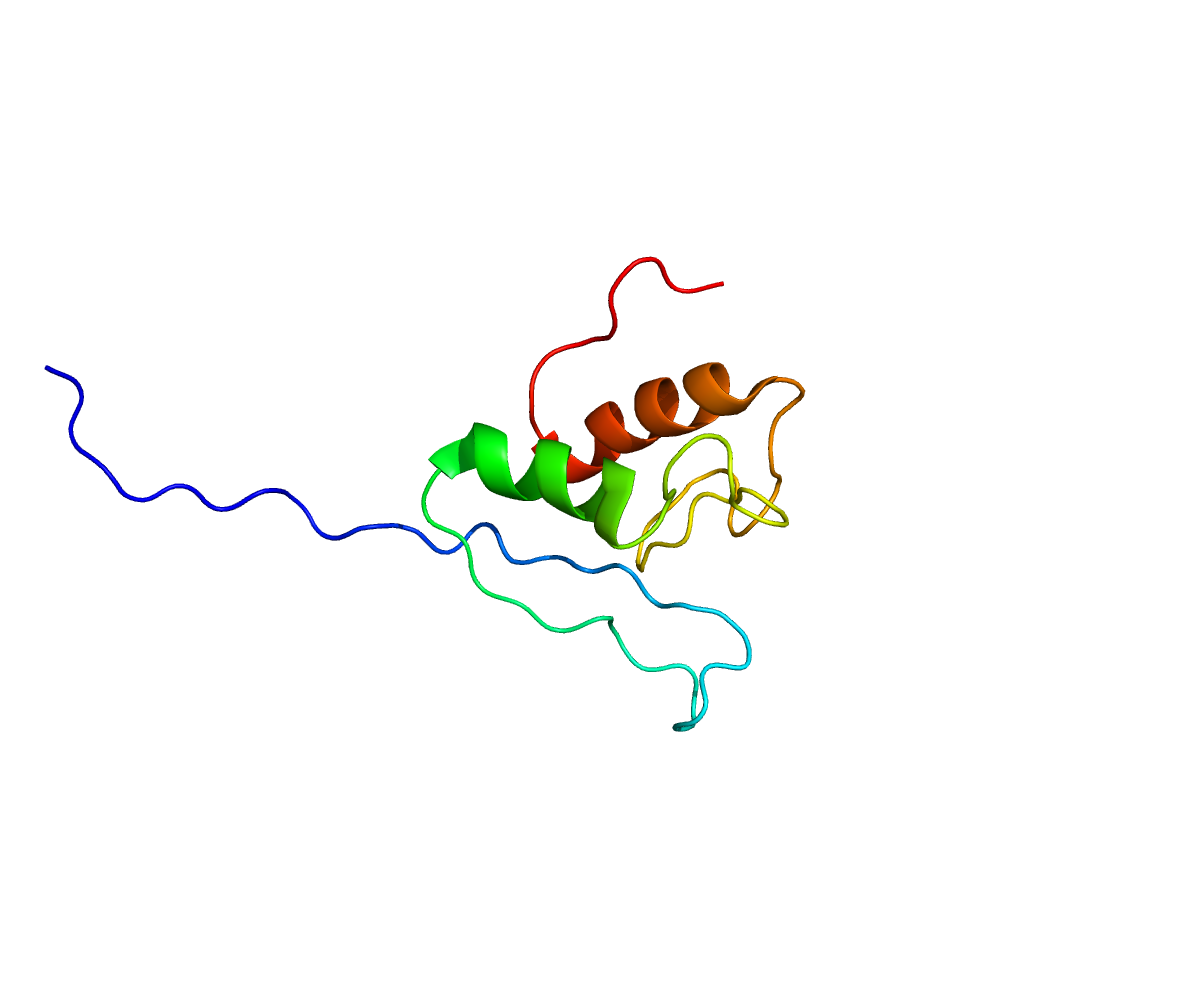

Identifiers
- Aliases: ZIC3, HTX, HTX1, VACTERLX, ZNF203, Zic family member 3
- External IDs: OMIM: 300265; MGI: 106676; GeneCards: ZIC3
Available structures
PDB	Ortholog search: PDBe RCSB
PDB	List of PDB id codes 2EJ4, 2RPC

Gene location (Human)
Chr.	X chromosome (human)
Band	Xq26.3	Start	137,566,127 bp
Band	Xq26.3	End	137,577,691 bp

Gene location (Mouse)
Chr.	X chromosome (mouse)
Band	X A6|X 32.56 cM	Start	57,068,060 bp
Band	X A6|X 32.56 cM	End	57,087,096 bp
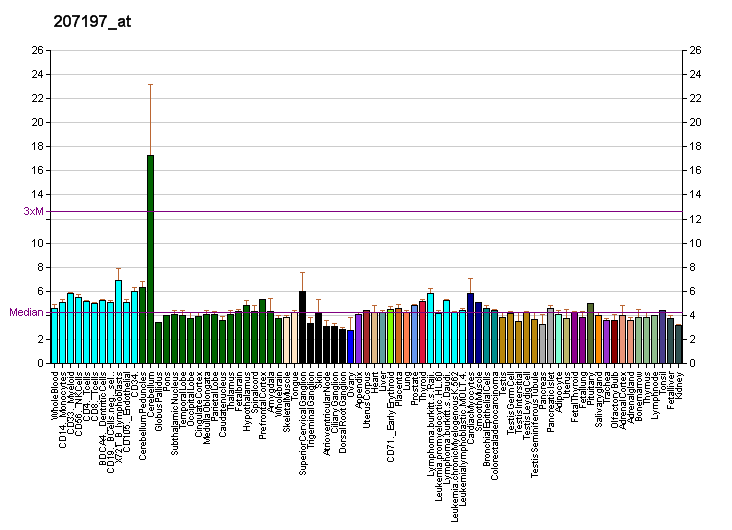
RNA expression pattern
Bgee	Human / Mouse (ortholog); Top expressed in: right hemisphere of cerebellum; testicle; paraflocculus of cerebellum; ventricular zone; cerebellar vermis; embryo; ganglionic eminence; optic nerve; C1 segment; hypothalamus / Top expressed in: primitive streak; Epithelium of choroid plexus; ciliary body; epiblast; iris; tail of embryo; choroid plexus of fourth ventricle; lumbar subsegment of spinal cord; Rostral migratory stream; lateral septal nucleus; More reference expression data
BioGPS	More reference expression data
Gene ontology
Molecular function	protein binding; DNA binding; nucleic acid binding; sequence-specific DNA binding; metal ion binding; DNA-binding transcription factor activity; DNA-binding transcription activator activity, RNA polymerase II-specific; RNA polymerase II cis-regulatory region sequence-specific DNA binding; RNA polymerase II transcription regulatory region sequence-specific DNA binding; DNA-binding transcription factor activity, RNA polymerase II-specific
Cellular component	cytoplasm; nucleus; nucleoplasm
Biological process	determination of left/right symmetry; somatic stem cell population maintenance; determination of pancreatic left/right asymmetry; nervous system development; determination of digestive tract left/right asymmetry; multicellular organism development; heart looping; cell differentiation; regulation of transcription, DNA-templated; anterior/posterior pattern specification; determination of liver left/right asymmetry; pattern specification process; transcription, DNA-templated; lung development; determination of left/right asymmetry in nervous system; positive regulation of transcription, DNA-templated; positive regulation of transcription by RNA polymerase II; transcription by RNA polymerase II; central nervous system development
Sources:Amigo / QuickGO
Orthologs
Databases	NCBI: entry; OMA: entry
Species	Human	Mouse
Entrez	7547	22773
Ensembl	ENSG00000156925	ENSMUSG00000067860
UniProt	O60481	Q62521
RefSeq (mRNA)	NM_003413; NM_001330661	NM_009575
RefSeq (protein)	NP_001317590; NP_003404	NP_033601
Location (UCSC)	Chr X: 137.57 – 137.58 Mb	Chr X: 57.07 – 57.09 Mb
PubMed search
- Wikidata
View/Edit Human	View/Edit Mouse

ZIC3 is a member of the Zinc finger of the cerebellum (ZIC) protein family.

ZIC3 is classified as a ZIC protein due to conservation of the five C2H2 zinc fingers, which enables the protein to interact with DNA and proteins. Correct function of this protein family in critical for early development, and as such mutations of the genes encoding these proteins is known to result in various congenital defects. For example, mutation of ZIC3 is associated with heterotaxy, that is thought to occur due to the role of ZIC3 in initial left-right symmetry formation, which involves the maintaining redistributed Nodal after the asymmetry of the embryo is initially broken. Mutation of ZIC3 is also associated with various heart defects, such as heart looping, however these are thought to represent a mild form of heterotaxy. Mouse based studies have linked defective ZIC3 with neural tube defects (spina bifida and exencephaly) and skeletal defects as well indicated a role for Zic3 in neural crest specification. Both the left-right defects and the neural tube defects caused by loss of Zic3 have been linked to defective planar cell polarity.

ZIC3 is also of particular interest as it has been shown to be required for maintenance of embryonic stem cell pluripotency.

== Involvement in Wnt signalling ==
ZIC2, another member of the ZIC family, has recently been found to interact with TCF7L2, enabling it to act as a Wnt/β-catenin signalling inhibitor. Further experiments have indicated that human ZIC3 is also able to inhibit Wnt signalling and that the Zinc finger domains are absolutely critical for this role. Such a role is of critical importance, as not only is correct Wnt signalling critical for early development, Wnt signalling has also been found to be upregulated to several cancers. In addition Zic3 inhibition of canonical Wnt has recently been shown to have a role in specification of the neural crest in mice.
