= DNAI2 =

Protein-coding gene in the species Homo sapiens

Identifiers
- Aliases: DNAI2, CILD9, DIC2, dynein axonemal intermediate chain 2
- External IDs: OMIM: 605483; MGI: 2685574; GeneCards: DNAI2

Gene location (Human)
Chr.	Chromosome 17 (human)
Band	17q25.1	Start	74,274,247 bp
Band	17q25.1	End	74,314,884 bp

Gene location (Mouse)
Chr.	Chromosome 11 (mouse)
Band	11|11 E2	Start	114,618,234 bp
Band	11|11 E2	End	114,648,715 bp
RNA expression pattern
Bgee	Human / Mouse (ortholog); Top expressed in: right uterine tube; bronchial epithelial cell; mucosa of paranasal sinus; left testis; right testis; olfactory zone of nasal mucosa; nasal epithelium; sperm; epithelium of nasopharynx; testicle / Top expressed in: spermatid; otolith organ; utricle; seminiferous tubule; olfactory epithelium; spermatocyte; vestibular sensory epithelium; Epithelium of choroid plexus; right lung lobe; blastocyst; More reference expression data
BioGPS	n/a
Gene ontology
Molecular function	microtubule motor activity; cytoskeletal motor activity; protein binding; plus-end-directed microtubule motor activity; dynein light chain binding; dynein heavy chain binding
Cellular component	cytoplasm; axonemal dynein complex; dynein complex; axoneme; cell projection; sperm flagellum; cilium; microtubule; outer dynein arm; cytoskeleton; external side of plasma membrane
Biological process	cilium movement; determination of left/right symmetry; outer dynein arm assembly; cell projection organization; cilium assembly; microtubule-based movement
Sources:Amigo / QuickGO
Orthologs
Databases	NCBI: entry; OMA: entry
Species	Human	Mouse
Entrez	64446	432611
Ensembl	ENSG00000171595	ENSMUSG00000034706
UniProt	Q9GZS0	A2AC93
RefSeq (mRNA)	NM_001172810; NM_023036; NM_001353167	NM_001034878
RefSeq (protein)	NP_001166281; NP_075462; NP_001340096	NP_001030050
Location (UCSC)	Chr 17: 74.27 – 74.31 Mb	Chr 11: 114.62 – 114.65 Mb
PubMed search
- Wikidata
View/Edit Human	View/Edit Mouse

Dynein axonemal intermediate chain 2 also known as axonemal dynein intermediate chain 2, is a protein that in humans is encoded by the DNAI2 gene.

== Function ==
The protein encoded by this gene belongs to the dynein intermediate chain family, and is part of the dynein complex of respiratory cilia and sperm flagella.

== Clinical significance ==
Mutations in the DNAI2 gene are associated with primary ciliary dyskinesia.
