= What I Call Life =

2005 young adult novel by Jill Wolfson

- Author: Jill Wolfson
- Language: English
- Publisher: Henry Holt
- Publication date: 2005
- Publication place: United States
- ISBN: 9780805076691
- LC Class: PZ7.W8332 Wh

What I Call Life is a young adult novel by Jill Wolfson. It was first published in 2005 by Henry Holt and Company Publishers. The novel is about a pre-teen girl entering the social welfare system. She is taken away from her mother and placed in a group home.

== Plot introduction ==
Cal Lavender lives with her mother and largely manages daily responsibilities despite her young age. After her mother experiences a mental health crisis in a public library, authorities intervene, and Cal is taken into protective custody and transported to a police station.

Cal is placed in a group home with four other girls, supervised by an older woman known as the Knitting Lady. Initially, Cal struggles to adjust to the environment and feels out of place. Over time, she begins to recognize shared experiences among the residents, including the Knitting Lady. Cal believes her stay will be brief, but her return home ultimately takes longer than she expects.

The four other girls at the group home are: Amber- The quiet, and almost bald, shy one who does not talk for the whole beginning of the book; Monica- The whiny, annoying one; Fern- The one who laughs at almost anything Whitney says; and Whitney- The girl who has had so much done to her, she made a list. For example, # 14.: Got dropped on head by Santa at a group home party. Whitney is probably the most important girl living in the group home with Cal. The five of them go off to find Whitney's sister, but, in the end, Cal discovers that this "sister" doesn't exist at all, and the only other ones who know about it are Amber & Whitney herself. Whitney also has a pet pill bug named Ike Eisenhower the 5th, whose brother, Mike the 5th, died already.

Throughout the book, the Knitting Lady (whose name is revealed at the very end) tells them a story about a young girl named Lillian who went on an "Orphan Train" in the early 1900s. She finally tells them that, when Lillian grew up, she had a daughter named Brenda who was dropped off at a group home, just like Cal. Eventually, Betty (Cal's mother) comes and takes Cal back home. Cal never hears from Whitney, Amber, Monica, Fern nor the Knitting Lady again, but they remain in her heart.

== Awards and recognition ==
- Booklist Top 10 First Novels for Youth 2005
- Junior Library Guild Selection
- Maine Student Book Award Selection
