= Jill Wolfson =

American journalist and young adult novel author

- Born: Jill Wolfson; Philadelphia, Pennsylvania
- Occupations: Author, Journalist
- Writing career
- Genres: Contemporary, Young Adult
- Website: www.jillwolfson.com

Jill Wolfson is an American journalist and young adult novel author. Her novels and articles concern children in the social welfare system and foster care. Her latest novel is about organ donation.

== Biography ==
She was born and raised in Philadelphia, Pennsylvania. After attending Temple University, she worked for newspapers and magazines around the country, such as the Fort Lauderdale Sun-Sentinel and San Jose Mercury News. Her award-winning novels for young people include What I Call Life; Home, and Other Big, Fat Lies; and Cold Hands, Warm Heart, all published by Henry Holt and Company Publishers. In 2007, Wolfson contributed to the national radio show This American Life with a story about organ donation.

Wolfson has taught writing at several universities and is a long-time volunteer in a writing program for incarcerated youth. She lives in Santa Cruz, California, and has two children.

== Bibliography ==
- What I Call Life, 2005
- Home, and Other Big, Fat Lies, 2006
- Cold Hands, Warm Heart, 2009
- Furious, 2013
