= Home, and Other Big, Fat Lies =

2006 childrens' novel by Jill Wolfson

- First edition cover
- Author: Jill Wolfson
- Publisher: Henry Holt & Co.
- Publication date: October 1, 2006
- ISBN: 0-8050-7670-0

Home, and Other Big, Fat Lies is a junior fiction novel by American writer Jill Wolfson. It was published in October, 2006 by Henry Holt and Company. The story concerns a young girl, Whitney, who has been in numerous foster homes.

== Plot summary ==
Whitney, a hyper and loud-mouthed foster child that is messy and small for her age, has been in so many foster homes that she can give a complete rundown on the most common varieties of foster parents. By her twelfth home, she finds out that the next foster home she is heading to seems to be in the middle of nowhere, all the way at the top of the map of California, surrounded by nothing other than trees. Whitney is nervous. She is sure that the middle of nowhere is going to be somewhere that she won’t be welcome at for long.

== Reception ==
=== Reviews ===
Kelly Czarnecki, writing for School Library Journal, highlighted in her review how "the protagonist's spunky voice will engage readers" and compared Home, and Other Big, Fat Lies to Patricia Reilly Giff's Pictures of Hollis Woods.

Kirkus Reviews described Home, and Other Big, Fat Lies as "a sweet, spirited tale told with warmth and humor about a determined misfit who finds a home at last in a family and a community".

Publication Voice of Youth Advocates (a magazine for librarians) suggests Home, and Other Big, Fat Lies includes "no preaching" and is "just honest to goodness situational humor perfect for starting a discussion on environmental topics."

Also discussing the book's discussion of environmental issues, Deborah Stevenson, writing foThe Bulletin of the Center for Children's Books, added that "the book offers a fair look into a timber-dependent community's bitterness about environmental issues, but it's also evocative in conveying the richness of the ecosystems that lumbering can destroy."

=== Awards and honors ===
Home, and Other Big, Fat Lies has received multiple awards and honors:

- International Reading Association, Children's Book Award Notable Book
- Newton Marasco Foundation, Green Earth Book Award Honor Book
- Santa Monica Library Green Award
- Pennsylvania School Librarian Association, Young Reader’s Choice nominee
- Texas Lone Star Reading List Selection
- Kansas State Reading Circle
- New York Public Library 100 Titles for Reading and Sharing
