= Isolated levocardia =

Reversed position of all chest and abdomen organs except the heart

Isolated levocardia (also known as situs inversus with levocardia) is a rare type of organs' situs inversus in which the heart is still in normal position but other abdominal viscera are transposed. Isolated levocardia may occur with heart defects and patients without having operations have low life expectancy: only about 5% to 13% of patients survive more than 5 years. Therefore, even though the risk of cardiac surgeries is high, once patients are diagnosed, operations are suggested to be held as soon as possible. Isolated levocardia is congenital. So far, there is not sufficient evidence to prove that chromosome abnormalities will result in isolated levocardia, and the cause of isolated levocardia is still unknown.

== Symptoms ==
Symptoms are dependent upon complications. Isolated levocardia without complications may have no symptoms. Symptoms of untreated cardiac defects may range from low exercise tolerance to death.

== Diagnosis ==
Systematic examination is needed to be diagnosed. To determine the position of organs and major blood vessels of isolated levocardia patients, ultrasonography, CT, and MRI are used alone and in combination:

- The advantage of ultrasonography is that it is noninvasive, and its good temporal and spatial resolution helps to evaluate cardiac valve motion in variable imaging planes. However, imaging may be interfered because of overlying bony structures, air in the lungs or bowel, wounds, or chest wall fibrosis.
- CT scanning presents a larger visual field. Images will in high spatial resolution and the anatomic structures can be displayed in three dimensions. Thus, CT scanning is able to better demonstrate anatomic relationships and avert additional invasive studies. If the scanning times is faster in the near future, structures will be in even greater definition.
- Since magnetic resonance imaging (MRI) can provide with clear tissue contrast between vasculature and other surrounding structures, MRI technology is considered to have some benefits over ultrasound and CT scans. However, more studies are needed to confirm the diagnostic value of this technique.

Through data comparison, the average value of cardiovascular malformation in levocardia patients is 4.8±1.8, and for isolated levocardia, the average value is 3.0±1.7.

Through the analysis of isolated levocardia cases, some common features of isolated levocardia patients are:

- Pulmonary blood flow is inadequate
- Right ventricle is enlarged
- Pulmonary venous return to the right side of the heart
- The aorta is right-sided

== Incidence & complications ==
In general population, the incidence of isolated levocardia is 1: 22,000; in all patients with congenital heart disease, the incidence is from 0.4% to 1.2%.

There are extensive cases reporting that children and adults with isolated levocardia have complex cardiac defects, and neonate or infant with isolated levocardia may be complicated by bowel obstruction and cardiac anomalies. It is estimated that up to 95% of cases of isolated levocardia have associated cardiac deformities like right ventricular outflow tract (RVOT) obstruction, septal defects, inversion of cardiac chambers and transposition of cardiac chambers.

== Prevention & treatment ==
=== Examination ===
Isolated levocardia is congenital, and so far, there is no efficient way to prevent it. However, in the prenatal period, a prenatal evaluation is suggested. It is recommended to include determination of the situs, identification of heart anomalies, and detection of the major vessels and abdominal viscera in the prenatal evaluation. In the postnatal period, a detection of IVC interruption may be helpful and a prophylactic lifelong antibiotic should be prescribed for the neonate to treat the increase of incidence of overwhelming sepsis in congenital asplenia. Besides, parents should be counseled appropriately.

With accurate, thorough sonographic examination and if there is no congenital heart malformations and chromosomal aberrations, the risk of morbidity and mortality will decrease.

=== Operation ===
If defects of the heart or intestines are present, surgical treatment may be required. Potential surgeries include: Blalock-Taussig, total cavopulmonary connection (Fontan procedure), Rastelli procedure. Blalock-Taussig is a traditional procedure, and Fontan procedure is widely operated recently. The goal of most isolated levocardia surgeries is to rebuild parts of the heart and "redirect" the way blood flows in order to augment pulmonary blood flow.

Cardiac surgeries have high risk. Despite the advances in the operative management, morbidity and mortality remain high. Most death after receiving operations may attribute to a combination of cardiac failure and renal insufficiency. The surgical strategy chosen – hybrid versus traditional procedures, choices regarding the most appropriate pulmonary blood flow – will affect management throughout a patient's life. However, further studies are still required to identify determinants of the optimal surgical strategy in individual patients.

In cases of intestinal malrotation, treatment may require a Ladd's procedure.

== Some cases and operation results ==
- A ten-year-old boy received a Blalock-Taussig operation in 1947. He was diagnosed to have isolated levocardia, a pulmonic stenosis with a ventricular septal defect and an overriding aorta. After the operation, he gradually suffered from cardiac failure and died from it.
- In 1948, a 15-month-old white female was considered to have isolated levocardia, tetralogy of Fallot with an auricular septal defect, a left aortic arch and a left superior vena cava. Her condition was temporarily improved but she still died 6 months after the operation from gradually developed cardiac failure and anuria with uremia and convulsions.
- A Blalock-Taussig operation performed by Dr. Alfred Blalock in 1947 helped to significantly improve the condition of the patient. Before the operation, the patient was diagnosed to have isolated levocardia, pulmonary stenosis, overriding aorta with a right aortic arch and anomalous return of the pulmonary and systemic circulations. After the operation, his heart enlarged but he did not develop cardiac failure and he was even able to walk a long distance without drastic discomfort.
- A boy's exercise tolerance remarkably improved after receiving a Blalock-Taussig operation in 1947. The size of his heart did not change a lot after the operation and there was no evidence of cardiac failure.
- In 1948, a patient who had diagnosed to have situs inversus of the abdominal viscera with levocardia and tetralogy of Fallot gained weight after receiving the Blalock-Taussig operation and was able to easily finish a 1.5 miles walk.
