= Symmetry breaking and cortical rotation =

Symmetry breaking in biology is the process by which uniformity is broken, or the number of points to view invariance are reduced, to generate a more structured and improbable state. Symmetry breaking is the event where symmetry along a particular axis is lost to establish a polarity. Polarity is a measure for a biological system to distinguish poles along an axis. This measure is important because it is the first step to building complexity. For example, during organismal development, one of the first steps for the embryo is to distinguish its dorsal-ventral axis. The symmetry-breaking event that occurs here will determine which end of this axis will be the ventral side, and which end will be the dorsal side. Once this distinction is made, then all the structures that are located along this axis can develop at the proper location. As an example, during human development, the embryo needs to establish where is 'back' and where is 'front' before complex structures, such as the spine and lungs, can develop in the right location (where the lungs are placed 'in front' of the spine). This relationship between symmetry breaking and complexity was articulated by P.W. Anderson. He speculated that increasing levels of broken symmetry in many-body systems correlates with increasing complexity and functional specialization. In a biological perspective, the more complex an organism is, the higher number of symmetry-breaking events can be found.

The importance of symmetry breaking in biology is also reflected in the fact that it's found at all scales. Symmetry breaking can be found at the macromolecular level, at the subcellular level and even at the tissues and organ level. It's also interesting to note that most asymmetry on a higher scale is a reflection of symmetry breaking on a lower scale. Cells first need to establish a polarity through a symmetry-breaking event before tissues and organs themselves can be polar. For example, one model proposes that left-right body axis asymmetry in vertebrates is determined by asymmetry of cilia rotation during early development, which will produce a constant, unidirectional flow. However, there is also evidence that earlier asymmetries in serotonin distribution and ion-channel mRNA and protein localization occur in zebrafish, chicken and Xenopus development, and similar to observations of intrinsic chirality generated by the cytoskeleton leading to organ and whole organism asymmetries in Arabidopsis this itself seems to be controlled from the macromolecular level by the cytoskeleton.

There are several examples of symmetry breaking that are currently being studied. One of the most studied examples is the cortical rotation during Xenopus development, where this rotation acts as the symmetry-breaking event that determines the dorsal-ventral axis of the developing embryo. This example is discussed in more detail below.
Another example that involves symmetry breaking is the establishment of dendrites and axon during neuron development, and the PAR protein network in C. elegans. It is thought that a protein called shootin-1 determines which outgrowth in neurons eventually becomes the axon, as it does this by breaking symmetry and accumulating in only one outgrowth. The PAR protein network works under similar mechanisms, where the certain PAR proteins, which are initially homogenous throughout the cell, break their symmetry and are segregated to different ends of the zygote to establish a polarity during development.

== Cortical rotation ==
Cortical rotation is a phenomenon that seems to be limited to Xenopus and few ancient teleosts, however the underlying mechanisms of cortical rotation have conserved elements that are found in other chordates.

A sperm can bind a Xenopus egg at any position of the pigmented animal hemisphere; however, once bound, this position then determines the dorsal side of the animal. The dorsal side of the egg is always directly opposite the sperm entry point. The sperm's centriole acts as an organizing center for the egg's microtubules, which transport the maternal dorsalizing factors, such as wnt11 mRNA, wnt5a mRNA, and Dishevelled protein.

== Molecular mechanisms ==
A series of experiments utilizing UV irradiation, cold temperature and pressure (all of which cause microtubule depolymerization) demonstrated that without polymerized microtubules, cortical rotation did not occur and resulted in a mutant ventral phenotype. Another study also revealed that mutant phenotype could be rescued (returned to normal) by physically turning the embryo, thus mimicking cortical rotation and demonstrating that microtubules were not the determinant of dorsal development. From this it was hypothesized that there were other elements within the embryo being moved during cortical rotation.

To identify these elements, researchers looked for mRNA and protein that demonstrated localization to either the vegetal pole or the dorsal side of the embryo to find candidates. The early candidates for the determinant were β-catenin and disheveled (Dsh). When maternal β-catenin mRNA was degraded in the oocyte, the resulting embryo developed into mutant ventral phenotype and this could be rescued by injecting the fertilized egg with β-catenin mRNA. β-catenin is observed to be enriched in the dorsal side of the embryo following cortical rotation. The Dsh protein was fused to a GFP and tracked during cortical rotation, it was observed to be in vesicles that were couriered along microtubules to the dorsal side. This led researchers to look into other candidates of the Wnt pathway. Wnt 11 was found to be located specifically at the vegetal pole prior to cortical rotation and is moved to the dorsal side where it activates the wnt signaling pathway. VegT, a T-box transcription factor, is localized to the vegetal cortex and upon cortical rotation is released in a gradient fashion into the embryo to regulate mesoderm development. VegT activates Wnt expression, so while not acted on or moved during cortical rotation, it is active in dorsal-ventral axis formation.

The question still remains, how are these molecules being moved to the dorsal side? This is still not completely known, however evidence suggests that microtubule bundles within the cortex are interacting with kinesin (plus-end directed) motors to become organized into parallel arrays within the cortex and this motion of the motors is the cause of the rotation of the cortex. Also unclear is whether Wnt 11 is the main dorsal determinant or is β-catenin also required, as these two molecules have both been demonstrated to be necessary and sufficient for dorsal development. This along with all of the other factors are important for activating Nodal genes that propagate normal dorsoventral development.
