= Cryptic protein =

Protein found in humans

CFC1

Identifiers
- Aliases: CFC1, cripto, FRL-1, cryptic family 1, AV265756, b2b970Clo, cryptic, CFC1B, DTGA2, HTX2
- External IDs: OMIM: 605194; MGI: 109448; GeneCards: CFC1

Gene location (Human)
| Chr. | Chromosome 2 (human) |
| Band | 2q21.1 | Start | 130,592,165 bp |
| Band | 2q21.1 | End | 130,599,575 bp |

Gene location (Mouse)
| Chr. | Chromosome 1 (mouse) |
| Band | 1|1 B | Start | 34,574,729 bp |
| Band | 1|1 B | End | 34,583,394 bp |
RNA expression pattern
| Bgee | Human / Mouse (ortholog); Top expressed in: islet of Langerhans; pituitary gland; anterior pituitary; gonad; hypothalamus; body of pancreas; testicle; nucleus accumbens; primary visual cortex; cerebellum / Top expressed in: embryo; mesoderm; gastrula; morula; blastocyst; embryo; embryonic organizer; lateral plate mesoderm; epiblast; condyle; More reference expression data |
| BioGPS | n/a |
Gene ontology
| Molecular function | nodal binding; molecular function; signaling receptor binding; activin receptor binding |
| Cellular component | extracellular region; anchored component of membrane; plasma membrane; membrane; cellular component; cell surface |
| Biological process | multicellular organism development; determination of left/right symmetry; gastrulation; nodal signaling pathway; development of the heart; anterior/posterior pattern specification; BMP signaling pathway; anatomical structure development |
Sources:Amigo / QuickGO
Orthologs
| Databases | NCBI: entry; OMA: entry |
| Species | Human | Mouse |
| Entrez | 55997 | 12627 |
| Ensembl | ENSG00000136698 | ENSMUSG00000026124 |
| UniProt | P0CG37 | P97766 |
| RefSeq (mRNA) | NM_001270420; NM_001270421; NM_032545 | NM_007685 |
| RefSeq (protein) | NP_001257349; NP_001257350; NP_115934 | NP_031711 |
| Location (UCSC) | Chr 2: 130.59 – 130.6 Mb | Chr 1: 34.57 – 34.58 Mb |
| PubMed search |
- Wikidata
| View/Edit Human | View/Edit Mouse |

Cryptic protein, also cryptic family member 1, is a protein that in humans is encoded by the CFC1 gene.

== Function ==
CFC1 is located on chromosome 2 and encodes a member of the epidermal growth factor (EGF)- Cripto, Frl-1, and Cryptic (CFC) family, which are involved in signalling during embryonic development. Proteins in this family share a variant EGF-like motif, a conserved cysteine-rich domain, and a C-terminal hydrophobic region. The protein encoded by this gene is necessary for patterning the left-right embryonic axis. Mutations in this gene are associated with defects in organ development, including autosomal visceral heterotaxy and congenital heart disease. Alternatively spliced transcript variants encoding multiple isoforms have been observed for this gene.
