= Sito (footballer, born 1988) =

Spanish footballer

Personal information
- Full name: Alfonso Cruz Rodríguez
- Date of birth: 23 February 1988 (age 38)
- Place of birth: Salamanca, Spain
- Height: 1.69 m (5 ft 7 in)
- Position: Right back

Team information
- Current team: Barco

Youth career
- Sporting Garrido
- Salamanca

Senior career*
Years	Team	Apps	(Gls)
2007–2013	Salamanca B		
2009	Salamanca	1	(0)
2009–2010	→ Guijuelo (loan)	21	(0)
2013–2014	Salmantino		
2015–2017	Unionistas	63	(0)
2017–2019	Barco	28	(0)
2019–	Real Ávila CF		(0)
- * Club domestic league appearances and goals as of 20 May 2018

Alfonso Cruz Rodríguez (born 23 February 1988 in Salamanca, Castile and León), known as Sito, is a Spanish footballer who plays for Real Ávila CF as a right back.
