= Ventricular inversion =

- Other names: Atrioventricular discordenance
- Specialty: Cardiology

Ventricular inversion is a condition in which the anatomic right ventricle of the heart is on the left side of the interventricular septum and the anatomic left ventricle is on the right.
