= Situs solitus =

Normal position of thoracic and abdominal organs

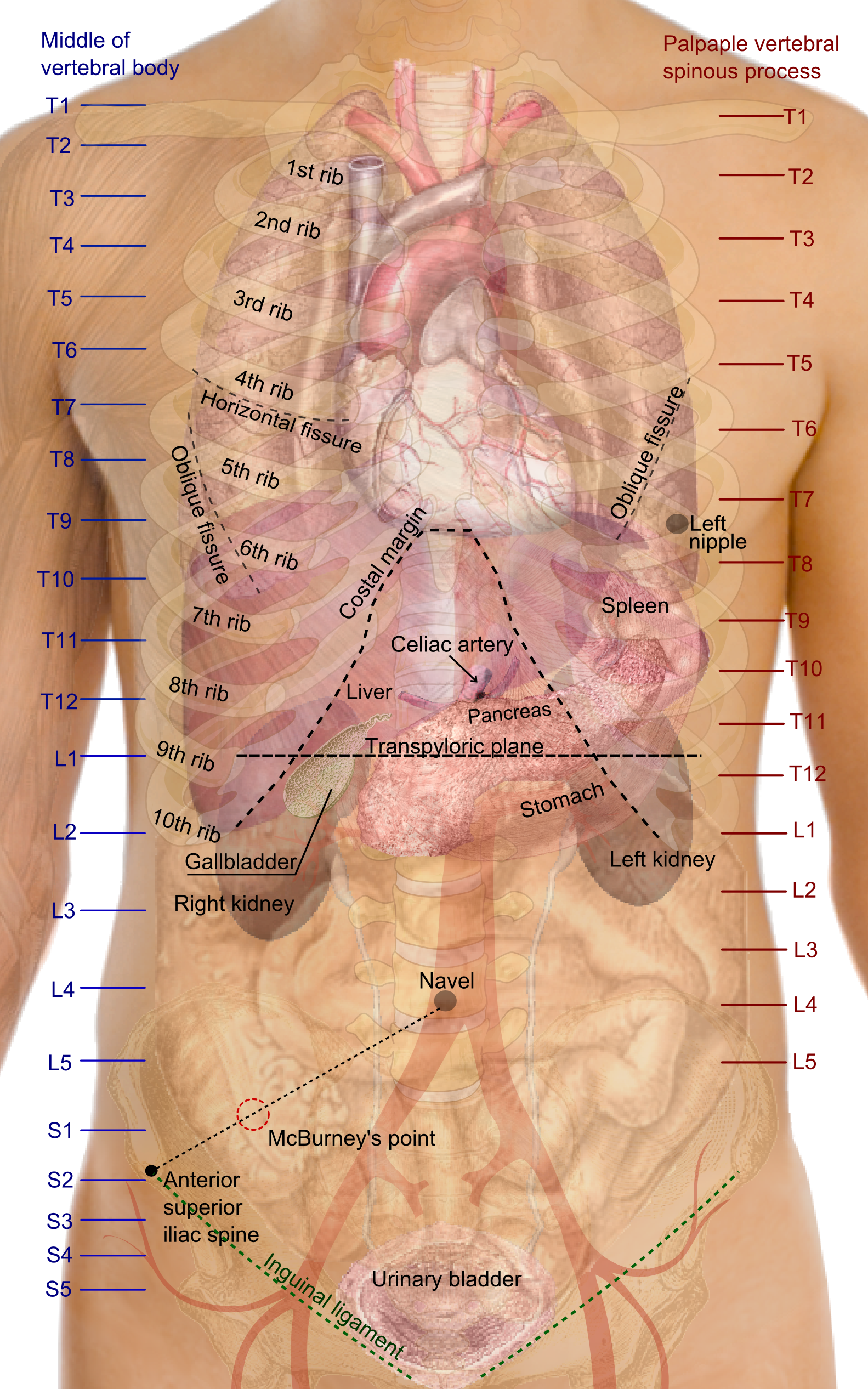
Surface projections of the normally positioned organs of the trunk.

Situs solitus (English: usual site) is the Latin medical term referring to the normal position of thoracic and abdominal organs. Anatomically, this means that the heart is on the left with the pulmonary atrium on the right and the systemic atrium on the left along with the cardiac apex. Right-sided organs are the liver, the gall bladder and a trilobed lung as well as the inferior vena cava, while left-sided organs are the stomach, single spleen, a bilobed lung, and the aorta.

Variants on the normal picture are relatively uncommon. Complete reversal of all organs is known as situs inversus, while reversal of some organs but not others is called situs ambiguus or heterotaxy. Isolated reversal of the heart with normally-patterned viscera otherwise is termed dextrocardia.

== Development ==
Although much of humans' external anatomy is bilaterally symmetric, many internal structures must be signaled to develop asymmetrically in order to form the normal situs solitus orientation. This induced asymmetry is thought to be achieved by a number of morphological factors that guide development. For instance, different levels of NODAL proteins on opposite sides of the embryo have been linked to proper bending of the embryonic heart, giving it its asymmetrical form. As for the question as to how these development-guiding proteins themselves become distributed asymmetrically throughout the embryo, a certain type of embryonic node cell has been identified with cilia known as nodal cilia that move only in a counter-clockwise orientation, thus potentially producing a sort of 'current' in the embryo that would asymmetrically distribute these molecules.

== See also ==
- Situs inversus
- Situs ambiguus
- Chirality (mathematics)
