= Situs ambiguus =

Abnormal placement of organs in the chest and abdomen

- Other names: Situs ambiguous, Heterotaxy, Heterotaxia, Heterotaxi, Atrial Isomerism, Right Isomerism, Left Isomerism, Polysplenia, Asplenia, laterality defects
- Specialty: Cardiology

Situs ambiguus (from Latin 'ambiguous site'), or heterotaxy, is a rare congenital defect in which the major visceral organs are distributed abnormally within the chest and abdomen. Clinically, heterotaxy spectrum generally refers to any defect of left-right asymmetry and arrangement of the visceral organs; however, classical heterotaxy requires multiple organs to be affected. This does not include the congenital defect situs inversus, which results when arrangement of all the organs in the abdomen and chest are mirrored, so the positions are opposite the normal placement. Situs inversus is the mirror image of situs solitus, which is normal asymmetric distribution of the abdominothoracic visceral organs. Situs ambiguus can also be subdivided into left-isomerism and right-isomerism based on the defects observed in the spleen, lungs and atria of the heart.

Individuals with situs inversus or situs solitus do not experience fatal dysfunction of their organ systems, as general anatomy and morphology of the abdominothoracic organ-vessel systems are conserved. Due to abnormal arrangement of organs in situs ambiguus, orientation across the left-right axis of the body is disrupted early in fetal development, resulting in severely flawed cardiac development and function in 50–80% of cases. They also experience complications with systemic and pulmonary blood vessels, significant morbidity, and sometimes death. All patients with situs ambiguus lack lateralization and symmetry of organs in the abdominal and thoracic cavities and are clinically considered to have a form of heterotaxy syndrome.

Heterotaxy with atrial isomerism occurs in 1 out of every 10,000 live births and is associated with approximately 3% of congenital heart disease cases. Additional estimation of incidence and prevalence of isomerism proves difficult due to failure to diagnose and underestimation of the disease by clinicians. Furthermore, right isomerism is much more easily recognized than left isomerism, contributing to the failure to diagnose.

Situs ambiguus is a growing field of research with findings dating back to 1973.

== Signs and symptoms ==
There are a variety of clinical manifestations of situs ambiguus. Acute symptoms can be due to both cardiac and non-cardiac defects. Cyanosis or blue skin coloration, primarily affecting the lips and fingernails, can indicate a systemic or circulatory issue. Poor feeding, failure to thrive, and rapid shallow breathing may also be observed due to poor circulation. Upon examination, arrhythmia and heart murmur may raise further suspicion of a cardiac abnormality. Non-cardiac symptoms include impairments of the liver and gastrointestinal tract. Biliary atresia, or inflammation and destruction of the bile ducts, may lead to jaundice. Vomiting and swelling of the abdominal region are features that suggest improper positioning of the intestines. Poor positioning of the intestine also makes it more prone to blockage, which can result in numerous chronic health issues. Asplenia and polysplenia are also possible features of heterotaxy.

Due to abnormal cardiac development, patients with situs ambiguus usually develop right atrial isomerism consisting of two bilaterally paired right atria, or left atrial isomerism consisting of two bilaterally paired left atria. Clinical features and symptoms can vary dependent upon assignment of left versus right atrial isomerism. In either instance, the apex of the heart will be poorly positioned, which should alert a clinician of the likelihood of atrial isomerism. It is estimated that 5–10% of isomeric patients have mesocardia, in which the heart is positioned at the center of the thorax, 25–50% have dextrocardia, in which the apex of the heart is pointed toward the right side of the thorax, and 50–70% have levocardia, in which the apex of the heart is pointed toward the left side of the thorax.

=== Right atrial appendage isomerism ===
Right atrial appendage isomerism, also called right atrial isomerism, is a cardiac development defect in which the heart has bilateral right atria and atrial attachments in the muscle wall, as opposed to the normal right atrium and left atrium. In right atrial isomerism, the pulmonary blood oxygen tract is damaged due to right-left shunting of blood. In addition, the atrial septum which distinguishes the 2 atria is absent. These impairments, in addition to congestion in the pulmonary tract, allows deoxygenated blood to mix with oxygenated blood, contributing to cyanosis and possible respiratory distress. Poor systemic circulation also results due to improper positioning of the aorta.

=== Left atrial appendage isomerism ===
Left atrial appendage isomerism, also called left atrial isomerism, is a cardiac development defect in which the heart has two bilateral left atria and atrial appendages in the muscle wall. Left atrial isomerism can have varied clinical manifestations, including a later onset of symptoms. Heart failure is often a concern because the inferior vena cava is disrupted due to the inappropriate morphology of the left ventricle to support the vena cava.

=== Conductive nodes and tissues ===
Abnormal development of the heart results in impaired doubles of conductive nodes, as well as faulty electrical fibers throughout the ventricles. Individuals with right atrial isomerism develop two sinoatrial nodes, as they have 2 mirrored right atria, whereas those with left atrial isomerism fail to develop a sinus node at all. Thus, patients with left atrial isomerism are more likely to experience atrial fibrillation, or irregular rapid heart beat, and abnormal heart rhythm, known as atrial flutter. Development of the atrioventricular node and bundle of His largely depends on physiological looping of the ventricles. Abnormal looping of the ventricles contributes to arrhythmia and heart block in fetuses.

=== Bronchial tree and lungs ===
Isomerism of the bronchial tree is not typically damaging and presents no significant clinical complications. Pulmonary valve stenosis results in issues of blood flow to the lungs.

=== Abdominal organs ===
Abdominal organs, including the liver, stomach, intestinal tract, and spleen may be randomly arranged throughout the left-right axis of the body. Distribution of these organs largely dictates treatment, clinical outcomes, and further evaluation.

The liver is typically symmetrical across the left-right axis in patients with situs ambiguus, which is abnormal. A majority of left atrial isomeric patients have defects throughout the biliary tree, which is responsible for bile production, even when the gall bladder is functional and morphologically normal. This biliary atresia can lead to acute problems such as nutrient malabsorption, pale stools, dark urine, and abdominal swelling. If this condition continues without proper treatment, cirrhosis and liver failure become a major concern. Biliary atresia is not usually observed in patients with right atrial isomerism.

Random positioning of the stomach is often one of the first signals of situs ambiguus upon examination. Malrotation of the entire intestinal tract, or improper folding and bulging of the stomach and intestines, results in bowel obstruction. This impairment leads to vomiting, abdominal distension, mucus and blood in the stool. Patients may also experience abdominal pain. Intestinal malrotation is more commonly identified in patients with right atrial isomerism than in those with left atrial isomerism.

Isomeric patients often experience disruptions to splenic development during embryogenesis, resulting in an overall lack of a spleen (asplenia) or development of many spleens (polysplenia). Asplenia is most often observed in patients with right atrial isomerism. Polysplenia results in 90% of patients with left atrial isomerism. Although they have many spleens, each is usually ineffective resulting in functional asplenia. Rarely, left atrial isomeric patients have a single, normal, functional spleen. Patients lacking a functional spleen are in danger of sepsis and must be monitored.

== Causes ==
Situs ambiguus has been linked to family history of malformations and maternal cocaine use, suggesting both genetic and environmental factors play a role. Several genes in the TGF-beta pathway, which controls left-right patterning of visceral organs across the body axis, have been indicated in sporadic and familial cases of atrial isomerism. There is also overlap between genes associated with situs ambiguus and primary ciliary dyskinesia, likely due to the important role of cilia in establishing left-right asymmetry. The planar cell polarity has an important role in positioning these cilia, and thus genes within this pathway are increasingly associated with situs ambiguus.

Disrupted mitochondria function has also been recently linked to heterotaxy.

== Pathophysiology ==
=== Molecular and cellular mechanism ===
Several genes have been identified in normal development of the right-left axis. These genes have been extensively researched. Gene mutations that lead to atrial isomerism is a growing area of research. Mutations in genes that encode proteins in the TGF-beta pathway, including NODAL, NKX2-5, and ZIC3, have been linked to tetralogy of Fallot and hypoplastic left heart syndrome. Mutations in the ZIC3 gene, which encodes a zinc finger family transcription factor, is linked to a 50% risk of atrial isomerism in families. It is also an X-linked disorder, so testing for ZIC3 mutations is highly encouraged in male births.

The most prevalent and best characterized genetic associations of heterotaxy include:

| Type | OMIM | Gene | Locus |
|---|---|---|---|
| HTX1 | 306955 | ZIC3 | Xq26.2 |
| HTX2 | 605376 | CFC1 | 2q21.1 |
| HTX3 | 606325 | PA26 | 6q21 |
| HTX4 | 613751 | ACVR2B | 3p22.2 |
| HTX5 | 270100 | NODAL | 10q22.1 |
| HTX6 | 614779 | CCDC11 | 18q21.1 |

=== Classical pathology ===
- Cardiac looping malformations:
  - Fallot's tetralogy
  - transposition of the great vessels
  - Ventricular and atrial septal defects.
- Deranged abdominal organ asymmetry:
  - The stomach and spleen are prone to isolated reversal
  - The stomach, liver, and a single adrenal gland are occasionally found in the midline.
- Organ malformations:
  - asplenia and polysplenia often lead to sepsis
  - More rarely, the head of the pancreas fails to form
  - Horseshoe kidneys develop, which can lead to cancer, kidney stones, and/or infection.
- Malrotation errors cause volvulus and/or faulty peritoneal attachments, which completely obstruct the bowel.
- Vascular abnormalities:
  - Interrupted inferior vena cava,
  - Bilateral superior or inferior venae cavae
  - Intrahepatic interruption of the inferior vena cava with connection to the azygos or hemiazygos veins
  - Aberrant portal veins.

=== Bronchial tree and lungs ===
Pathophysiology in the bronchial tree can be observed by radiography. Under normal development, the bronchial tree consists of two main bronchi that are anatomically different:

- Hyparterial bronchus (below the pulmonary artery): supplies blood to the bi-lobed left lung
- Eparterial bronchus (adjacent to the artery): supplies blood to the tri-lobed right lung

In situs ambiguus, there is a duplication of either the hyparterial or eparterial bronchus. These features are not associated with any significant clinical complications. Mechanisms leading to bronchial duplication are not thoroughly understood.

In pulmonary valve stenosis, there is a reduction in blood flow to the lungs due to an obstruction of the heart at the pulmonic valve. This contributes to cyanosis and pulmonary hypertension.

== Diagnosis ==
For proper diagnosis of situs ambiguus, cardiac and non-cardiac features must be evaluated. Diagnostic criteria for atrial isomerism includes observation of symmetry of thoracic visceral organs upon echocardiogram, arrhythmia upon electrocardiogram, and chest x-ray for confirmation of the heart's location across the left-right axis. Additional radiographic and cross-sectional imaging may be obtained to evaluate both cardiac and non-cardiac manifestations of situs ambiguus. In addition, a series of gastrointestinal tests can be conducted for observation of intestinal malrotation, as well as a scan of the liver and spleen for biliary function.

=== Diagnostic techniques for cardiac causes ===
- Echocardiography
- Electrocardiography
- Computed tomography
- Magnetic resonance imaging
- Cardiac catheterization and angiography
- Chest x-ray

=== Diagnostic techniques for non-cardiac causes ===
- Computed tomography
- Magnetic resonance imaging
- Splenic function analysis
- Evaluation of biliary anatomy and cholangiogram
- Evaluation of intestinal malrotation
- Pulse oximeter

=== Other diagnostic features ===
- Assessment of family history
- Genetic testing

== Management ==
Each of the symptoms of situs ambiguus must be managed with appropriate treatment dependent upon the organ system involved. Intestinal malrotation is treated surgically using the Ladd procedure. This procedure widens a fold in the peritoneum so that the intestines can be placed in non-rotated formation. It is not possible to return the bowel to a normal morphology However, 89% of patients that undergo the Ladd surgery experience a complete resolution of symptoms.

Following cholangiogram, a Kasai procedure is usually performed in cases of biliary atresia. In this surgery, a Y-shaped shunt is used to passage bile from the liver directly to the intestine. If this is unsuccessful, liver transplantation can be considered based on the overall health of the patient. The Kasai procedure is successful in approximately 80% of patients. Following the operation, patients are advised to take fat-soluble vitamins, choleretics, and anti-inflammatory medications.

Functionally asplenic patients have an elevated lifetime risk of sepsis, as they have no functional spleen for fighting infection. For this reason, asplenic patients are under constant observation for any signs of fever or infection. In the case of infection, patients are placed on controlled empiric antibiotic therapy to avoid development of antibiotic resistance. This therapy battles infection by both gram-positive and gram-negative bacteria.

Right-atrial and left-atrial isomerism and associated pulmonary issues are treated in a series of steps based on the severity of symptoms. Isomeric patients are first treated by inserting a shunt that will move incoming blood through the pulmonary circuit. The Fontan procedure routes blood through the patient's single ventricle, to the lungs, and into systemic circulation. This process is favorable in patients aged 2 to 5 years old. About 20–30% of patients will require a heart transplant. Left-atrial isomeric patients have less severe complications, as they typically have 2 functional ventricles. In this case, they can undergo biventricular repair to form 2 separate ventricles and functional associated valves.

== Prognosis ==
Prognosis for patients with situs ambiguus is quite varied, owed to the spectrum of clinical manifestations. Infants who experience severe cyanosis at birth may die within hours of delivery if medical intervention is not immediate. Alternatively, longevity of neonates with mild cardiac lesions is unaffected. Ten percent of patients born with right atrial isomerism die by the age of 5 without intervention. Improvements in therapies has increased the 5-year survival to 30–74% for right atrial isomeric patients and 65–84% for left atrial isomeric patients based on the cause of their disease.

== Research ==
There have been vast amounts of research on the clinical features, racial disparities, and physiological mechanisms of heterotaxy syndrome dating back to 1973.

Mishra et al. published a review in November 2015 describing current knowledge of cardiac and non-cardiac abnormalities associated with situs ambiguus. The author stresses the importance of genetic testing prior to deciding a prognosis for affected patients. She also proposes prenatal screening and evaluation in cases at risk for development of situs ambiguus.

Recent studies have shown higher rates of heterotaxy syndrome among Hispanic infants of Mexican descent, as well as female infants of non-Hispanic black and white mothers. Additional studies must be done to clarify the mechanisms behind racial disparities in heterotaxy syndrome. Individuals of Asian descent show a higher prevalence of heterotaxy syndrome in general than members of the Western world.

The National Birth Defects Prevention study (October 2014) attempted to link clinical presentations of situs ambiguus to demographics in an epidemiological study. This proved a difficult task due to the vast differences in presentation of this disorder. However, the authors are hopeful that finding a link can help inform clinical decision-making, predictive analyses, and future outcomes.

== See also ==
- Chirality (mathematics)
- Ivemark syndrome
- Situs inversus
- Situs solitus
