= Dextrocardia =

Atypical heart placement on the right side of the body

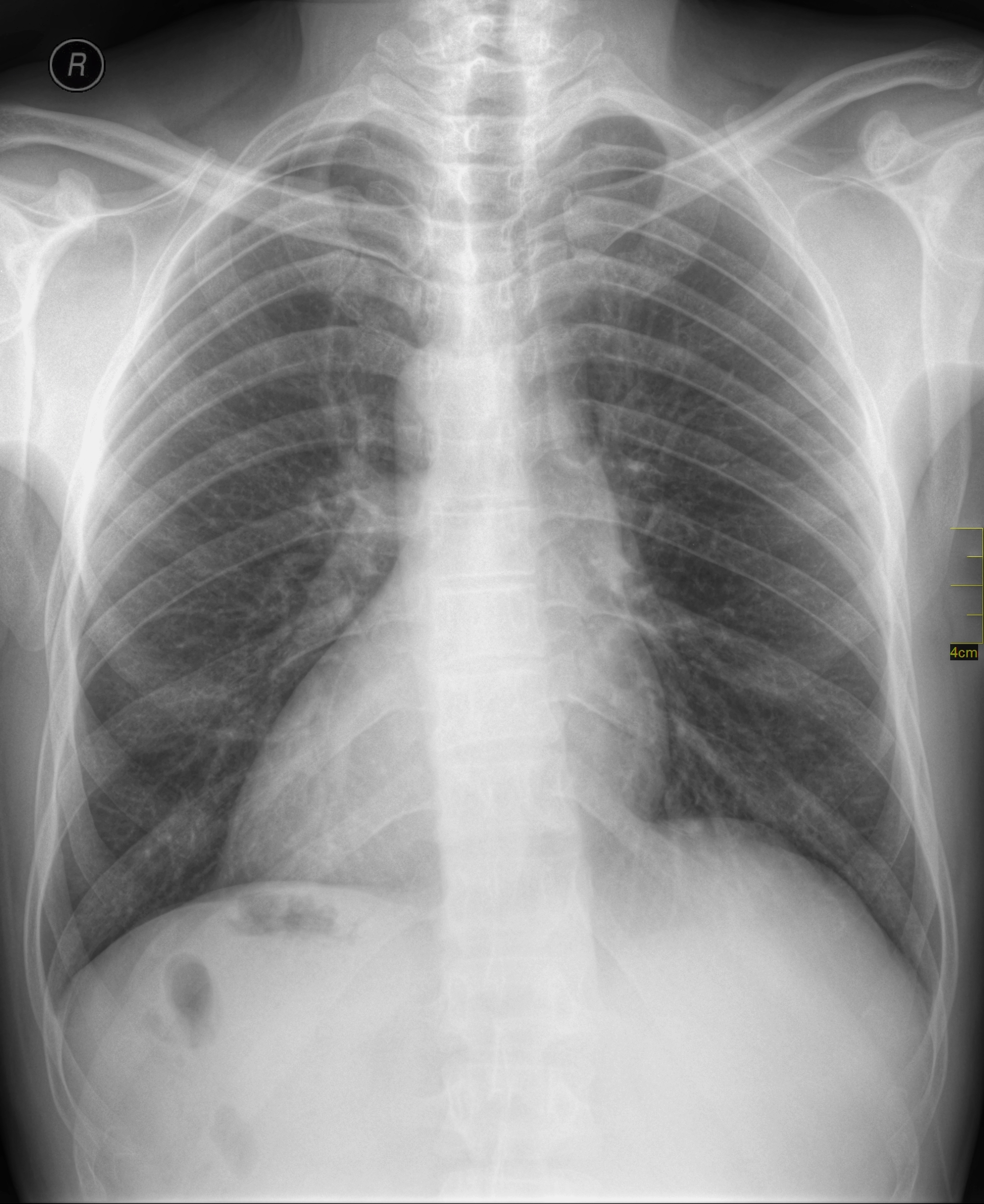
- Chest X ray of a person with dextrocardia situs inversus showing the cardiac apex pointing towards right
- Specialty: Medical genetics

Dextrocardia (from Latin dextro 'right hand side' and Greek kardia 'heart') is a rare congenital condition in which the apex of the heart is located on the right side of the body, rather than the more typical placement towards the left. There are two main types of dextrocardia: dextrocardia of embryonic arrest (also known as isolated dextrocardia) and dextrocardia situs inversus. Dextrocardia situs inversus is further divided.

== Classification ==
=== Dextrocardia of embryonic arrest ===
In this form of dextrocardia, the heart is simply placed further right in the thorax than is normal. It is commonly associated with severe defects of the heart and related abnormalities including pulmonary hypoplasia.

=== Dextrocardia situs solitus ===
Dextrocardia refers to a heart positioned in the right side of the chest. Situs solitus describes viscera that are in the normal position, with the stomach on the left side.

=== Dextrocardia situs inversus ===
Dextrocardia situs inversus refers to the heart being a mirror image situated on the right side. When all visceral organs are mirrored, the term used is dextrocardia situs inversus totalis.

Although statistically people with dextrocardia do not have any medical problems from the disorder, they may be prone to a number of bowel, esophageal, bronchial and cardiovascular disorders (such as double outlet right ventricle, endocardial cushion defect and pulmonary stenosis). Certain cardiovascular and pulmonary disorders related to dextrocardia can be life-threatening if left unchecked.

Kartagener syndrome may also be present in patients with dextrocardia but this must be in the setting of situs inversus and may include male infertility.

=== Dextrocardia with situs ambiguus ===
In contrast to dextrocardia situs inversus which is only rarely associated with congenital heart disease, dextrocardia situs ambiguus is often associated with intracardiac anomalies. Dextrocardia situs ambiguus presents a surgical challenge not per se due to associated cardiac malformation, but because achieving adequate exposure is difficult. Right sided structures such as right atrium, right ventricle and tricuspid valve are oriented posteriorly in dextrocardia situs ambiguus (in contrast to dextrocardia with situs inversus). This presents a challenge to the surgeons operating on the right-sided cardiac structures in a case of dextrocardia situs ambiguus.

== Diagnosis ==
Medical diagnosis of the two forms of congenital dextrocardia can be made by ECG or imaging.

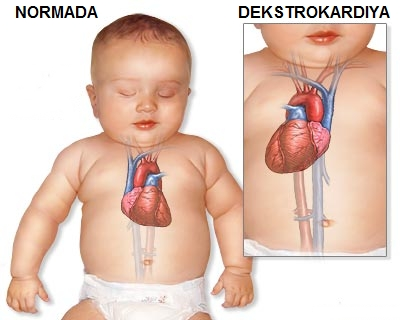
Diagram indicating levocardia (normal position) and dextrocardia

=== Technical dextrocardia ===
Technical dextrocardia refers to an ECG reading that has no basis in the patient's anatomy. This apparent presentation is typically caused by the accidental lead placement of the left and right arm electrodes. Usually, this would show as an extreme axis deviation.

== Management ==
ECG leads must be placed in reversed positions on a person with dextrocardia. In addition, when defibrillating someone with dextrocardia, the pads should be placed in reverse positions. That is, instead of upper right and lower left, pads should be placed upper left and lower right.

When heart transplantation is required in a person with situs inversus, reconstruction of the venous pathways to accommodate a normal donor heart is a major, but not insurmountable, challenge.

== Epidemiology ==
Dextrocardia is estimated to occur in approximately 1 in 12,019 pregnancies.

A Japanese study of 1,753 fetal cardiac echocardiograms over five years revealed only two cases.
