= Situs inversus =

Condition in which organs are reversed

- Other names: Situs transversus; oppositus
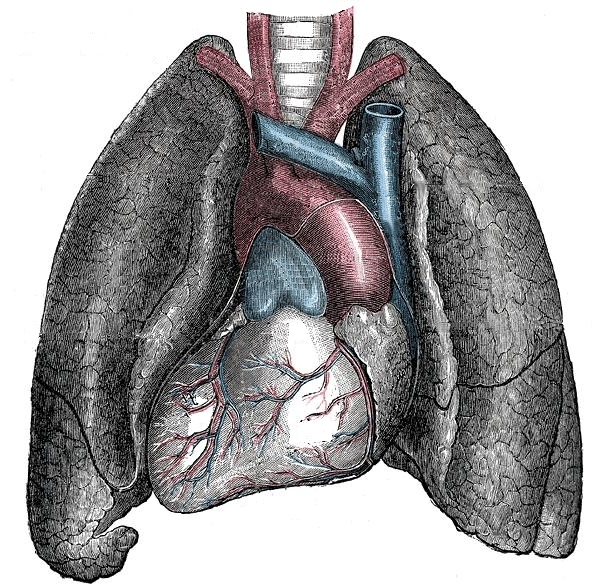
- Situs inversus causes the positions of the heart and lungs to be mirrored.
- Specialty: Medical genetics
- Causes: Genes
- Frequency: 0.01%

Situs inversus is a congenital condition in which the major visceral organs are reversed or mirrored from their normal positions. The normal arrangement of internal organs is known as situs solitus. Many people with situs inversus have no medical symptoms resulting from the condition, although cardiac problems are the most common complication. Until the advent of modern medicine, it was usually undiagnosed.

It is found in about 0.01% of the population (1 in 10,000 people). Most commonly, it involves complete transposition (right to left reversal) of all of the viscera, known as situs inversus totalis. The heart is not in its usual position in the left chest, but is on the right, a condition known as dextrocardia (lit. 'right-hearted'). Because the relationship between the organs is not changed, most people with situs inversus have no associated medical symptoms or complications.

An uncommon form of situs inversus is isolated levocardia, in which the position of the heart is not mirrored alongside the other organs. Isolated levocardia carries a risk of heart defects, and so patients with the condition may require surgery to correct them.

In rarer cases, such as situs ambiguus or heterotaxy, situs cannot be determined. In these patients, the liver may be midline, the spleen absent or multiple, and the bowel malrotated. Often, structures are duplicated or absent altogether. This is more likely to cause medical problems than situs inversus totalis.

== Signs and symptoms ==
In the absence of congenital heart defects, individuals with situs inversus are homeostatically normal, and can live standard healthy lives without any complications related to their medical condition. There is a 5–10% prevalence of congenital heart disease in individuals with situs inversus totalis, most commonly transposition of the great vessels. The incidence of congenital heart disease is 95% in situs inversus with levocardia.

Many people with situs inversus totalis are unaware of their unusual anatomy until they seek medical attention for an unrelated condition, such as a rib fracture or a bout of appendicitis. The condition may also be discovered during the administration of certain medicines or during tests such as a barium meal or enema. The reversal of the organs may then lead to some confusion, as many signs and symptoms will be on the atypical side. For example, if an individual with situs inversus develops appendicitis, they will present to the physician with lower left abdominal pain, since that is where their appendix lies. (Note: Intestinal malrotation can also cause the appendix to be on the left side.) Thus, in the event of a medical problem, the knowledge that the individual has situs inversus can expedite diagnosis. People with this rare condition should inform their doctors before an examination, so the doctor can redirect their search for heart sounds and other signs. Wearing a medical identification tag can help inform health care providers in the event the person is unable to communicate.

Situs inversus also complicates organ transplantation operations as donor organs will more likely come from situs solitus (normal) donors. As hearts and livers are chiral, geometric problems arise in placing an organ into a cavity shaped in the mirror image. For example, a person who requires a heart transplant needs all their great vessels reattached to the donor heart. However, the orientation of these vessels in a person with situs inversus is reversed, necessitating steps so that the blood vessels join properly.

== Cause ==
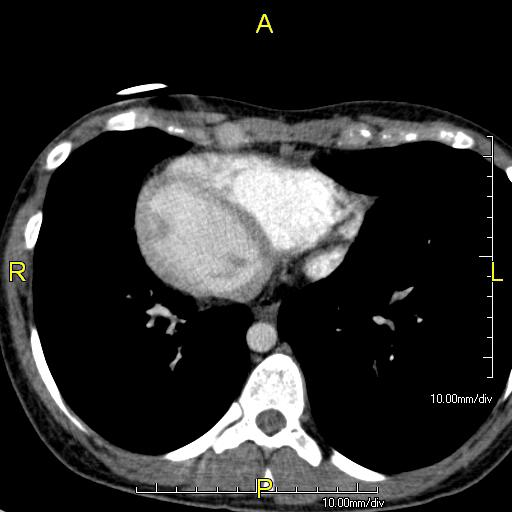
Axial CT image showing dextrocardia and situs inversus in a patient with Kartagener syndrome.

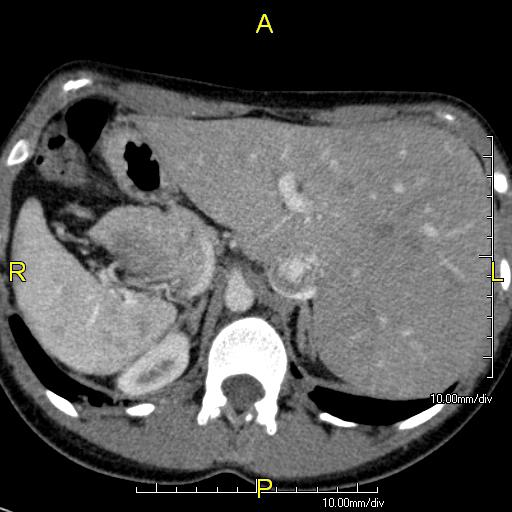
Axial CT image showing situs inversus (liver and IVC on the left, spleen and aorta on the right) in a patient with Kartagener syndrome.

Situs inversus has an autosomal recessive pattern of inheritance.

Situs inversus is generally an autosomal recessive genetic condition, although it can be X-linked or found in identical "mirror image" twins.

About 25% of individuals with situs inversus have an underlying condition known as primary ciliary dyskinesia (PCD). PCD is a dysfunction of the cilia that occurs during early embryonic development. Normally functioning cilia determine the position of the internal organs during early development, and so embryos with PCD have a 50% chance of developing situs inversus. If they do, they are said to have Kartagener syndrome, characterized by the triad of situs inversus, chronic sinusitis, and bronchiectasis. Cilia are also responsible for clearing mucus from the lung, and the dysfunction causes increased susceptibility to lung infections. Kartagener syndrome can also manifest with male infertility as functional cilia are required for proper sperm flagella function.

A marked increase in cases was observed several months after the lifting of the zero-COVID-19 policy in China, which coincided with a rise in SARS-CoV-2 infections. This rare clinical evidence suggests a possible link between infection during pregnancy and the development of situs inversus in the fetus, specifically during gestational weeks 4–6, the critical period for organ positioning.

== Effect on anatomy ==
The condition affects all major structures within the thorax and abdomen. Generally, the organs are simply transposed through the sagittal plane. The heart is located on the right side of the thorax, the stomach and spleen on the right side of the abdomen, and the liver and gall bladder on the left side. The heart's normal right atrium occurs on the left, and the left atrium is on the right. The lung anatomy is reversed, and the left lung has three lobes while the right lung has two lobes. The intestines and other internal structures are also reversed from the normal, and the blood vessels, nerves, and lymphatics are also transposed.

If the heart is swapped to the right side of the thorax, it is known as "situs inversus with dextrocardia" or "situs inversus totalis". If the heart remains on the normal left side of the thorax, a much rarer condition (1 in 2,000,000 of the general population), it is known as "situs inversus with levocardia or "situs inversus incompletus".

Situs inversus of the optic disc may occur unilaterally or bilaterally, associated with reduced binocularity and stereoacuity resembling monofixation syndrome. It is characterized by the emergence of the retinal vessels in an anomalous direction (from the nasal rather than the temporal aspect) with dysversion (tilt) of the optic disc.

Research into handedness among individuals with situs inversus has yielded conflicting results. Research from 2004 indicated that the prevalence of left-handedness in those individuals with situs inversus and primary ciliary dyskinesia was not significantly different from the general population with situs solitus. However, more recent research published in 2023 reported a significant increase in left-handedness, finding that 26% of individuals with situs inversus were left-handed, a rate much higher than the 10.6% typically observed in the general population.

== Diagnosis ==
Diagnosis of situs inversus can be made using imaging techniques such as X-ray, ultrasound, CT scan, and magnetic resonance imaging (MRI).

Any potential treatment would involve a complete and highly invasive surgical rearrangement of the internal viscera of the patient. Such a procedure is unnecessary, given that situs inversus rarely causes any additional symptoms. No treatment, medical or surgical, is prescribed for situs inversus individuals, with medical professionals instead treating any other symptoms the patient may have with awareness of the unique anatomy of the patient.

== Occurrence ==
Situs inversus is rare, affecting 0.01% of the population.

== History ==
Dextrocardia (the heart being located on the right side of the thorax) was seen and drawn by Leonardo da Vinci, and then recognised by Marco Aurelio Severino in 1643. Situs inversus was first described more than a century later by Matthew Baillie.

== Etymology ==
The term situs inversus is a short form of the Latin phrase situs inversus viscerum, meaning "inverted position of the internal organs".

== Notable cases ==
Notable individuals with documented cases of situs inversus include:

- Enrique Iglesias (b. 1975), Spanish singer, songwriter, actor and record producer.
- Donny Osmond (b. 1957), US singer, songwriter, actor, television host, dancer.
- Catherine O'Hara (1954–2026), Canadian-American actress, writer, and comedian.
- Randy Foye (b. 1983), American former professional basketball player in the NBA. He has suffered no discernible complications, and the condition did not affect his career as a professional athlete, as all his organs are in reverse.
- Ginggaew Lorsoungnern (1950–1979), Thai convict executed by firing squad. Her condition was discovered after she was shot in the left side of her chest and survived. After waking up in the morgue she was taken back and executed.
- Tim Miller (b. 1951), director of the Ashtanga Yoga Center in Carlsbad, California.
- Rose Marie Bentley (1918–2017 or 2018), Molalla, Oregon woman who unknowingly had the rare variant situs inversus with levocardia, and lived to 99 years without any complications. She donated her body to Oregon Health & Science University, where her condition was discovered during an anatomy class after students noticed the unusual arrangement of her heart's blood vessels, prompting further investigation of the cadaver.

== See also ==
- Asplenia
- Chirality (mathematics)
- Ectopia cordis
- Johann Friedrich Meckel, the Elder
- Polysplenia
