= ATP phosphohydrolase =

ATP phosphohydrolase may refer to:

- ATP phosphohydrolase (steroid-exporting), a set index article, including:
  - Steroid-transporting ATPase, an enzyme
  - Xenobiotic-transporting ATPase, an enzyme
- Myosin ATPase, an enzyme
- Dynein ATPase, an enzyme
- Chaperonin ATPase, an enzyme
- Non-chaperonin molecular chaperone ATPase, an enzyme
- DNA helicase, an enzyme
