= Evolution of molecular chaperones =

Chaperones, also called molecular chaperones, are proteins that assist other proteins in assuming their three-dimensional fold, which is necessary for protein function. However, the fold of a protein is sensitive to environmental conditions, such as temperature and pH, and thus chaperones are needed to keep proteins in their functional fold across various environmental conditions. Chaperones are an integral part of a cell's protein quality control network by assisting in protein folding and are ubiquitous across diverse biological taxa. Since protein folding, and therefore protein function, is susceptible to environmental conditions, chaperones could represent an important cellular aspect of biodiversity and environmental tolerance by organisms living in hazardous conditions. Chaperones also affect the evolution of proteins in general, as many proteins fundamentally require chaperones to fold or are naturally prone to misfolding, and therefore mitigates protein aggregation.

== Evolution of chaperones ==
The evolutionary development of chaperones is highly linked to the evolution of proteins in general, as their primary function is dependent on the presence of proteins. Proteins were selected as the main biological catalysts over ribozymes, RNA molecules capable of catalyzing biological reactions, early in cellular evolution. Diversity of monomers (4 nucleotides versus 20 amino acids), interactions during folding, and consequences of changes in sequence are some of the hypotheses that attempt to explain why proteins were selected over ribozymes.

Small proteins fold spontaneously, but the development of increasingly larger proteins, which have more complex folding patterns and intramolecular interactions, would have required chaperones to prevent protein aggregation due to misfolding. Folding of early proteins would have been error-prone in ancient cell cytosol and chaperones would have been needed to assist in unfolding and re-folding.

== Heat shock proteins ==
Heat shock proteins (HSPs) are a diverse class of molecular chaperones that assist in folding under stress. While originally identified in heat stress response (hence the name "heat shock"), inducible HSP expression is a consequence of all known stressors (pH, osmotic, temperature, energy depletion, ion concentration, etc.). Genetic stress, a result of deleterious mutations, also increases HSP expression. HSPs are ubiquitous across all domains of life (Bacteria, Archaea, and Eukarya) and have been found in every species for which they have been tested. HSPs are divided into families, based on sequence homology and molecular weight (hsp110, hsp100, hsp90, hsp70, hsp60, hsp40, hsp10, and small hsp families).

Proteins are highly susceptible to denaturation due to environmental conditions and organisms that live in hazardous conditions should have a basal level of HSP expression. However, other adaptations, such as colonizing less hazardous microhabitats or other behavioral adaptations, could also contribute to acclimation in stressful habitats. Additionally, "normal" environments can also place stress on inhabitants (drought or seasonal changes, for example). These factors muddy the relationship between HSP expression and environmental stress resistance and HSP expression in nature is not well characterized.

Elevated expression of heat shock proteins is not correlated with chronic environmental stress and is thought to be due to the costs of HSP expression. High levels of hsp70 are known to accompany deficits in cell division, reproduction, and reproductive success. Intracellularly, HSP expression shuts down normal cell functions and diverts a large amount of energy for stress resistance. Additionally, high levels of HSP is hypothesized to be toxic due to disruption of cell functions, possibly by excessive binding of client proteins. These results suggest that the costs of HSP expression are more suited to temporary stressors.

== Chaperone buffering ==
Chaperones have also been implicated in the understanding the relationship between genotype and phenotype. Protein folding in itself transitions from genotype to phenotype: primary structure/amino acid sequence reflects genotype while the final, functional fold, either tertiary or quaternary structure, represents phenotype. Since chaperones are mediators of this transition by assisting in the fold of the client protein, chaperone activity is thought to modulate the adaptive evolution of the proteome.

One observation in line with this hypothesis is chaperone buffering, where the activity of a chaperone masks or "buffers" deleterious or destabilizing mutations in a client protein. In Drosophila melanogaster, reduced activity of hsp90 resulted in deficient phenotypes caused by mutations in developmental pathways. Hsp70 in Drosophila was also shown to buffer deleterious mutations. Similar results have been shown in Saccharomyces cerevisiae and Arabidopsis thaliana. Work in Escherichia coli showed that the GroES/GroEL system (aka hsp10 and hsp60 respectively) similarly buffered the effect of destabilizing mutations in a phosphotriesterase. The mutation disrupted the fold of the protein, but conferred an increase in efficiency upon chaperone-assisted folding. These results illustrate a model in which evolution can act on the phenotype of a protein while the deleterious effect of the genotype is mitigated by chaperones.

== Chaperones and the endosymbiosis theory ==
Chaperones are ancient proteins that have been evolutionarily conserved across all domains of life and are ubiquitous across all biological taxa. Since they are so widespread and ancient, they can be used as molecular markers in studies of ancient cellular evolution.

Phylogenetic analysis using two families of HSPs (hsp10 and hsp60, also called chaperonins) support the current endosymbiosis model of the origin of mitochondria and chloroplasts. Hsp10 and hsp60 are present in all eubacteria and organelles of eukaryotes (mitochondria and chloroplasts), but not in eukaryotic cell cytosol and archaebacteria. Phylogenetic trees were generated using 56 total amino acid sequences from Gram positive and Gram negative bacteria; mitochondria from plants, animals, fungi, and protists; cyanobacteria; and chloroplasts. Any two hsp60 amino acid sequences share at least 40% similarity, with 18-20% of differences coming from conservative changes (uncharged amino acid to another uncharged amino acid). Any two hsp10 amino acid sequences share at least 30% similarity, with 15-20% conservative changes. Phylogenetic analysis using hsp10 and hsp60 yield similar results to that of rRNA and other genes. Mitochondria were found to be most closely related to the α-purple subdivision of Gram negative bacteria and chloroplasts were most similar to cyanobacteria, similar to other data supporting the endosymbiosis theory. Gram positive bacteria were found to be the most ancestral, which is also supported by other studies.
