= Chaperonin =

Family of heat shock proteins

Chaperonins
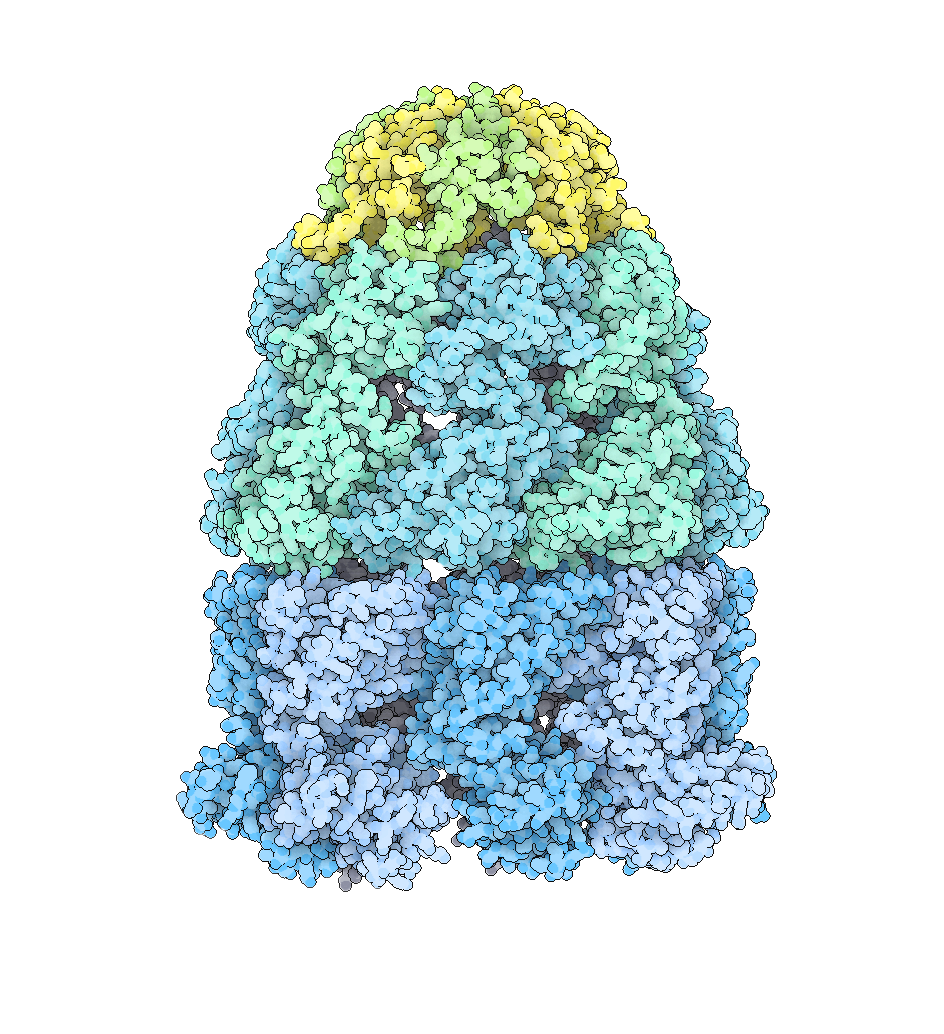
- Cryo-EM structure of the H. thermophilus GroEL-GroES bullet complex. (PDB: 8WUX)

Identifiers
- Symbol: Cpn60_TCP1
- Pfam: PF00118
- InterPro: IPR002423
- PROSITE: PDOC00610
- CATH: 5GW5
- SCOP2: 1grl / SCOPe / SUPFAM
- CDD: cd00309
Available protein structures:
- PDB: 1sx3K:23-525 1kpoZ:23-525 1fyaA:190-375 1gruH:23-525 1xckF:23-525 1kp8E:23-525 1pcqJ:23-524 1aonJ:23-524 1mnfI:23-525 1svtJ:23-524 2c7dK:23-525 1dkdC:190-335 1j4zL:23-525 1oelE:23-524 2c7cH:23-525 1gr5H:23-525 1sx4E:23-524 1kid :190-375 1gr6F:23-525 1ss8B:23-524 1fy9A:190-375 1dk7A:190-335 1jon :190-335 1la1A:187-378 1iokA:23-526 1wf4e:22-526 1we3E:22-526 1sjpB:42-522 1srvA:1-143 1a6dB:33-521 1a6eB:33-521 1e0rB:215-366 1ass :214-364 1asx :214-364 1gn1H:210-380 1gmlB:210-380 IPR002423 PF00118 (ECOD; PDBsum)
- AlphaFold: IPR002423; PF00118

Chaperonins, abbreviated Cpn, Cpn60, or HSP60, are a family of heat shock proteins that assist in the folding of newly synthesized proteins and refolding of misfolded proteins during stressful conditions such as high temperature. They are protein complexes consisting of about 16 protein subunits of ~60 kDa each. Chaperonins belong to a large class of molecules and complexes that assist protein folding, called molecular chaperones.

Newly made proteins usually must fold from a linear chain of amino acids into a three-dimensional tertiary structure. The energy to fold proteins is supplied by non-covalent interactions between the amino acid side chains of each protein, and by solvent effects. Most proteins spontaneously fold into their most stable three-dimensional conformation, which is usually also their functional conformation, but occasionally proteins mis-fold. Molecular chaperones catalyze protein refolding by accelerating partial unfolding of misfolded proteins, aided by energy supplied by the hydrolysis of adenosine triphosphate (ATP). Chaperonin proteins may also tag misfolded proteins to be degraded.

== Structure ==
The structure of these chaperonins resemble two donuts stacked on top of one another to create a barrel. Each ring is composed of either 7, 8 or 9 subunits depending on the organism in which the chaperonin is found. Each ~60kDa peptide chain can be divided into three domains, apical, intermediate, and equatorial.

The original chaperonin is proposed to have evolved from a peroxiredoxin.

== Classification ==
=== Group I ===
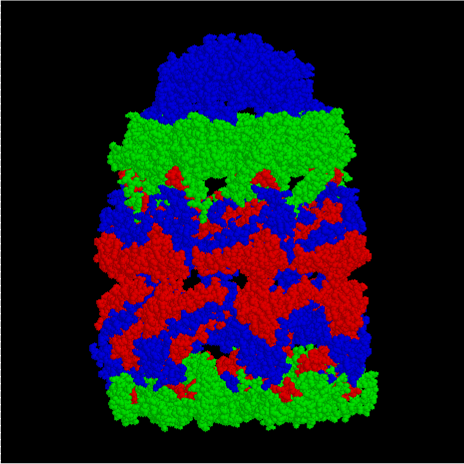
GroES/GroEL complex (side)

Group I chaperonins (Cpn60) (Note: The GroEL family is referred to, by InterPro, as Cpn60. However, CDD uses Cpn60 to refer to the Group II proteins in archaea.) are found in bacteria as well as organelles of endosymbiotic origin: chloroplasts and mitochondria.

The GroEL/GroES complex in E. coli is a Group I chaperonin and the best characterized large (~ 1 MDa) chaperonin complex.

- GroEL is a double-ring 14mer with a greasy hydrophobic patch at its opening and can accommodate the native folding of substrates 15-60 kDa in size.
- GroES (is a single-ring heptamer that binds to GroEL in the presence of ATP or transition state analogues of ATP hydrolysis, such as ADP-AlF_{3}. It is like a cover that covers GroEL (box/bottle).

GroEL/GroES may not be able to undo protein aggregates, but kinetically it competes in the pathway of misfolding and aggregation, thereby preventing aggregate formation.

The Cpn60 subfamily was discovered in 1988. It was sequenced in 1992. The cpn10 and cpn60 oligomers also require Mg^{2+}-ATP in order to interact to form a functional complex. The binding of cpn10 to cpn60 inhibits the weak ATPase activity of cpn60.

The RuBisCO subunit binding protein is a member of this family. The crystal structure of Escherichia coli GroEL has been resolved to 2.8 Å.

Some bacteria use multiple copies of this chaperonin, probably for different peptides.

=== Group II ===
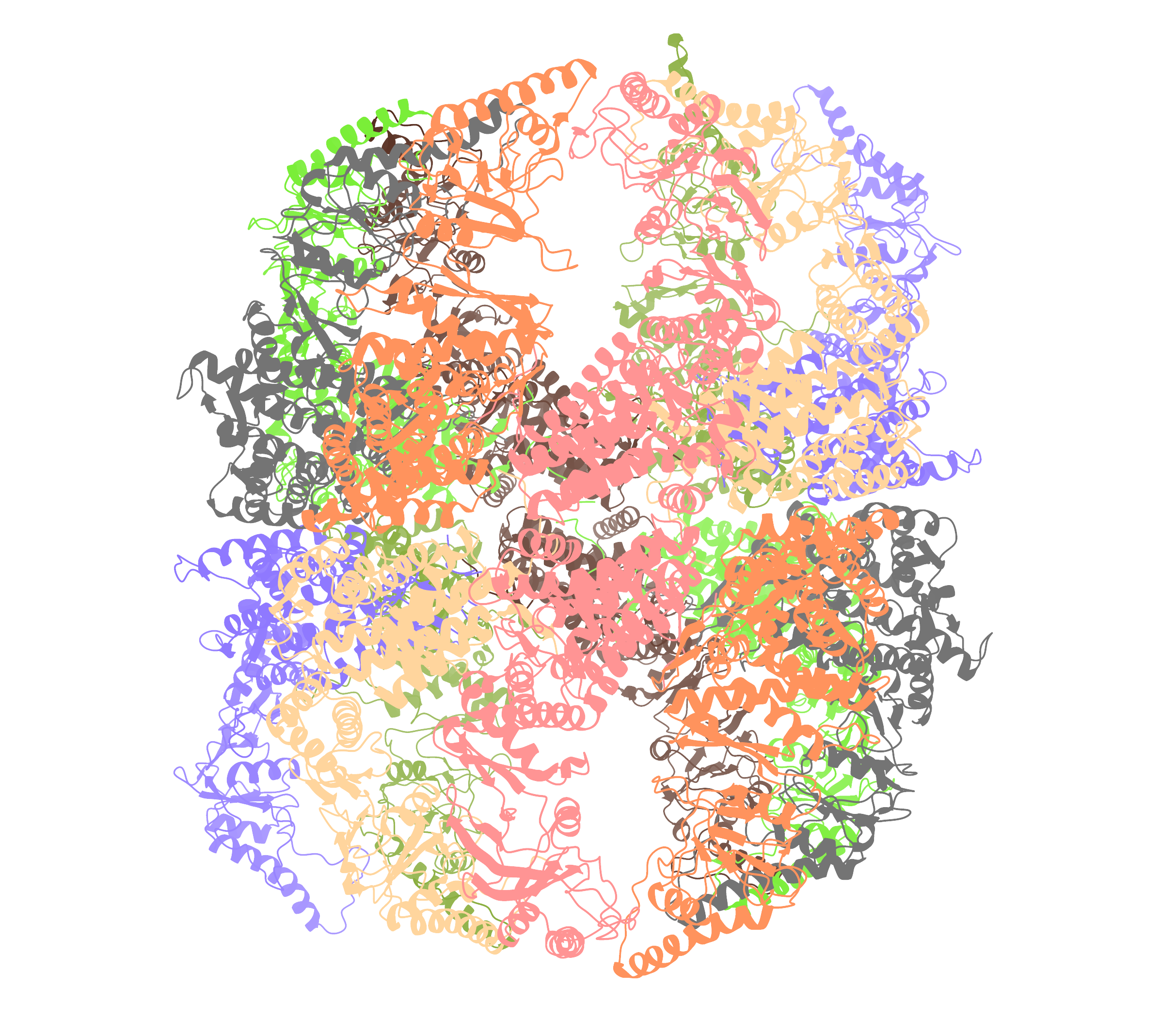
Structure of Saccharomyces cerevisiae TRiC in the AMP-PNP bound state (PDB: 5GW5).

Group II chaperonins (TCP-1), found in the eukaryotic cytosol and in archaea, are more poorly characterized.

- The complex in archaea is called the thermosome. A homo-16mer in some archaea, it is regarded as the prototypical type II chaperonin. (Note: Some archaeons have evolved to use, like eukaryotes, different subunits. Methanosarcina acetivorans is known to have five types of subunits. The ancestor to eukarotic TriC is thought to have two.)
- TRiC, the eukaryotic chaperonin, is composed of two rings of eight different though related subunits, each thought to be represented once per eight-membered ring. TRiC was originally thought to fold only the cytoskeletal proteins actin and tubulin but is now known to fold dozens of substrates.

Methanococcus maripaludis chaperonin (Mm cpn) is composed of sixteen identical subunits (eight per ring). It has been shown to fold the mitochondrial protein rhodanese; however, no natural substrates have yet been identified.

Group II chaperonins are not thought to utilize a GroES-type cofactor to fold their substrates. They instead contain a "built-in" lid that closes in an ATP-dependent manner to encapsulate its substrates, a process that is required for optimal protein folding activity. They also interact with a co-chaperone, prefoldin, that helps move the substrate in.

=== Other families ===
Group III includes some bacterial Cpns that are related to Group II. They have a lid, but the lid opening is noncooperative in them. They are thought to be an ancient relative of Group II.

A Group I chaperonin gp146 from phage EL does not use a lid, and its donut interface is more similar to Group II. It might represent another ancient type of chaperonin.

== Mechanism of action ==
Chaperonins undergo large conformational changes during a folding reaction as a function of the enzymatic hydrolysis of ATP as well as binding of substrate proteins and cochaperonins, such as GroES. These conformational changes allow the chaperonin to bind an unfolded or misfolded protein, encapsulate that protein within one of the cavities formed by the two rings, and release the protein back into solution. Upon release, the substrate protein will either be folded or will require further rounds of folding, in which case it can again be bound by a chaperonin.

The exact mechanism by which chaperonins facilitate folding of substrate proteins is unknown. According to recent analyses by different experimental techniques, GroEL-bound substrate proteins populate an ensemble of compact and locally expanded states that lack stable tertiary interactions. A number of models of chaperonin action have been proposed, which generally focus on two (not mutually exclusive) roles of chaperonin interior: passive and active. Passive models treat the chaperonin cage as an inert form, exerting influence by reducing the conformational space accessible to a protein substrate or preventing intermolecular interactions e.g. by aggregation prevention. The active chaperonin role is in turn involved with specific chaperonin–substrate interactions that may be coupled to conformational rearrangements of the chaperonin.

Probably the most popular model of the chaperonin active role is the iterative annealing mechanism (IAM), which focuses on the effect of iterative, and hydrophobic in nature, binding of the protein substrate to the chaperonin. According to computational simulation studies, the IAM leads to more productive folding by unfolding the substrate from misfolded conformations or by prevention from protein misfolding through changing the folding pathway.

== Conservation of structural and functional homology ==
As mentioned, all cells contain chaperonins.

- In bacteria, the archetype is the well-characterized chaperonin GroEL from E. coli.
- In archaea, the chaperonin is called the thermosome.
- In eukarya, the cytoplasmic chaperonin is called CCT (also called TRiC).

These protein complexes appear to be essential for life in E. coli, Saccharomyces cerevisiae and higher eukaryotes. While there are differences between eukaryotic, bacterial and archaeal chaperonins, the general structure and mechanism are conserved.

=== Bacteriophage T4 morphogenesis ===
The gene product 31 (gp31) of bacteriophage T4 is a protein required for bacteriophage morphogenesis that acts catalytically rather than being incorporated into the bacteriophage structure. The bacterium E. coli is the host for bacteriophage T4. The bacteriophage encoded gp31 protein appears to be homologous to the E. coli cochaperonin protein GroES and is able to substitute for it in the assembly of phage T4 virions during infection. Like GroES, gp31 forms a stable complex with GroEL chaperonin that is absolutely necessary for the folding and assembly in vivo of the bacteriophage T4 major capsid protein gp23.

The main reason for the phage to need its own GroES homolog is that the gp23 protein is too large to fit into a conventional GroES cage. gp31 has longer loops that create a taller container.

== Clinical significance ==
Human GroEL is the immunodominant antigen of patients with Legionnaire's disease, and is thought to play a role in the protection of the Legionella bacteria from oxygen radicals within macrophages. This hypothesis is based on the finding that the cpn60 gene is upregulated in response to hydrogen peroxide, a source of oxygen radicals. Cpn60 has also been found to display strong antigenicity in many bacterial species and has the potential for inducing immune protection against unrelated bacterial infections.

== Examples ==
Human genes encoding proteins containing this domain include:

- BBS10
- CCT1; CCT2; CCT3; CCT4; CCT5; CCT6A; CCT6B; CCT7; CCT8
- CESK1
- HSPD1
- KCNMB3L
- CCT8L1; LOC401329
- MKKS
- PIP5K3

== See also ==
- Chaperone
- Heat shock protein
- Arthur L. Horwich
