= CIROZ =

Protein-coding gene in humans

Identifiers
- Aliases: CIROZ, chromosome 1 open reading frame 127, C1orf127, Ciliated Left-Right Organizer Protein Containing ZP-N Domains, FLJ37118, HTX14
- External IDs: MGI: 2685418; GeneCards: CIROZ

Gene location (Human)
Chr.	Chromosome 1 (human)
Band	1p36.22	Start	10,946,471 bp
Band	1p36.22	End	10,982,037 bp

Gene location (Mouse)
Chr.	Chromosome 4 (mouse)
Band	4|4 E2	Start	148,727,774 bp
Band	4|4 E2	End	148,756,029 bp
RNA expression pattern
Bgee	Human / Mouse (ortholog); Top expressed in: gonad; islet of Langerhans; muscle of thigh; gastrocnemius muscle; testicle; skeletal muscle tissue; body of pancreas; apex of heart; monocyte; right hemisphere of cerebellum / Top expressed in: islet of Langerhans; skeletal muscle tissue; quadriceps femoris muscle; muscle of thigh; primary oocyte; secondary oocyte; zygote; lip; esophagus; zone of skin; More reference expression data
BioGPS	n/a
Orthologs
Databases	NCBI: entry; OMA: entry
Species	Human	Mouse
Entrez	148345	230909
Ensembl	ENSG00000175262	ENSMUSG00000070577
UniProt	Q8N9H9	B1ARY8
RefSeq (mRNA)	NM_001170754; NM_173507; NM_001366227	NM_001085505; NM_001368835
RefSeq (protein)	NP_001164225; NP_001353156	NP_001078974; NP_001355764
Location (UCSC)	Chr 1: 10.95 – 10.98 Mb	Chr 4: 148.73 – 148.76 Mb
PubMed search
- Wikidata
View/Edit Human	View/Edit Mouse

Ciliated left-right organizer ZP-N domains-containing protein is a protein which in humans is encoded by the gene CIROZ (previously C1orf127). It is involved in the development of the heart and in particular the process of establishing left-right asymmetry. Related to this, genetic mutations in humans have been associated with this process getting disrupted (called situs ambiguus), often including inborn heart defects.

It has become a non-functional pseudogene in certain non-human animals including birds and reptiles.

== Gene ==
CIROZ is located on the short arm of Chromosome 1 (1p36.22), spanning 35,566 base pairs from 10946471 to 10982037. It is oriented on the minus strand of the chromosome.

== mRNA ==
The primary assembly has 13 exons, and yields an 823 amino acid protein product. There are two known isoforms caused by alternative splicing.

== Protein ==
The CIROZ protein is a member of the Ensembl protein family TF607005. The primary assembly weighs 89 kDa with an isoelectric point of 5.54, making it both longer and heavier than the average protein.

=== Domains and Motifs ===
CIROZ contains two protein domains: DUF4556 and PHA03247, a domain in the Atrophin-1 superfamily. The functions of both domains are unknown. The protein also appears to have a cleavable signal peptide from Met1 to Pro18.

=== Subcellular Localization ===
The CIROZ protein is suggested to be localized to the extracellular matrix in humans.

==== Protein-Protein Interactions ====
CIROZ is suggested to interact with a few different proteins, including CCT3, a molecular chaperone, and CCT6B, also a molecular chaperone found in the testis.

== Expression ==
CIROZ is not constitutively expressed, but it is expressed at low to medium levels in a variety of tissues. Greatest expression is observed in the stomach and pancreas. It is also thought to be expressed in certain areas of both the developing and adult brain, such as the cerebellum, as well as skeletal muscle tissue, the testis, cardiac muscle, and throughout the digestive system.

Little else is known about this gene's expression, however a 2012 paper published in the World Journal of Gastroenterology suggested that its mis-expression could be used as a diagnostic marker locus in the detection of cancer
