= Thermosome =

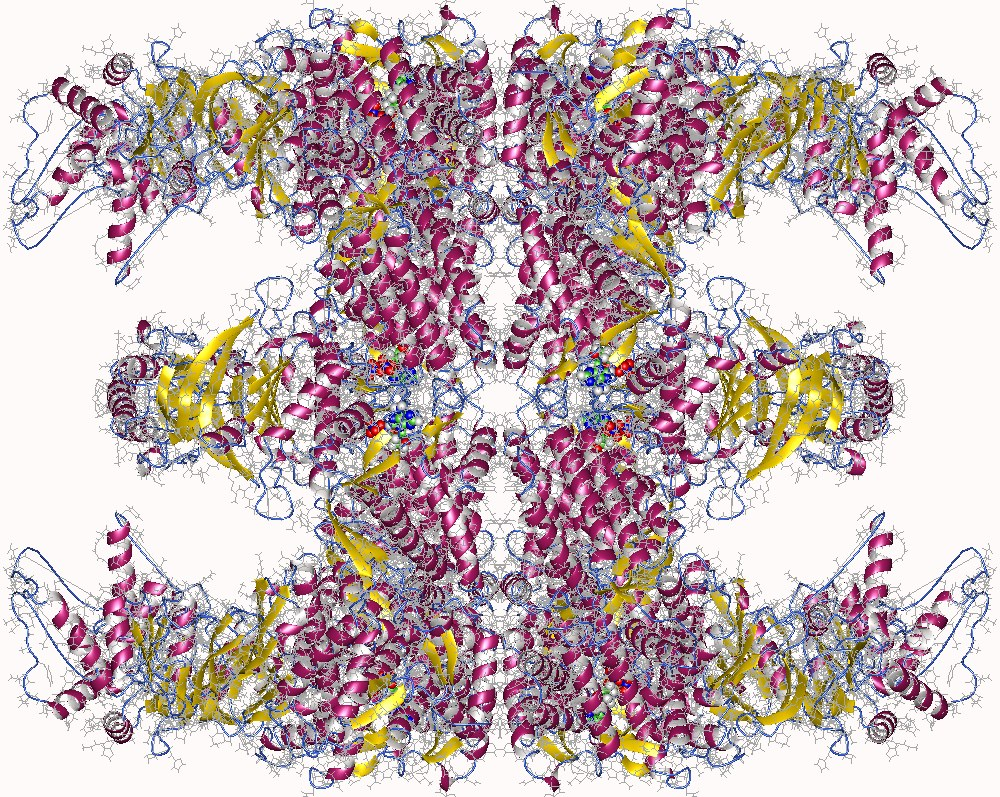
Thermosome hetero16mer, Sulfolobus solfataricus.

A thermosome is a group II chaperonin protein complex that functions in archaea. It is the homolog of eukaryotic CCT. This group II chaperonin is an ATP-dependent chaperonin that is responsible for folding or refolding of incipient or denatured proteins. A thermosome has two rings, each consisting of eight subunits, stacked together to form a cylindrical shape with a large cavity at the center. The thermosome is also defined by its heterooligomeric nature. The complex consists of two subunits that alternate location within its two rings.

Being a Group II chaperonin, the thermosome has a similar structure to group I chaperonins. The main difference, however, lies in the existence of a helical protrusion in the thermosome which composes of a built-in lid of the hydrophilic cavity. Not only is thermosome ATP-dependent, but the mechanism in which thermosome shifts from open to close conformation is also temperature-dependent. The open conformation of the ATP-thermosome exists mainly at low temperatures. Whereas, the closed conformation of the thermosome occurs when heating to physiological temperature.

Similar to the GroEL chaperonins in bacteria, the thermosome shows negative cooperativity since the two rings of the thermosome show different affinities for the binding of ATP. However, unlike the GroEL system, the thermosome is less affected by the concentration of ATP. In the absence of ATP, the thermosome does not have a preference for the T-state over the R-state. There is, however, an inhibition for the loading of the second ring when ADP is bound to the first ring.

The N-terminus and C-terminus of thermosomes are arranged in an anti-parallel fashion and their interactions form part of the intra-ring interactions. Both the N-terminus and C-terminus of the thermosome have charged residues which interact with each other to contribute to the thermal stability of the thermosome. The cpn-α and cpn-β thermosomes specifically show maximum thermal stability in the pH range of 7.0 to 8.0 because this is the range where the charged N- and C-termini residues have net charges close to zero. Under lower or high pH conditions, these residues are charged and repelled each other which negatively affect thermal stability. This shows one possible way in which pH affects the stability of the thermosome.
