= Heat shock protein =

Family of proteins

Heat shock proteins (HSPs) are a family of proteins produced by cells in response to exposure to a stressor. They were first described in relation to the heat shock response, but are now known to also be expressed during other stresses including exposure to cold, UV light and during wound healing or tissue remodeling. Many members of this group perform chaperone functions by stabilizing new proteins to ensure correct folding or by helping to refold proteins that were damaged by the cell stress. This increase in expression is transcriptionally regulated. The dramatic upregulation of the heat shock proteins is a key part of the heat shock response and is induced primarily by heat shock factor (HSF). HSPs are found in virtually all living organisms, from bacteria to humans.

Heat shock proteins are named according to their molecular weight. For example, Hsp60, Hsp70 and Hsp90 (the most widely studied HSPs) refer to families of heat shock proteins on the order of 60, 70 and 90 kilodaltons in size, respectively. The small 8-kilodalton protein ubiquitin, which marks proteins for degradation, also has features of a heat shock protein. A conserved protein binding domain of approximately 80 amino-acid alpha crystallins are known as small heat shock proteins (sHSP).

== Discovery ==
It is known that rapid heat hardening can be elicited by a brief exposure of cells to sub-lethal high temperature, which in turn provides protection from subsequent and more severe temperature. In 1962, Italian geneticist Ferruccio Ritossa reported that heat and the metabolic uncoupler 2,4-dinitrophenol induced a characteristic pattern of "puffing" in the chromosomes of Drosophila. This discovery eventually led to the identification of the heat-shock proteins (HSP) or stress proteins whose expression this puffing represented. Increased synthesis of selected proteins in Drosophila cells following stresses such as heat shock was first reported in 1974. In 1974, Tissieres, Mitchell and Tracy discovered that heat-shock induces the production of a small number of proteins and inhibits the production of most others. This initial biochemical finding gave rise to a large number of studies on the induction of heat shock and its biological role. Heat shock proteins often function as chaperones in the refolding of proteins damaged by heat stress. Heat shock proteins have been found in all species examined, from bacteria to humans, suggesting that they evolved very early and have an important function.

== Function ==
According to Marvin et al. sHSPs independently express not only in heat shock response but also have developmental roles in embryonic or juvenile stages of mammals, teleost fish and some lower vertebral genomes. hspb1 (HSP27) is expressed during stress and during the development of embryo, somites, mid-hindbrain, heart and lens in zebrafish. Expression of the hspb4 gene, which codes for alpha crystallin, increases considerably in the lens in response to heat shock.

=== Upregulation in stress ===
Production of high levels of heat shock proteins can also be triggered by exposure to different kinds of environmental stress conditions, such as infection, inflammation, exercise, exposure of the cell to harmful materials (ethanol, arsenic, and trace metals, among many others), ultraviolet light, starvation, hypoxia (oxygen deprivation), nitrogen deficiency (in plants) or water deprivation. As a consequence, the heat shock proteins are also referred to as stress proteins and their upregulation is sometimes described more generally as part of the cell stress response.

The mechanism by which heat shock (or other environmental stressors) activates the heat shock factor has been determined in bacteria. During heat stress, outer membrane proteins (OMPs) do not fold and cannot insert correctly into the outer membrane. They accumulate in the periplasmic space. These OMPs are detected by DegS, an inner membrane protease, that passes the signal through the membrane to the sigmaE transcription factor. However, some studies suggest that an increase in damaged or abnormal proteins brings HSPs into action.

Some bacterial heat shock proteins are upregulated via a mechanism involving RNA thermometers such as the FourU thermometer, ROSE element and the Hsp90 cis-regulatory element.

Petersen and Mitchell found that in D. melanogaster a mild heat shock pretreatment which induces heat shock gene expression (and greatly enhances survival after a subsequent higher temperature heat shock) primarily affects translation of messenger RNA rather than transcription of RNA. Heat shock proteins are also synthesized in D. melanogaster during recovery from prolonged exposure to cold in the absence of heat shock. A mild heat shock pretreatment of the same kind that protects against death from subsequent heat shock also prevents death from exposure to cold.

=== Role as chaperone ===
Several heat shock proteins function as intra-cellular chaperones for other proteins. They play an important role in protein–protein interactions such as folding and assisting in the establishment of proper protein conformation (shape) and prevention of unwanted protein aggregation. By helping to stabilize partially unfolded proteins, HSPs aid in transporting proteins across membranes within the cell.

Some members of the HSP family are expressed at low to moderate levels in all organisms because of their essential role in protein maintenance.

=== Management ===
Heat-shock proteins also occur under non-stressful conditions, simply "monitoring" the cell's proteins. Some examples of their role as "monitors" are that they carry old proteins to the cell's "recycling bin" (proteasome) and they help newly synthesised proteins fold properly.

These activities are part of a cell's own repair system, called the "cellular stress response" or the "heat-shock response".

Recently, there are several studies that suggest a correlation between HSPs and dual frequency ultrasound as demonstrated by the use of LDM-MED machine.

Heat shock proteins appear to be more susceptible to self-degradation than other proteins due to slow proteolytic action on themselves.

=== Cardiovascular ===
Heat shock proteins appear to serve a significant cardiovascular role. Hsp90, hsp84, hsp70, hsp27, hsp20, and alpha B crystallin all have been reported as having roles in the cardiovasculature.

Hsp90 binds both endothelial nitric oxide synthase and soluble guanylate cyclase, which in turn are involved in vascular relaxation.

The subset of hsp70, extracellular hsp70 (ehsp70) and intracellular hsp70 (ihsp70), has been shown to have a pivotal role in managing oxidative stress and other physiological factors.

Krief et al. referred hspb7 (cvHSP - cardiovascular Heat shock protein) as cardiac heat shock protein. Gata4 is an essential gene responsible for cardiac morphogenesis. It also regulates the gene expression of hspb7 and hspb12. Gata4 depletion can result in reduced transcript levels of hspb7 and hspb12 and this could result in cardiac myopathies in zebrafish embryos as observed by Gabriel et al.

hspb7 also acts in the downregulation of Kupffer vesicles which is responsible for regulation of left-right asymmetry of heart in zebrafish. Along with hspb7, hspb12 is involved in cardiac laterality determination. A kinase of the nitric oxide cell signalling pathway, protein kinase G, phosphorylates a small heat shock protein, hsp20. Hsp20 phosphorylation correlates well with smooth muscle relaxation and is one significant phosphoprotein involved in the process. Hsp20 appears significant in development of the smooth muscle phenotype during development. Hsp20 also serves a significant role in preventing platelet aggregation, cardiac myocyte function and prevention of apoptosis after ischemic injury, and skeletal muscle function and muscle insulin response.

Hsp27 is a major phosphoprotein during women's contractions. Hsp27 functions in small muscle migrations and appears to serve an integral role.

=== Immunity ===
Function of heat-shock proteins in immunity is based on their ability to bind not only whole proteins, but also peptides. The affinity and specificity of this interaction is typically low.

It was shown, that at least some of the HSPs possess this ability, mainly hsp70, hsp90, gp96 and calreticulin, and their peptide-binding sites were identified. In the case of gp96 it is not clear whether it can bind peptides in vivo, although its peptide-binding site has been found. But gp96 immune function could be peptide-independent, because it is involved in proper folding of many immune receptors, like TLR or integrins.

Apart from that, HSPs can stimulate immune receptors and are important in proper folding of proteins involved in pro-inflammatory signaling pathways.

==== Antigen presentation ====
HSPs are indispensable components of antigen presentation pathways - the classical ones and also cross-presentation and autophagy.

===== MHCI presentation =====
In the simplified view of this pathway HSPs are usually not mentioned: antigenic peptides are generated in proteasome, transported into ER through protein transporter TAP and loaded onto MHCI, which then goes through secretory pathway on plasma membrane.

But HSPs play an important part in transfer of unfolded proteins to proteasome and generated peptides to MHCI. Hsp90 can associate with proteasome and take over generated peptides. Afterwards, it can associate with hsp70, which can take the peptide further to the TAP. After passing through TAP, ER chaperons are getting important - calreticulin binds peptides and together with gp96 form peptide loading complex for MHCI.

This handing over with peptides is important, because HSPs can shield hydrophobic residues in peptides which would be otherwise problematic in aquatic cytosol. Also simple diffusion of peptides would be too ineffective.

===== MHCII presentation =====
In MHCII presentation, HSPs are involved in clathrin-dependent endocytosis. Also when HSPs are extracellular, they can guide their associated peptides into MHCII pathway, although it is not known how they are distinguished from the cross-presented ones (see below).

===== Autophagy =====
HSPs are involved in classical macroautophagy, when protein aggregates are enclosed by double membrane and degraded afterwards. They are also involved in a special type of autophagy called chaperone-mediated autophagy, when they enable cytosolic proteins to get into lysosomes.

===== Cross-presentation =====
When HSPs are extracellular, they can bind to specific receptors on dendritic cells (DC) and promote cross-presentation of their carried peptides. The most important receptors in this case are scavenger receptors, mainly SRECI and LOX-1. CD91 scavenger receptor has been previously proposed as the common HSP receptor. But now its relevance is controversial because the majority of DC types does not express CD91 in relevant amounts and the binding capacity for many HSPs has not been proved. Stimulation of some scavenger receptors can even result in immunosuppression, this is the case for SRA.

LOX-1 and SRECI when stimulated guide HSPs with their associated peptides into cross-presentation. LOX-1 binds mainly hsp60 and hsp70. SRECI is now considered to by the common heat-shock protein receptor because it binds hsp60, hsp70, hsp90, hsp110, gp96 and GRP170.

The relevance for this type of cross-presentation is high especially in tumour-immunosurveillance. Thanks to the HSP, the bound peptide is protected against degradation in dendritic cell compartments and the efficiency of cross-presentation is higher. Also internalisation of HSP-peptide complex is more efficient than internalisation of soluble antigens. Tumor cells usually express only a few neo-antigens, which can be targeted by immune system and also not all tumor cells express them. Because of that the amount of tumor antigens is restricted and high efficiency of cross-presentation is necessary for mounting strong immune response.

Hsp70 and hsp90 are also involved intracellulary in cytosolic pathway of cross-presentation where they help antigens to get from endosome into the cytosol.

==== Damage-associated molecular patterns ====
Extracellular heat-shock proteins can be sensed by the immune system as damage-associated molecular patterns (DAMPs). They are able to interact with pattern recognition receptors like TLR2 or TLR4 and activate antigen presenting cells by upregulation of co-stimulation molecules (CD80, CD86, CD40), MHC molecules and pro-inflammatory and Th1 cytokines. HSP70 was shown to react to DAMP release, causing an influx of HSP70-positive T-EVs (tumor cells) that initiate anti-tumor immune signaling cascades.

Heat-shock proteins can signal also through scavenger receptors, which can either associate with TLRs, or activate pro-inflammatory intracellular pathways like MAPK or NF-_{kB}. With the exception of SRA, which down-regulates immune response.

==== Transport into extracellular space ====
Heat-shock proteins can be secreted from immune cells or tumour cells by non-canonical secretion pathway, or leaderless pathway, because they do not have the leader peptide, which navigate proteins into endoplasmic reticulum. The non-canonical secretion can be similar to the one, which occurs for IL1_{b}, and it is induced by stress conditions.

Another possibility is release of HSPs during cell necrosis, or secretion of HSPs in exosomes. During special types of apoptotic cell death (for example induced by some chemotherapeutics), HSPs can also appear on the extracellular side of plasma membrane.

There is a debate about how long can HSP keep its peptide in extracellular space, at least for hsp70 the complex with peptide is quite stable.

The role of extracellular HSPs can be miscellaneous. It depends a lot on context of tissue whether HSPs will stimulate the immune system or suppress immunity. They can promote Th17, Th1, Th2 or Treg responses depending on antigen-presenting cells.

As a result, the clinical use of heat-shock proteins is both in cancer treatment (boosting an immune response) and treatment of autoimmune diseases (suppress of immunity).

=== Lens ===
Alpha crystallin (α4- crystallin) or hspb4 is involved in the development of lens in Zebrafish as it is expressed in response to heat shock in the Zebrafish embryo in its developmental stages.

== Clinical significance ==
=== HSF 1 ===
Heat shock factor 1 (HSF 1) is a transcription factor that is involved in the general maintenance and upregulation of Hsp70 protein expression. Recently it was discovered that HSF1 is a powerful multifaceted modifier of carcinogenesis. HSF1 knockout mice show significantly decreased incidence of skin tumor after topical application of DMBA (7,12-dimethylbenzanthracene), a mutagen. Moreover, HSF1 inhibition by a potent RNA aptamer attenuates mitogenic (MAPK) signaling and induces cancer cell apoptosis.

=== Diabetes mellitus ===
Diabetes mellitus (DM) is an immune-disease characterized by the presence of hyperglycemia. Typically these symptoms are brought about by insulin deficiency. However, there have been many recent articles alluding to a correlation between hsp70, in some cases hsp60, and DM. Another recent article discovered the ratio of ehsp70 and ihsp70 could have an effect on DM, leading to a sufficient biomarker. Serum levels of hsp70 have also been shown to increase over time in patients with diabetes.

=== Cancer ===
HSP expression plays a pivotal role in cancer identification. Recent discoveries have shown that high concentrations of eHSP can indicate the presence of contentious tumors. Additionally, HSPs have been shown to benefit oncologists in oral cancer diagnosis. Using techniques such as dot immunoassay and ELISA test researchers have been able to determine that HSP-specific phage antibodies could be beneficial in-vitro cancer diagnosis markers. HSPs have also been shown to interact with cancer adaptations such as drug resistance, tumor cell production and lifespan, and the up-regulation and down-regulation of oncomirs.

== Applications ==
=== Cancer vaccines ===
Given their role in presentation, HSPs are useful as immunologic adjuvants (DAMPS) in boosting the response to a vaccine. Furthermore, some researchers speculate that HSPs may be involved in binding protein fragments from dead malignant cells and presenting them to the immune system. In a recent study published by Sedlacek et al., HSP was shown to effect different signaling pathways involved in carcinogenesis responses such as STAT1 activation, gp96-activated macrophages, and activation of NK cells. Therefore, HSPs may be useful for increasing the effectiveness of cancer vaccines.

Also isolated HSPs from tumor cells are able to act as a specific anti-tumor vaccine by themselves. Tumour cells express a lot of HSPs because they need to chaperone mutated and over-expressed oncogenes, tumour cells are also in a permanent stress. When HSPs from a tumour are isolated, the peptide repertoire bound by HSPs is somewhat a fingerprint of these particular tumour cells. Application of such HSPs back into patient then stimulate immune system (promotes efficient antigen presentation and act as DAMP) specifically against the tumor and leads to tumor regression. This immunisation is not functional against a different tumour. It was used in autologous manner in clinical studies for gp96 and hsp70, but in vitro this works for all immune-relevant HSPs.

=== Anticancer therapeutics ===
Intracellular heat shock proteins are highly expressed in cancerous cells and are essential to the survival of these cell types due to presence of mutated and over-expressed oncogenes. Many HSPs can also promote invasiveness and metastasis formation in tumours, block apoptosis, or promote resistance to anti-cancer drugs. Hence small molecule inhibitors of HSPs, especially Hsp90 show promise as anticancer agents. The potent Hsp90 inhibitor 17-AAG was in clinical trials for the treatment of several types of cancer, but for various reasons unrelated to efficacy did not go on to Phase 3. HSPgp96 also shows promise as an anticancer treatment and is currently in clinical trials against non-small cell lung cancer.

=== Autoimmunity treatment ===
Acting as DAMPs, HSPs can extracellularly promote autoimmune reactions leading to diseases as rheumatoid arthritis or systemic lupus erythematosus. Nevertheless, it was found, that application of some HSPs into patients is able to induce immune tolerance and treat autoimmune diseases. The underlying mechanism is not known. HSPs (especially hsp60 and hsp70) are used in clinical studies to treat rheumatoid arthritis and type 1 diabetes. Current therapeutic research areas in the treatment for DM include: long-term physical exercise, hot tub therapy (HTT), and alfalfa-derived HSP70 (aHSP70).

Hsp90 inhibitors are another possible treatment for autoimmunity, because hsp90 is necessary for proper folding of many pro-inflammatory proteins (components of PI3K, MAPK and NF-_{kB} cascades).

=== Agricultural ===
Researchers are also investigating the role of HSPs in conferring stress tolerance to hybridized plants, hoping to address drought and poor soil conditions for farming.

== Classification ==
The principal heat-shock proteins that have chaperone activity belong to five conserved classes: HSP33, HSP60, HSP70/HSP110, HSP90, HSP100, and the small heat-shock proteins (sHSPs). A standard nomenclature for human HSP genes is available.

Approximate molecular weight (kDa)	Family	Prokaryotic proteins	Eukaryotic proteins	Human gene family	Function
10 kDa	HSP10	GroES	Cpn10	HSPE	Co-factor of Hsp60
20–25 kDa	GrpE	GrpE		GRPE	Co-factor of DnaK/Hsp70, only for bacterial or mitochondrial/chloroplastic forms
20–30 kDa	HSP20 (sHSP)	HSP20	Eleven members in mammals including Hsp27 (HSPB1)	HSPB	Chaperones
40 kDa	HSP40	DnaJ	DnaJ	DNAJ	Co-factor of Hsp70
60 kDa	HSP60	GroEL	Cpn60 (mitochondria and chloroplasts); CCT (TRiC) (cytosol)	HSPD: HSPD1 (mitochondria); CCT: CCT1 (TCP1) through CCT8 (cytosol)	Involved in protein folding; these are chaperonins
70 kDa	HSP70	DnaK	Includes Hsp71 (HSPA8), Hsp72 (HSPA1A), Grp78 (BiP, HSPA5); Hsx70 (HSPA1B) found only in primates. Hsp110 genes are derived from this superfamily and are coded HSPH1 through 4.	HSPA	Protein folding and unfolding. Provides thermotolerance to cell on exposure to heat stress and protects against H2O2. Also prevents protein folding during post-translational import into the mitochondria/chloroplast. Hsp110 provides tolerance of extreme temperature.
90 kDa	HSP90	HtpG, C62.5	Hsp90, Grp94 (HSPC4)	HSPC	Maintenance of steroid receptors and transcription factors
100 kDa	HSP100 (Clp)	ClpB, ClpA, ClpX	Hsp104 (CLPB)	CLPB	Unfolding of insoluble protein aggregates; co-factor of DnaK/Hsp70

Although the most important members of each family are tabulated here, some species may express additional chaperones, co-chaperones, and heat shock proteins not listed. In addition, many of these proteins may have multiple splice variants (Hsp90α and Hsp90β, for instance) or conflicts of nomenclature (Hsp72 is sometimes called Hsp70).

== See also ==
- Cold-shock domain
