= CCT2 =

CCT2 may refer to:

- CCT2 (gene)
- Cookstown Airport, Ontario, Canada: Transport Canada location identifier CCT2
