= TBCA =

Protein-coding gene in the species Homo sapiens

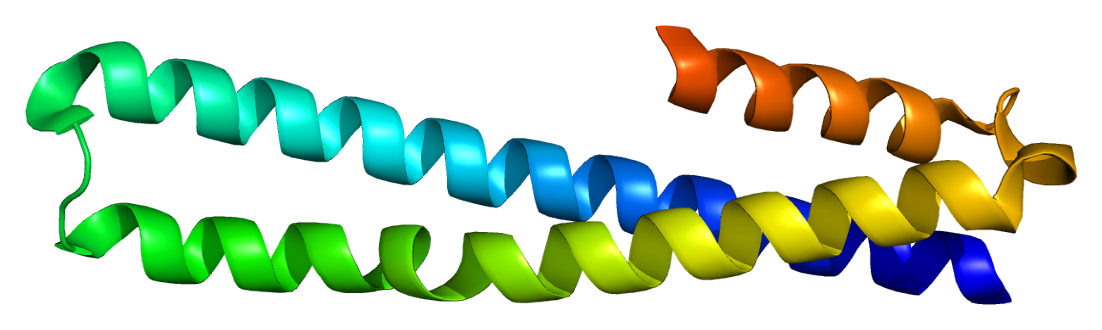
Available structures
PDB	Ortholog search: PDBe RCSB
PDB	List of PDB id codes 1H7C

Identifiers
- Aliases: TBCA, tubulin folding cofactor A
- External IDs: OMIM: 610058; MGI: 107549; HomoloGene: 3388; GeneCards: TBCA; OMA:TBCA - orthologs

Gene location (Human)
Chr.	Chromosome 5 (human)
Band	5q14.1	Start	77,691,166 bp
Band	5q14.1	End	77,868,780 bp

Gene location (Mouse)
Chr.	Chromosome 13 (mouse)
Band	13|13 C3	Start	94,925,418 bp
Band	13|13 C3	End	94,979,430 bp
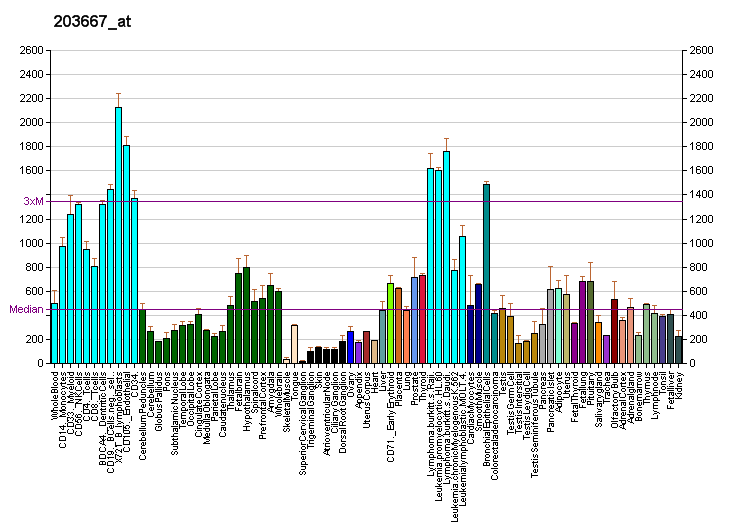
RNA expression pattern
Bgee	Human / Mouse (ortholog); Top expressed in: right adrenal cortex; left adrenal gland; left adrenal cortex; ganglionic eminence; ventricular zone; left ovary; islet of Langerhans; anterior pituitary; gastric mucosa; tibial arteries / Top expressed in: cumulus cell; endocardial cushion; facial motor nucleus; supraoptic nucleus; medial ganglionic eminence; atrioventricular valve; mandibular prominence; maxillary prominence; abdominal wall; trigeminal ganglion; More reference expression data
BioGPS	More reference expression data
Gene ontology
Molecular function	chaperone binding; protein binding; beta-tubulin binding; RNA binding
Cellular component	cytoplasm; microtubule cytoskeleton; nucleolus; microtubule; cytoskeleton; extracellular exosome
Biological process	post-chaperonin tubulin folding pathway; tubulin complex assembly; protein folding
Sources:Amigo / QuickGO
Orthologs
Species	Human	Mouse
Entrez	6902	21371
Ensembl	ENSG00000171530	ENSMUSG00000042043
UniProt	O75347	P48428
RefSeq (mRNA)	NM_004607; NM_001297738; NM_001297740	NM_009321
RefSeq (protein)	NP_001284667; NP_001284669; NP_004598	NP_033347
Location (UCSC)	Chr 5: 77.69 – 77.87 Mb	Chr 13: 94.93 – 94.98 Mb
PubMed search
- Wikidata
View/Edit Human	View/Edit Mouse

Tubulin-specific chaperone A is a protein that in humans is encoded by the TBCA gene.

The product of this gene is one of four proteins (cofactors A, D, E, and C) involved in the pathway leading to correctly folded beta-tubulin from folding intermediates. Cofactors A and D are believed to play a role in capturing and stabilizing beta-tubulin intermediates in a quasi-native confirmation. Cofactor E binds to the cofactor D/beta-tubulin complex; interaction with cofactor C then causes the release of beta-tubulin polypeptides that are committed to the native state. This gene encodes chaperonin cofactor A.
