= TRIC =

TRIC may refer to:

- TRiC (complex), a multiprotein complex of eukaryotic cells involved in protein folding
- Tahoe Reno Industrial Center, an industrial and manufacturing park in Storey County, Nevada
- Television and Radio Industries Club, a UK industry association
- Tric, a fictional nightclub from the television series One Tree Hill
