= ATP phosphohydrolase (steroid-exporting) =

ATP phosphohydrolase (steroid-exporting) may refer to:

- Steroid-transporting ATPase, an enzyme
- Xenobiotic-transporting ATPase, an enzyme
