= Non-chaperonin molecular chaperone ATPase =

Class of enzymes

Identifiers
- EC no.: 3.6.4.10

Databases
- IntEnz: IntEnz view
- BRENDA: BRENDA entry
- ExPASy: NiceZyme view
- KEGG: KEGG entry
- MetaCyc: metabolic pathway
- PRIAM: profile
- PDB structures: RCSB PDB PDBe PDBsum
Search
- PMC: articles
- PubMed: articles
- NCBI: proteins

Non-chaperonin molecular chaperone ATPase (EC 3.6.4.10, molecular chaperone Hsc70 ATPase) is an enzyme with systematic name ATP phosphohydrolase (polypeptide-polymerizing). This enzyme catalyses the following chemical reaction

ATP + H_{2}O $\rightleftharpoons$ ADP + phosphate

These enzymes perform many functions that are similar to those of chaperonins.

== See also ==
- Chaperone (protein)
