= CCT8 =

Protein-coding gene in humans

Identifiers
- Aliases: CCT8, C21orf112, Cctq, D21S246, PRED71, chaperonin containing TCP1 subunit 8
- External IDs: OMIM: 617786; MGI: 107183; GeneCards: CCT8

Gene location (Human)
Chr.	Chromosome 21 (human)
Band	21q21.3	Start	29,055,805 bp
Band	21q21.3	End	29,073,797 bp

Gene location (Mouse)
Chr.	Chromosome 16 (mouse)
Band	16|16 C3.3	Start	87,280,214 bp
Band	16|16 C3.3	End	87,292,761 bp
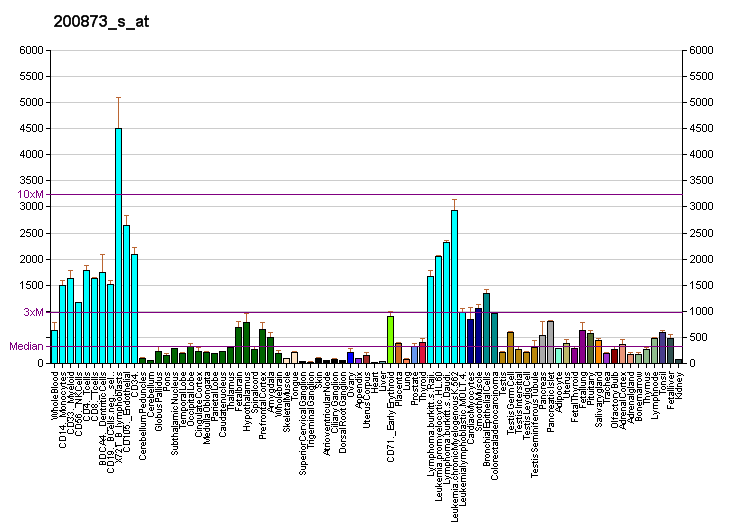
RNA expression pattern
Bgee	Human / Mouse (ortholog); Top expressed in: oocyte; gonad; secondary oocyte; epithelium of nasopharynx; embryo; ganglionic eminence; endothelial cell; germinal epithelium; Epithelium of choroid plexus; ventricular zone / Top expressed in: otic placode; otic vesicle; epiblast; mandibular prominence; maxillary prominence; saccule; somite; primitive streak; abdominal wall; tail of embryo; More reference expression data
BioGPS	More reference expression data
Gene ontology
Molecular function	nucleotide binding; protein binding; ATP binding; protein folding chaperone activity; unfolded protein binding; cadherin binding
Cellular component	cell body; cytosol; centrosome; cell projection; cilium; nucleoplasm; microtubule organizing center; zona pellucida receptor complex; intermediate filament cytoskeleton; microtubule; extracellular exosome; cytoskeleton; cytoplasm; chaperonin-containing T-complex; extracellular region; secretory granule lumen; azurophil granule lumen; ficolin-1-rich granule lumen
Biological process	positive regulation of protein localization to Cajal body; positive regulation of establishment of protein localization to telomere; pore complex assembly; protein stabilization; positive regulation of telomere maintenance via telomerase; toxin transport; positive regulation of telomerase RNA localization to Cajal body; binding of sperm to zona pellucida; protein folding; 'de novo' protein folding; neutrophil degranulation; chaperone-mediated protein folding
Sources:Amigo / QuickGO
Orthologs
Databases	NCBI: entry; OMA: entry
Species	Human	Mouse
Entrez	10694	12469
Ensembl	ENSG00000156261	ENSMUSG00000025613
UniProt	P50990	P42932
RefSeq (mRNA)	NM_006585; NM_001282907; NM_001282908; NM_001282909	NM_009840
RefSeq (protein)	NP_001269836; NP_001269837; NP_001269838; NP_006576	NP_033970
Location (UCSC)	Chr 21: 29.06 – 29.07 Mb	Chr 16: 87.28 – 87.29 Mb
PubMed search
- Wikidata
View/Edit Human	View/Edit Mouse

T-complex protein 1 subunit theta is a protein that in humans is encoded by the CCT8 gene. The CCT8 protein is a component of the TRiC complex.

== See also ==
- TCP1, T-complex protein 1 subunit alpha
- Chaperonin
