= PPP4R3B =

Protein-coding gene in the species Homo sapiens

Identifiers
- Aliases: PPP4R3B, FLFL2, PP4R3B, PSY2, smk1, SMEK2, protein phosphatase 4 regulatory subunit 3B
- External IDs: OMIM: 610352; MGI: 2144474; GeneCards: PPP4R3B

Gene location (Human)
Chr.	Chromosome 2 (human)
Band	2p16.1	Start	55,547,292 bp
Band	2p16.1	End	55,618,880 bp

Gene location (Mouse)
Chr.	Chromosome 11 (mouse)
Band	11|11 A3.3	Start	29,172,890 bp
Band	11|11 A3.3	End	29,220,797 bp
RNA expression pattern
Bgee	Human / Mouse (ortholog); Top expressed in: bronchial epithelial cell; buccal mucosa cell; jejunal mucosa; ventricular zone; Achilles tendon; ganglionic eminence; mucosa of paranasal sinus; mucosa of sigmoid colon; epithelium of colon; tonsil / Top expressed in: saccule; spermatocyte; otic placode; otic vesicle; spermatid; genital tubercle; olfactory epithelium; blood; medullary collecting duct; ventricular zone; More reference expression data
BioGPS	n/a
Gene ontology
Molecular function	protein binding
Cellular component	cytoplasm; centrosome; protein phosphatase 4 complex; cytoskeleton; nucleus; nucleoplasm; microtubule organizing center; nuclear speck
Biological process	regulation of lipid metabolic process; protein dephosphorylation; positive regulation of gluconeogenesis
Sources:Amigo / QuickGO
Orthologs
Databases	NCBI: entry; OMA: entry
Species	Human	Mouse
Entrez	57223	104570
Ensembl	ENSG00000275052	ENSMUSG00000020463
UniProt	Q5MIZ7	Q922R5
RefSeq (mRNA)	NM_001122964; NM_001282850; NM_020463	NM_134034
RefSeq (protein)	NP_001116436; NP_001269779; NP_065196	NP_598795; NP_001350287; NP_001350288; NP_001350289; NP_001350290 NP_001350291
Location (UCSC)	Chr 2: 55.55 – 55.62 Mb	Chr 11: 29.17 – 29.22 Mb
PubMed search
- Wikidata
View/Edit Human	View/Edit Mouse

Serine/threonine-protein phosphatase 4 regulatory subunit 3B is a protein that in humans is encoded by the PPP4R3B gene (previously SMEK2). This protein functions as a regulatory subunit for a serine/threonine-protein phosphatase 4 complex formed out of PPP4C, PPP4R2, and PPP4R3B.

== Interactions ==
SMEK2 has been shown to interact with PPP4C.
