= PPP4C =

Protein-coding gene in humans

Identifiers
- Aliases: PPP4C, PP4, PP4C, PPH3, PPP4, PPX, PP-X, protein phosphatase 4 catalytic subunit
- External IDs: OMIM: 602035; MGI: 1891763; GeneCards: PPP4C
Enzyme activity
| EC # | BRENDA | ExPASy | KEGG | MetaCyc |
|---|---|---|---|---|
| 3.1.3.16 | ↗ | ↗ | ↗ | ↗ |

Gene location (Human)
| Chr. | Chromosome 16 (human) |
| Band | 16p11.2 | Start | 30,075,978 bp |
| Band | 16p11.2 | End | 30,085,376 bp |

Gene location (Mouse)
| Chr. | Chromosome 7 (mouse) |
| Band | 7|7 F3 | Start | 126,385,038 bp |
| Band | 7|7 F3 | End | 126,391,668 bp |
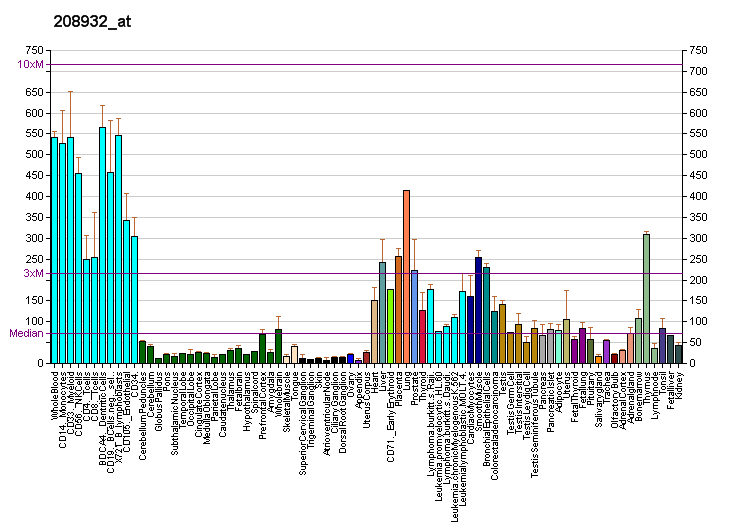
RNA expression pattern
| Bgee | Human / Mouse (ortholog); Top expressed in: monocyte; granulocyte; stromal cell of endometrium; mucosa of transverse colon; right testis; left testis; skin of abdomen; skin of leg; ganglionic eminence; left adrenal gland / Top expressed in: mandibular prominence; maxillary prominence; granulocyte; epiblast; somite; abdominal wall; primitive streak; thymus; ventricular zone; medial ganglionic eminence; More reference expression data |
| BioGPS | More reference expression data |
Gene ontology
| Molecular function | phosphoprotein phosphatase activity; metal ion binding; NF-kappaB-inducing kinase activity; protein binding; hydrolase activity; protein serine/threonine phosphatase activity |
| Cellular component | plasma membrane; nucleoplasm; microtubule organizing center; cytoskeleton; nucleus; protein phosphatase 4 complex; cytoplasm; cytosol |
| Biological process | regulation of double-strand break repair via homologous recombination; NIK/NF-kappaB signaling; protein dephosphorylation |
Sources:Amigo / QuickGO
Orthologs
| Databases | NCBI: entry; OMA: entry |
| Species | Human | Mouse |
| Entrez | 5531 | 56420 |
| Ensembl | ENSG00000149923 | ENSMUSG00000030697 |
| UniProt | P60510 | P97470 |
| RefSeq (mRNA) | NM_001303503; NM_001303504; NM_001303506; NM_001303507; NM_002720 | NM_019674; NM_001360464 |
| RefSeq (protein) | NP_001290432; NP_001290433; NP_001290435; NP_001290436; NP_002711 | NP_062648; NP_001347393 |
| Location (UCSC) | Chr 16: 30.08 – 30.09 Mb | Chr 7: 126.39 – 126.39 Mb |
| PubMed search |
- Wikidata
| View/Edit Human | View/Edit Mouse |

Serine/threonine-protein phosphatase 4 catalytic subunit is an enzyme that in humans is encoded by the PPP4C gene.

== Interactions ==
PPP4C has been shown to interact with:

- CCDC6,
- CCT2,
- CCT3,
- CCT4,
- CCT5,
- CCT6A,
- CCT7,
- IGBP1,
- PPP2R1A,
- PPP4R1,
- PPP4R3B,
- REL,
- T-complex 1, and
- TRAF6.
