= PPP4R1 =

Protein-coding gene in the species Homo sapiens

Identifiers
- Aliases: PPP4R1, MEG1, PP4(Rmeg), PP4R1, protein phosphatase 4 regulatory subunit 1
- External IDs: OMIM: 604908; MGI: 1917601; GeneCards: PPP4R1

Gene location (Human)
Chr.	Chromosome 18 (human)
Band	18p11.22	Start	9,546,791 bp
Band	18p11.22	End	9,615,240 bp

Gene location (Mouse)
Chr.	Chromosome 17 (mouse)
Band	17|17 E1.1	Start	66,089,568 bp
Band	17|17 E1.1	End	66,148,921 bp
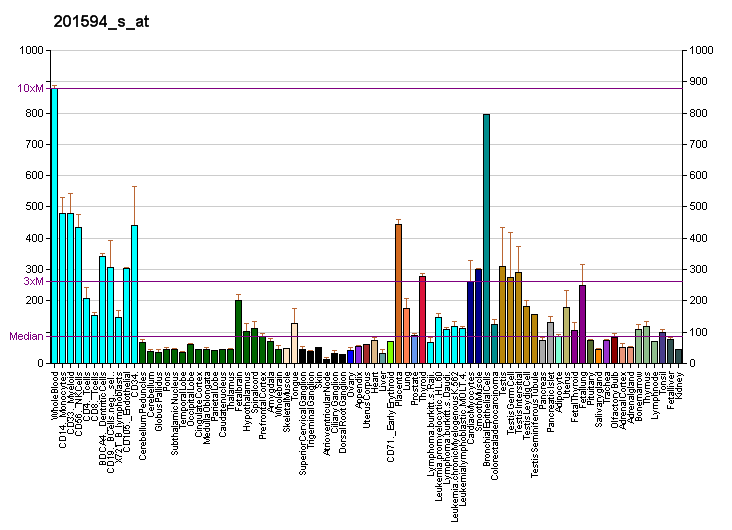
RNA expression pattern
Bgee	Human / Mouse (ortholog); Top expressed in: sperm; gingival epithelium; mucosa of pharynx; visceral pleura; Achilles tendon; oral cavity; amniotic fluid; epithelium of colon; ventricular zone; nasal epithelium / Top expressed in: spermatid; tail of embryo; granulocyte; intestinal villus; primitive streak; genital tubercle; testicle; Paneth cell; vas deferens; spermatocyte; More reference expression data
BioGPS	More reference expression data
Gene ontology
Molecular function	protein binding; phosphoprotein phosphatase activity; protein phosphatase regulator activity; protein serine/threonine phosphatase activity
Cellular component	protein phosphatase 4 complex
Biological process	protein phosphorylation; regulation of catalytic activity; signal transduction; protein dephosphorylation; regulation of phosphoprotein phosphatase activity
Sources:Amigo / QuickGO
Orthologs
Databases	NCBI: entry; OMA: entry
Species	Human	Mouse
Entrez	9989	70351
Ensembl	ENSG00000154845	ENSMUSG00000061950
UniProt	Q8TF05	Q8K2V1
RefSeq (mRNA)	NM_001042388; NM_005134; NM_001382562	NM_001114131; NM_146081
RefSeq (protein)	NP_001035847; NP_005125; NP_001369491	NP_001107603; NP_666193
Location (UCSC)	Chr 18: 9.55 – 9.62 Mb	Chr 17: 66.09 – 66.15 Mb
PubMed search
- Wikidata
View/Edit Human	View/Edit Mouse

Serine/threonine-protein phosphatase 4 regulatory subunit 1 is an enzyme that in humans is encoded by the PPP4R1 gene.

== Interactions ==
PPP4R1 has been shown to interact with PPP4C.
