= TRiC (complex) =

Multiprotein complex used in cellular proteostasis

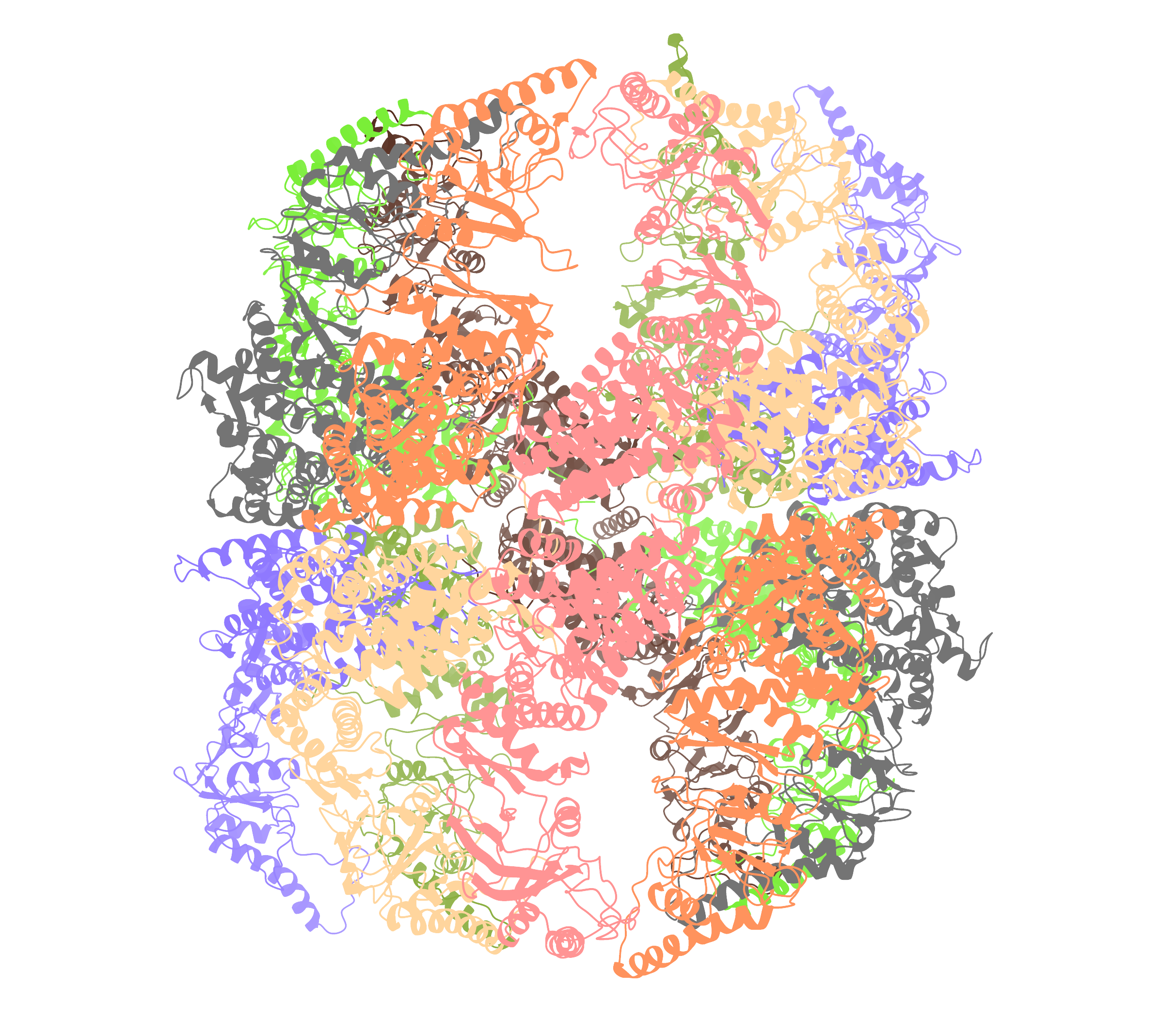
Structure of Saccharomyces cerevisiae TRiC in the AMP-PNP bound state (PDB 5GW5).

T-complex protein Ring Complex (TRiC), otherwise known as Chaperonin Containing TCP-1 (CCT), (Note: The term "TCP-1" is variously expanded as "T-complex protein 1" and "tailless complex polypeptide 1". The "T-complex" is the same as tailless complex, a CCT locus associated with tail length in mice.) is a multiprotein complex and the chaperonin of eukaryotic cells. Like the bacterial GroEL, the TRiC complex aids in the folding of ~10% of the proteome, and actin and tubulin are some of its best known substrates. TRiC is an example of a biological machine that folds substrates within the central cavity of its barrel-like assembly using the energy from ATP hydrolysis.

== Subunits ==
The human TRiC complex is formed by two rings containing 8 similar but non-identical subunits, each with molecular weights of ~60 kDa. The two rings are stacked in an asymmetrical fashion, forming a barrel-like structure with a molecular weight of ~1 MDa.

| Subunit | MW (kDa)^{[A]} | Features |
|---|---|---|
| TCP1 (CCT1/α) | 60 | |
| CCT2 (β) | 57 | |
| CCT3 (γ) | 61 | |
| CCT4 (δ) | 58 | |
| CCT5 (ε) | 60 | |
| CCT6 (ζ) | 58 | Two copies in human genome, CCT6A and CCT6B. |
| CCT7 (η) | 59 | |
| CCT8 (θ) | 60 | |

^{A} Molecular weight of human subunits.

Counterclockwise from the exterior, each ring is made of the subunits in the following order: 6-8-7-5-2-4-1-3.

== Evolution ==
The CCT evolved from the archaeal thermosome ~2Gya, with the two subunits diversifying into multiple units. The CCT changed from having one type of subunit, to having two, three, five, and finally eight types.

== See also ==
- Chaperone
- Chaperonin
- Heat shock protein
