= Dynein ATPase =

Class of enzymes

Identifiers
- EC no.: 3.6.4.2

Databases
- IntEnz: IntEnz view
- BRENDA: BRENDA entry
- ExPASy: NiceZyme view
- KEGG: KEGG entry
- MetaCyc: metabolic pathway
- PRIAM: profile
- PDB structures: RCSB PDB PDBe PDBsum
Search
- PMC: articles
- PubMed: articles
- NCBI: proteins

Dynein ATPase (EC 3.6.4.2, dynein adenosine 5'-triphosphatase) is an enzyme with systematic name ATP phosphohydrolase (tubulin-translocating). This enzyme catalyses the following chemical reaction

ATP + H_{2}O $\rightleftharpoons$ ADP + phosphate

This enzyme is a multisubunit protein complex associated with microtubules.

== See also ==
- Dynein
