= CCT4 =

Protein-coding gene in humans

Identifiers
- Aliases: CCT4, CCT-DELTA, Cctd, SRB, chaperonin containing TCP1 subunit 4
- External IDs: OMIM: 605142; MGI: 104689; GeneCards: CCT4

Gene location (Human)
Chr.	Chromosome 2 (human)
Band	2p15	Start	61,868,085 bp
Band	2p15	End	61,888,671 bp

Gene location (Mouse)
Chr.	Chromosome 11 (mouse)
Band	11 A3.2|11 14.25 cM	Start	22,940,519 bp
Band	11 A3.2|11 14.25 cM	End	22,953,780 bp
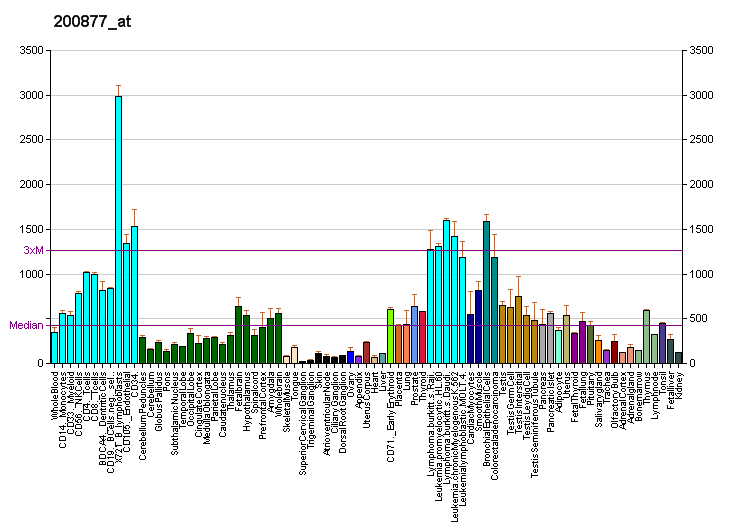
RNA expression pattern
Bgee	Human / Mouse (ortholog); Top expressed in: gonad; ventricular zone; parotid gland; embryo; ganglionic eminence; cartilage tissue; lactiferous duct; epithelium of nasopharynx; vulva; tibialis anterior muscle / Top expressed in: Gonadal ridge; abdominal wall; primitive streak; vas deferens; medial ganglionic eminence; dermis; somite; migratory enteric neural crest cell; Paneth cell; mandibular prominence; More reference expression data
BioGPS	More reference expression data
Gene ontology
Molecular function	nucleotide binding; protein binding; ATP binding; protein folding chaperone activity; unfolded protein binding; RNA binding
Cellular component	cell body; centrosome; cell projection; melanosome; nucleoplasm; microtubule organizing center; zona pellucida receptor complex; chaperonin-containing T-complex; microtubule; extracellular exosome; cytoskeleton; cytoplasm; cytosol
Biological process	positive regulation of protein localization to Cajal body; positive regulation of establishment of protein localization to telomere; scaRNA localization to Cajal body; protein stabilization; positive regulation of telomere maintenance via telomerase; toxin transport; protein folding; positive regulation of telomerase activity; positive regulation of telomerase RNA localization to Cajal body; binding of sperm to zona pellucida; 'de novo' protein folding; chaperone-mediated protein folding
Sources:Amigo / QuickGO
Orthologs
Databases	NCBI: entry; OMA: entry
Species	Human	Mouse
Entrez	10575	12464
Ensembl	ENSG00000115484	ENSMUSG00000007739
UniProt	P50991	P80315
RefSeq (mRNA)	NM_006430; NM_001256721	NM_009837
RefSeq (protein)	NP_001243650; NP_006421	NP_033967
Location (UCSC)	Chr 2: 61.87 – 61.89 Mb	Chr 11: 22.94 – 22.95 Mb
PubMed search
- Wikidata
View/Edit Human	View/Edit Mouse

T-complex protein 1 subunit delta is a protein that in humans is encoded by the CCT4 gene. The CCT4 protein is a component of the TRiC complex.

== Interactions ==
CCT4 has been shown to interact with PPP4C.
