= CCT6A =

Protein-coding gene in humans

Identifiers
- Aliases: CCT6A, CCT-zeta, CCT-zeta-1, CCT6, Cctz, HTR3, MoDP-2, TCP-1-zeta, TCP20, TCPZ, TTCP20, chaperonin containing TCP1 subunit 6A
- External IDs: OMIM: 104613; MGI: 107943; GeneCards: CCT6A

Gene location (Human)
Chr.	Chromosome 7 (human)
Band	7p11.2	Start	56,051,685 bp
Band	7p11.2	End	56,063,989 bp

Gene location (Mouse)
Chr.	Chromosome 5 (mouse)
Band	5|5 G1.3	Start	129,864,062 bp
Band	5|5 G1.3	End	129,875,212 bp
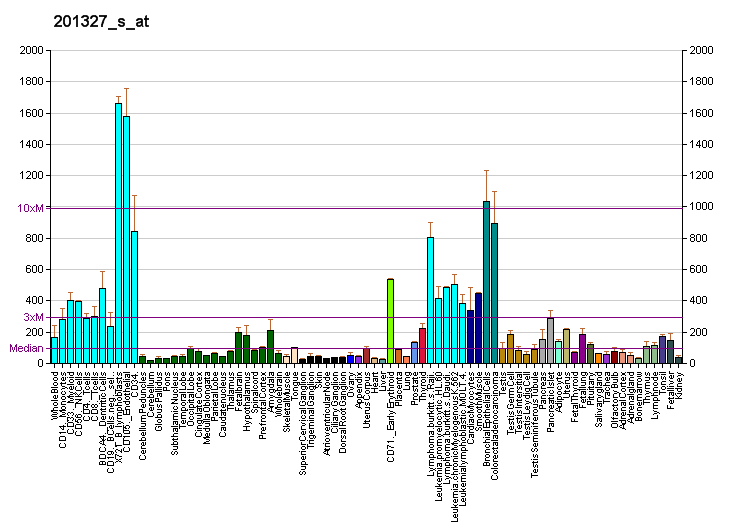

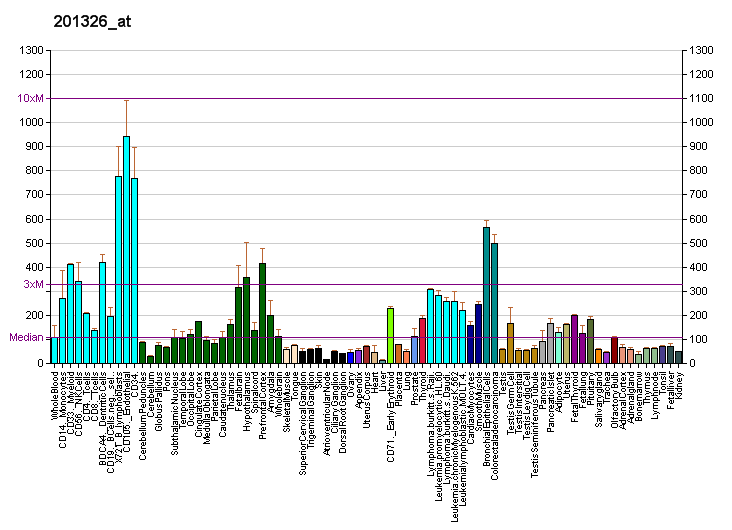
RNA expression pattern
Bgee	Human / Mouse (ortholog); Top expressed in: gonad; ganglionic eminence; ventricular zone; body of pancreas; skin of abdomen; superior surface of tongue; mucosa of transverse colon; skin of leg; islet of Langerhans; stromal cell of endometrium / Top expressed in: primitive streak; superior cervical ganglion; mandibular prominence; maxillary prominence; abdominal wall; migratory enteric neural crest cell; Gonadal ridge; trigeminal ganglion; human fetus; somite; More reference expression data
BioGPS	More reference expression data
Gene ontology
Molecular function	protein folding chaperone activity; nucleotide binding; WD40-repeat domain binding; protein binding; ATP binding; unfolded protein binding; RNA binding
Cellular component	chaperonin-containing T-complex; microtubule; extracellular exosome; extracellular matrix; cytoplasm; cytosol
Biological process	positive regulation of establishment of protein localization to telomere; protein stabilization; positive regulation of telomere maintenance via telomerase; protein folding; positive regulation of protein localization to Cajal body; positive regulation of telomerase RNA localization to Cajal body; 'de novo' protein folding; chaperone-mediated protein folding
Sources:Amigo / QuickGO
Orthologs
Databases	NCBI: entry; OMA: entry
Species	Human	Mouse
Entrez	908	12466
Ensembl	ENSG00000146731	ENSMUSG00000029447
UniProt	P40227	P80317
RefSeq (mRNA)	NM_001762; NM_001009186	NM_009838
RefSeq (protein)	NP_001009186; NP_001753	NP_033968
Location (UCSC)	Chr 7: 56.05 – 56.06 Mb	Chr 5: 129.86 – 129.88 Mb
PubMed search
- Wikidata
View/Edit Human	View/Edit Mouse

T-complex protein 1 subunit zeta is a protein that in humans is encoded by the CCT6A gene.

== Function ==
This gene encodes a molecular chaperone that is member of the TRiC complex. This complex consists of two identical stacked rings, each containing eight different proteins. Unfolded polypeptides enter the central cavity of the complex and are folded in an ATP-dependent manner. The complex folds various proteins, including actin and tubulin. Alternate transcriptional splice variants of this gene, encoding different isoforms, have been characterized.

== Interactions ==
CCT6A has been shown to interact with PPP4C.
