= CCT7 =

Protein-coding gene in humans

Identifiers
- Aliases: CCT7, CCTETA, CCTH, NIP7-1, TCP1ETA, chaperonin containing TCP1 subunit 7
- External IDs: OMIM: 605140; MGI: 107184; GeneCards: CCT7

Gene location (Human)
Chr.	Chromosome 2 (human)
Band	2p13.2	Start	73,233,420 bp
Band	2p13.2	End	73,253,021 bp

Gene location (Mouse)
Chr.	Chromosome 6 (mouse)
Band	6|6 C3	Start	85,428,496 bp
Band	6|6 C3	End	85,445,457 bp
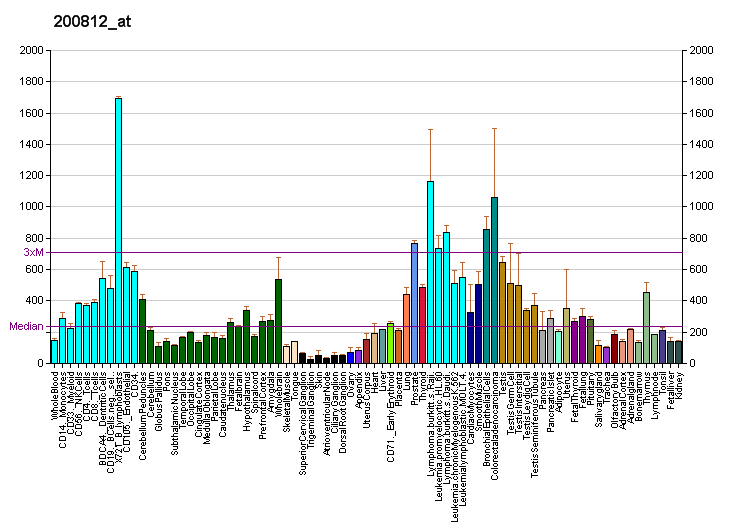
RNA expression pattern
Bgee	Human / Mouse (ortholog); Top expressed in: ganglionic eminence; ventricular zone; islet of Langerhans; right testis; left testis; right adrenal gland; right adrenal cortex; left adrenal gland; muscle of thigh; gastrocnemius muscle / Top expressed in: primitive streak; renal corpuscle; medullary collecting duct; medial ganglionic eminence; hair follicle; endothelial cell of lymphatic vessel; ureter; ascending aorta; epiblast; aortic valve; More reference expression data
BioGPS	More reference expression data
Gene ontology
Molecular function	protein binding; nucleotide binding; identical protein binding; ATP binding; protein folding chaperone activity; unfolded protein binding
Cellular component	cytoplasm; mitochondrion; cytosol; cell body; zona pellucida receptor complex; microtubule; extracellular exosome; chaperonin-containing T-complex
Biological process	positive regulation of protein localization to Cajal body; positive regulation of telomerase RNA localization to Cajal body; positive regulation of telomere maintenance via telomerase; toxin transport; positive regulation of establishment of protein localization to telomere; protein folding; binding of sperm to zona pellucida; protein stabilization; 'de novo' protein folding; chaperone-mediated protein folding
Sources:Amigo / QuickGO
Orthologs
Databases	NCBI: entry; OMA: entry
Species	Human	Mouse
Entrez	10574	12468
Ensembl	ENSG00000135624	ENSMUSG00000030007
UniProt	Q99832	P80313
RefSeq (mRNA)	NM_001009570; NM_001166284; NM_001166285; NM_006429	NM_007638
RefSeq (protein)	NP_001009570; NP_001159756; NP_001159757; NP_006420	NP_031664
Location (UCSC)	Chr 2: 73.23 – 73.25 Mb	Chr 6: 85.43 – 85.45 Mb
PubMed search
- Wikidata
View/Edit Human	View/Edit Mouse

T-complex protein 1 subunit eta is a protein that in humans is encoded by the CCT7 gene.

== Function ==
This gene encodes a molecular chaperone that is a member of the TRiC complex. This complex consists of two identical stacked rings, each containing eight different proteins. Unfolded polypeptides enter the central cavity of the complex and are folded in an ATP-dependent manner. The complex folds various proteins, including actin and tubulin. Alternate transcriptional splice variants encoding different isoforms have been found for this gene, but only two of them have been characterized to date.

== Interactions ==
CCT7 has been shown to interact with PPP4C.
