= Chaperonin ATPase =

Class of enzymes

Identifiers
- EC no.: 3.6.4.9

Databases
- BRENDA: enzyme data
- ExPASy: NiceZyme view
- KEGG: enzyme entry
- MetaCyc: metabolic pathway
- Rhea: reactions
- PDB structures: RCSB PDB PDBe PDBsum
Search
- PMC: articles
- PubMed: articles
- NCBI: proteins

Chaperonin ATPase (EC 3.6.4.9, chaperonin) is an enzyme with systematic name ATP phosphohydrolase (polypeptide-unfolding). This enzyme catalyses the following chemical reaction

ATP + H_{2}O $\rightleftharpoons$ ADP + phosphate

These enzymes are a subclass of molecular chaperones.

== See also ==
- Chaperonin
