= T-complex protein 1 subunit epsilon =

Protein-coding gene in humans

CCT5
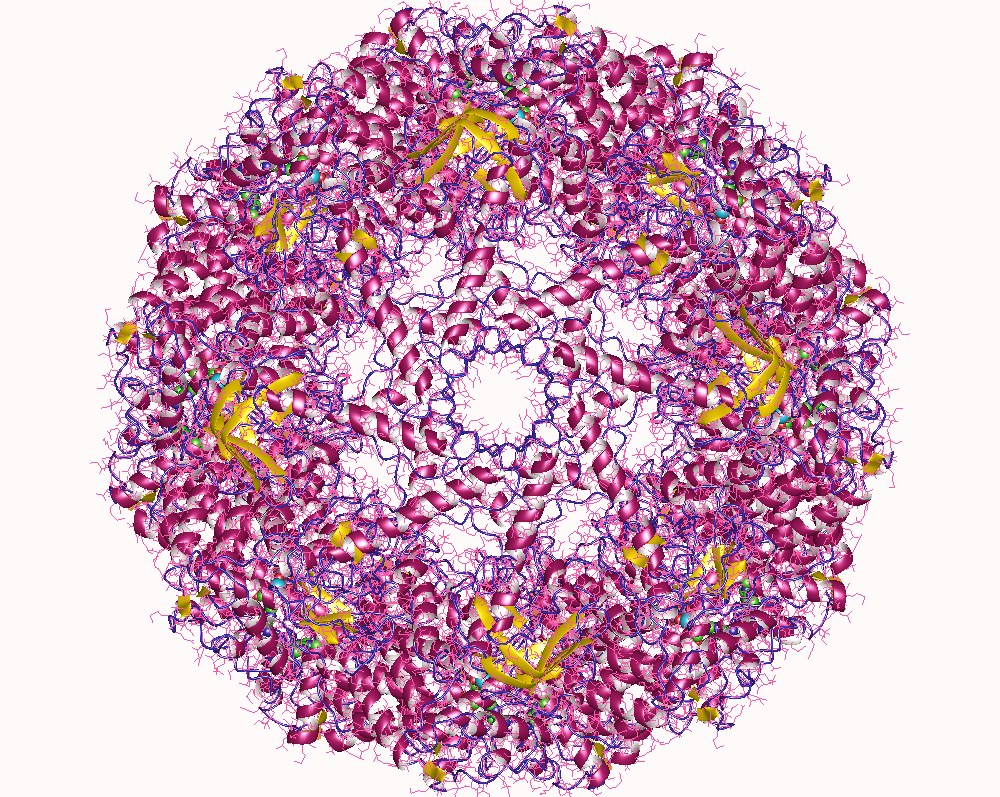

Identifiers
- Aliases: CCT5, CCT-epsilon, CCTE, HEL-S-69, TCP-1-epsilon, PNAS-102, chaperonin containing TCP1 subunit 5
- External IDs: OMIM: 610150; MGI: 107185; GeneCards: CCT5

Gene location (Human)
Chr.	Chromosome 5 (human)
Band	5p15.2	Start	10,249,929 bp
Band	5p15.2	End	10,266,389 bp

Gene location (Mouse)
Chr.	Chromosome 15 (mouse)
Band	15|15 B2	Start	31,590,946 bp
Band	15|15 B2	End	31,601,950 bp
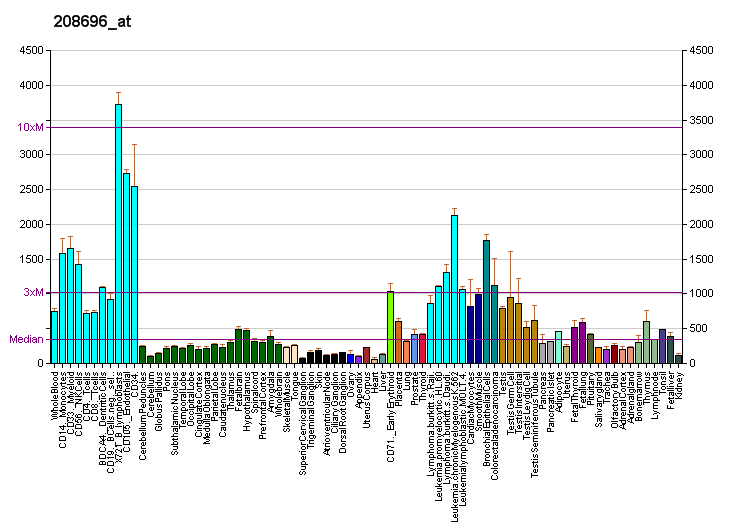
RNA expression pattern
Bgee	Human / Mouse (ortholog); Top expressed in: gonad; ventricular zone; embryo; ganglionic eminence; monocyte; rectum; smooth muscle tissue; right testis; islet of Langerhans; left testis / Top expressed in: primitive streak; somite; maxillary prominence; mandibular prominence; superior cervical ganglion; abdominal wall; Gonadal ridge; medial ganglionic eminence; vas deferens; hand; More reference expression data
BioGPS	More reference expression data
Gene ontology
Molecular function	nucleotide binding; G-protein beta-subunit binding; protein binding; beta-tubulin binding; ATP binding; protein folding chaperone activity; unfolded protein binding; mRNA 3'-UTR binding; mRNA 5'-UTR binding
Cellular component	cell body; centrosome; myelin sheath; microtubule organizing center; zona pellucida receptor complex; nucleolus; chaperonin-containing T-complex; microtubule; extracellular exosome; cytoskeleton; cytoplasm; cytosol
Biological process	positive regulation of protein localization to Cajal body; positive regulation of establishment of protein localization to telomere; response to virus; protein stabilization; positive regulation of telomere maintenance via telomerase; toxin transport; protein folding; positive regulation of telomerase RNA localization to Cajal body; binding of sperm to zona pellucida; 'de novo' protein folding; chaperone-mediated protein folding
Sources:Amigo / QuickGO
Orthologs
Databases	NCBI: entry; OMA: entry
Species	Human	Mouse
Entrez	22948	12465
Ensembl	ENSG00000150753	ENSMUSG00000022234
UniProt	P48643	P80316
RefSeq (mRNA)	NM_001306153; NM_001306154; NM_001306155; NM_001306156; NM_012073	NM_007637; NM_001348035
RefSeq (protein)	NP_001293082; NP_001293083; NP_001293084; NP_001293085; NP_036205	NP_001334964; NP_031663
Location (UCSC)	Chr 5: 10.25 – 10.27 Mb	Chr 15: 31.59 – 31.6 Mb
PubMed search
- Wikidata
View/Edit Human	View/Edit Mouse

T-complex protein 1 subunit epsilon is a protein that in humans is encoded by the CCT5 gene.

== Function ==
This gene encodes a molecular chaperone that is member of the TRiC complex. This complex consists of two identical stacked rings, each containing eight different proteins. Unfolded polypeptides enter the central cavity of the complex and are folded in an ATP-dependent manner. The complex folds various proteins, including actin and tubulin. Alternate transcriptional splice variants of this gene have been observed but have not been thoroughly characterized.

== Interactions ==
CCT5 has been shown to interact with PPP4C.
