= T-complex 1 =

Protein-coding gene in the species Homo sapiens

TCP1

Identifiers
- Aliases: TCP1, CCT-alpha, CCT1, CCTa, D6S230E, TCP-1-alpha, T-complex 1
- External IDs: OMIM: 186980; MGI: 98535; GeneCards: TCP1

Gene location (Human)
Chr.	Chromosome 6 (human)
Band	6q25.3	Start	159,778,498 bp
Band	6q25.3	End	159,789,703 bp

Gene location (Mouse)
Chr.	Chromosome 17 (mouse)
Band	17 A1|17 8.72 cM	Start	13,134,588 bp
Band	17 A1|17 8.72 cM	End	13,143,954 bp
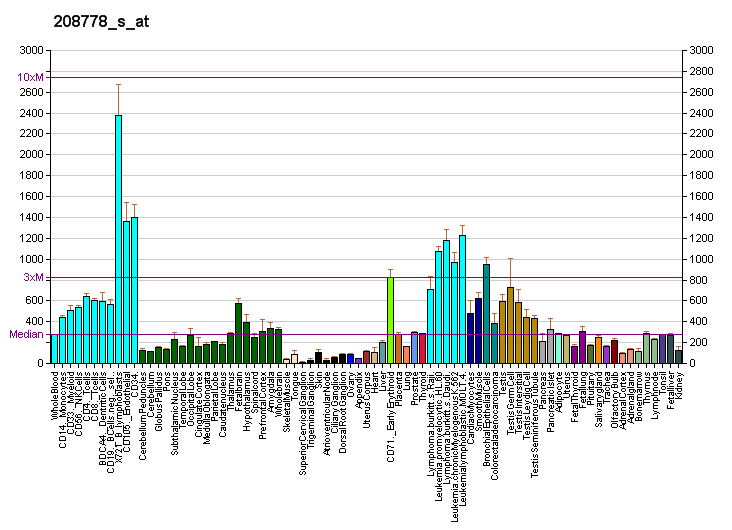

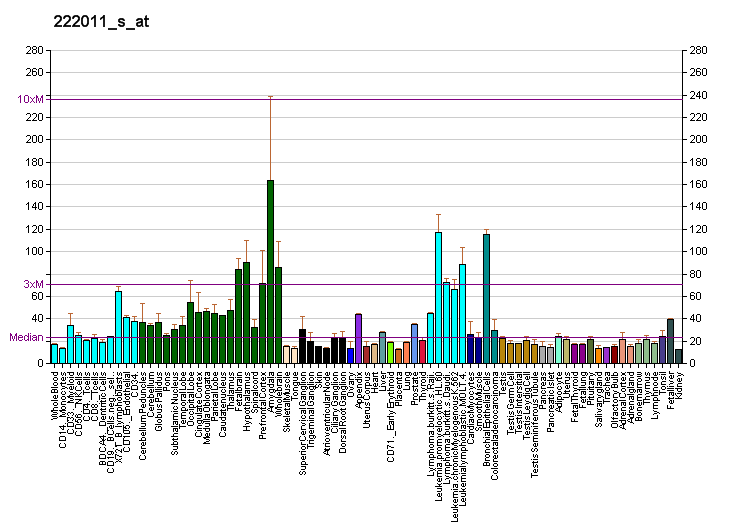

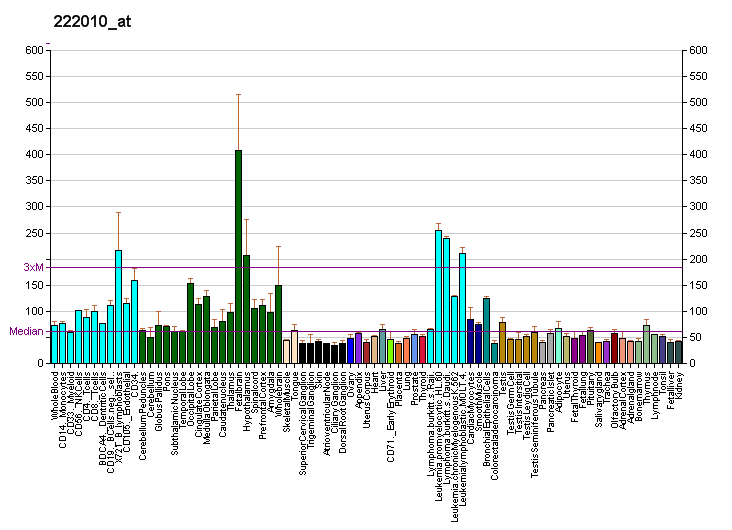
RNA expression pattern
Bgee	Human / Mouse (ortholog); Top expressed in: gonad; ganglionic eminence; left testis; right testis; ventricular zone; left ovary; gastric mucosa; right ovary; body of pancreas; skin of abdomen / Top expressed in: spermatid; spermatocyte; testicle; lens; genital tubercle; epiblast; tail of embryo; neural tube; mesencephalon; ventricular zone; More reference expression data
BioGPS	More reference expression data
Gene ontology
Molecular function	nucleotide binding; protein binding; ATP binding; ubiquitin protein ligase binding; protein folding chaperone activity; unfolded protein binding; RNA binding
Cellular component	cytoplasm; cell body; cytosol; centrosome; Golgi apparatus; pericentriolar material; myelin sheath; microtubule organizing center; zona pellucida receptor complex; heterochromatin; acrosomal vesicle; chaperonin-containing T-complex; microtubule; extracellular exosome; cytoskeleton
Biological process	tubulin complex assembly; positive regulation of protein localization to Cajal body; positive regulation of establishment of protein localization to telomere; scaRNA localization to Cajal body; regulation of macrophage apoptotic process; protein stabilization; positive regulation of telomere maintenance via telomerase; toxin transport; protein folding; positive regulation of telomerase activity; translocation of peptides or proteins into host cell cytoplasm; positive regulation of telomerase RNA localization to Cajal body; binding of sperm to zona pellucida; 'de novo' protein folding; chaperone-mediated protein folding; interleukin-12-mediated signaling pathway
Sources:Amigo / QuickGO
Orthologs
Databases	NCBI: entry; OMA: entry
Species	Human	Mouse
Entrez	6950	21454
Ensembl	ENSG00000120438	ENSMUSG00000068039
UniProt	P17987	P11983
RefSeq (mRNA)	NM_030752; NM_001008897	NM_001290712; NM_013686
RefSeq (protein)	NP_001008897; NP_110379	NP_001277641; NP_038714
Location (UCSC)	Chr 6: 159.78 – 159.79 Mb	Chr 17: 13.13 – 13.14 Mb
PubMed search
- Wikidata
View/Edit Human	View/Edit Mouse

T-complex protein 1 or T-complex protein 1 subunit alpha, abbreviated TCP1 or TCP-1, (Note: The term "TCP-1" is variously expanded as "T-complex protein 1" and "tailless complex polypeptide 1". The "T-complex" is the same as tailless complex, a CCT locus associated with tail length in mice.) is a protein that in humans is encoded by the TCP1 gene.

== Function ==
This protein is a member of TRiC (CCT) complex, which is a molecular chaperone and the chaperonin of eukaryotic cells. This complex consists of two identical stacked rings, each containing eight different proteins. Unfolded polypeptides enter the central cavity of the complex and are folded in an ATP-dependent manner. The complex folds various proteins, including actin and tubulin. Alternate transcriptional splice variants of this gene, encoding different isoforms, have been characterized.

== Interactions ==
TCP1 has been shown to interact with PPP4C and HDAC3. TRiC directly interacts with lectin type oxidized LDL receptor-1 (LOX-1) while its ligand oxidized low density lipoprotein (OxLDL) disassociates TRiC from LOX-1.
