= CCT3 =

Protein-coding gene in humans

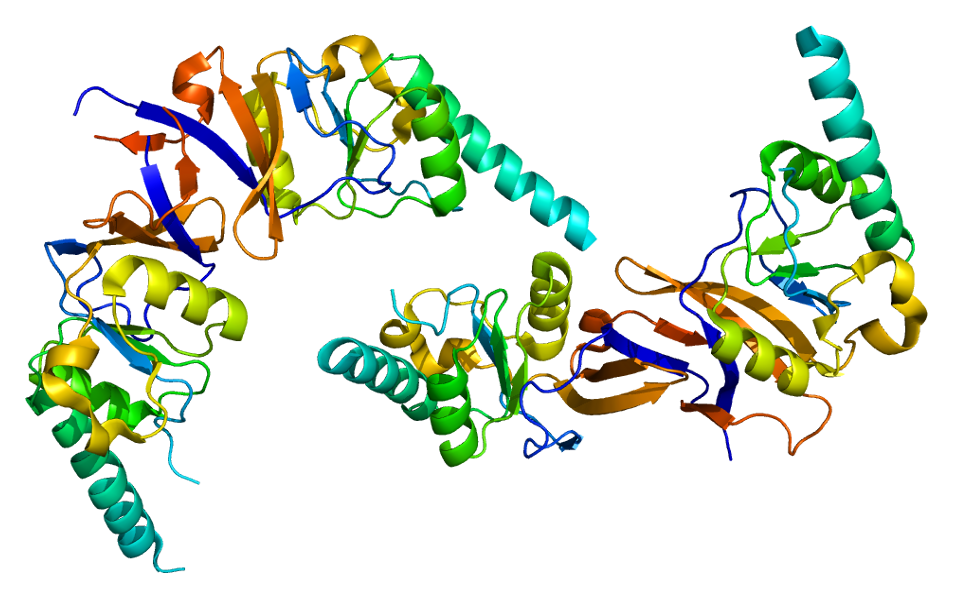

Identifiers
- Aliases: CCT3, CCT-gamma, CCTG, PIG48, TCP-1-gamma, TRIC5, chaperonin containing TCP1 subunit 3
- External IDs: OMIM: 600114; MGI: 104708; GeneCards: CCT3
Available structures
PDB	Ortholog search: PDBe RCSB
PDB	List of PDB id codes 1GML, 1GN1

Gene location (Human)
Chr.	Chromosome 1 (human)
Band	1q22	Start	156,308,968 bp
Band	1q22	End	156,367,873 bp

Gene location (Mouse)
Chr.	Chromosome 3 (mouse)
Band	3 F1|3 38.79 cM	Start	88,204,423 bp
Band	3 F1|3 38.79 cM	End	88,229,074 bp
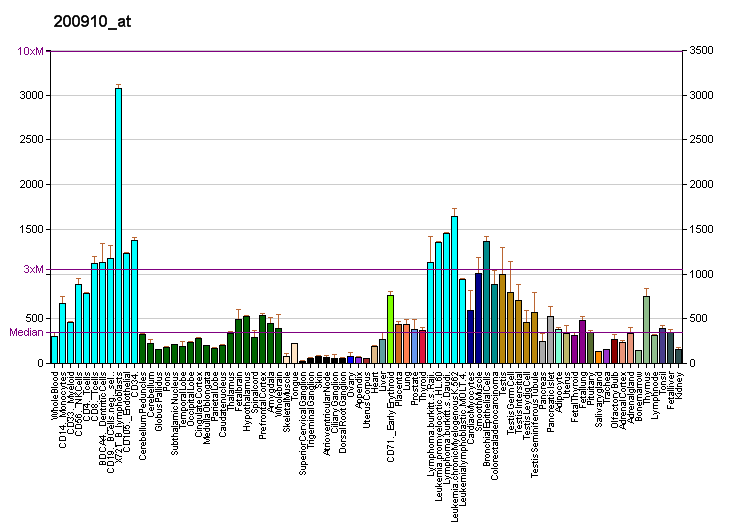
RNA expression pattern
Bgee	Human / Mouse (ortholog); Top expressed in: gonad; embryo; islet of Langerhans; ventricular zone; ganglionic eminence; right adrenal gland; smooth muscle tissue; right testis; left testis; right adrenal cortex / Top expressed in: primitive streak; otic placode; Paneth cell; maxillary prominence; saccule; mandibular prominence; otic vesicle; condyle; somite; spermatocyte; More reference expression data
BioGPS	More reference expression data
Gene ontology
Molecular function	nucleotide binding; protein folding chaperone activity; protein binding; ATP binding; unfolded protein binding; RNA binding
Cellular component	cell body; myelin sheath; plasma membrane; zona pellucida receptor complex; chaperonin-containing T-complex; microtubule; cytoskeleton; extracellular exosome; cytoplasm; cytosol
Biological process	positive regulation of protein localization to Cajal body; pore complex assembly; protein stabilization; positive regulation of telomere maintenance via telomerase; toxin transport; protein folding; positive regulation of telomerase RNA localization to Cajal body; binding of sperm to zona pellucida; 'de novo' protein folding; chaperone-mediated protein folding
Sources:Amigo / QuickGO
Orthologs
Databases	NCBI: entry; OMA: entry
Species	Human	Mouse
Entrez	7203	12462
Ensembl	ENSG00000163468	ENSMUSG00000001416
UniProt	P49368; Q5SZW8	P80318
RefSeq (mRNA)	NM_001008800; NM_001008883; NM_005998	NM_009836
RefSeq (protein)	NP_001008800; NP_005989	NP_033966
Location (UCSC)	Chr 1: 156.31 – 156.37 Mb	Chr 3: 88.2 – 88.23 Mb
PubMed search
- Wikidata
View/Edit Human	View/Edit Mouse

T-complex protein 1 subunit gamma is a protein that in humans is encoded by the CCT3 gene.

== Function ==
This gene encodes a molecular chaperone that is member of the TRiC complex. This complex consists of two identical stacked rings, each containing eight different proteins. Unfolded polypeptides enter the central cavity of the complex and are folded in an ATP-dependent manner. The complex folds various proteins, including actin and tubulin. Alternate transcriptional splice variants, encoding different isoforms, have been characterized.

== Interactions ==
CCT3 has been shown to interact with PPP4C.
