= CCT6B =

Protein-coding gene in humans

Identifiers
- Aliases: CCT6B, CCT-zeta-2, CCTZ-2, Cctz2, TCP-1-zeta-2, TSA303, chaperonin containing TCP1 subunit 6B
- External IDs: OMIM: 610730; MGI: 1329013; GeneCards: CCT6B

Gene location (Human)
Chr.	Chromosome 17 (human)
Band	17q12	Start	34,927,859 bp
Band	17q12	End	34,981,078 bp

Gene location (Mouse)
Chr.	Chromosome 11 (mouse)
Band	11|11 C	Start	82,610,076 bp
Band	11|11 C	End	82,655,147 bp
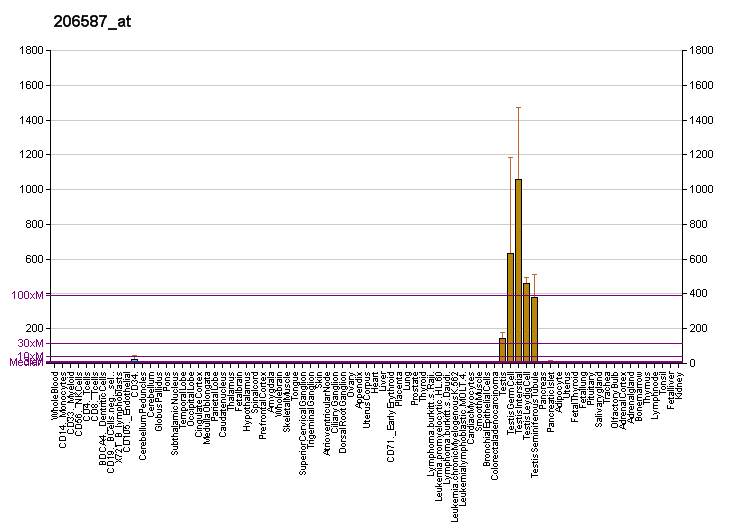
RNA expression pattern
Bgee	Human / Mouse (ortholog); Top expressed in: sperm; left testis; right testis; testicle; gonad; olfactory zone of nasal mucosa; Achilles tendon; gastrocnemius muscle; palpebral conjunctiva; gastric mucosa / Top expressed in: spermatid; spermatocyte; seminiferous tubule; blastocyst; embryo; Ileal epithelium; embryo; morula; morula; right kidney; More reference expression data
BioGPS	More reference expression data
Gene ontology
Molecular function	nucleotide binding; ATP binding; protein folding chaperone activity; unfolded protein binding
Cellular component	cytoplasm; cytosol; chaperonin-containing T-complex
Biological process	toxin transport; protein folding; chaperone-mediated protein complex assembly; spermatogenesis; protein transport; 'de novo' protein folding; chaperone-mediated protein folding
Sources:Amigo / QuickGO
Orthologs
Databases	NCBI: entry; OMA: entry
Species	Human	Mouse
Entrez	10693	12467
Ensembl	ENSG00000132141	ENSMUSG00000020698
UniProt	Q92526	Q61390
RefSeq (mRNA)	NM_001193529; NM_001193530; NM_006584	NM_001291242; NM_009839
RefSeq (protein)	NP_001180458; NP_001180459; NP_006575	NP_001278171; NP_033969
Location (UCSC)	Chr 17: 34.93 – 34.98 Mb	Chr 11: 82.61 – 82.66 Mb
PubMed search
- Wikidata
View/Edit Human	View/Edit Mouse

T-complex protein 1 subunit zeta-2 is a protein that in humans is encoded by the CCT6B gene.

This gene encodes a molecular chaperone that is a member of the TRiC complex. This complex consists of two identical stacked rings, each containing eight different proteins. Unfolded polypeptides enter the central cavity of the complex and are folded in an ATP-dependent manner. The complex folds various proteins, including actin and tubulin. Alternate transcriptional splice variants of this gene have been observed but have not been thoroughly characterized.
