= Steroid-transporting ATPase =

Identifiers
- EC no.: 3.6.3.45

Databases
- IntEnz: IntEnz view
- BRENDA: BRENDA entry
- ExPASy: NiceZyme view
- KEGG: KEGG entry
- MetaCyc: metabolic pathway
- PRIAM: profile
- PDB structures: RCSB PDB PDBe PDBsum
Search
- PMC: articles
- PubMed: articles
- NCBI: proteins

Steroid-transporting ATPase (EC 3.6.3.45, pleiotropic-drug-resistance protein, PDR protein) is an enzyme with systematic name ATP phosphohydrolase (steroid-exporting). This enzyme catalyses the following chemical reaction

ATP + H_{2}O + steroidin $\rightleftharpoons$ ADP + phosphate + steroidout

This enzyme has two similar ATP-binding domains.
