= CCT2 (gene) =

Protein-coding gene in humans

Identifiers
- Aliases: CCT2, 99D8.1, CCT-beta, CCTB, HEL-S-100n, PRO1633, TCP-1-beta, chaperonin containing TCP1 subunit 2
- External IDs: OMIM: 605139; MGI: 107186; GeneCards: CCT2

Gene location (Human)
Chr.	Chromosome 12 (human)
Band	12q15	Start	69,585,426 bp
Band	12q15	End	69,601,570 bp

Gene location (Mouse)
Chr.	Chromosome 10 (mouse)
Band	10|10 D2	Start	116,886,906 bp
Band	10|10 D2	End	116,899,719 bp
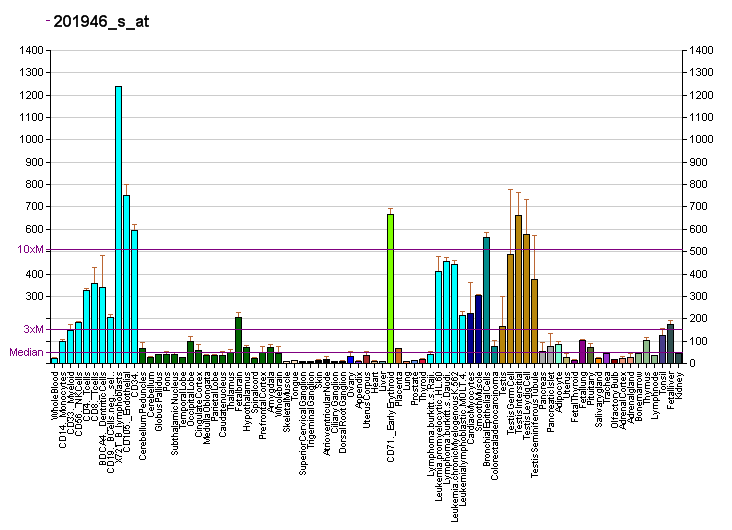

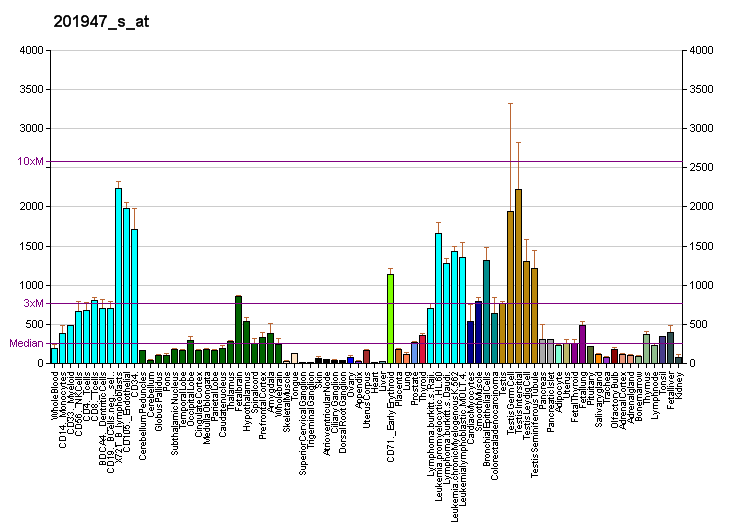
RNA expression pattern
Bgee	Human / Mouse (ortholog); Top expressed in: sperm; gonad; epithelium of nasopharynx; right testis; left testis; embryo; ganglionic eminence; ventricular zone; gingival epithelium; bronchial epithelial cell / Top expressed in: superior cervical ganglion; primitive streak; maxillary prominence; mandibular prominence; abdominal wall; hand; endothelial cell of lymphatic vessel; trigeminal ganglion; renal corpuscle; medullary collecting duct; More reference expression data
BioGPS	More reference expression data
Gene ontology
Molecular function	nucleotide binding; protein folding chaperone activity; protein binding; ATP binding; ubiquitin protein ligase binding; unfolded protein binding
Cellular component	cell body; myelin sheath; zona pellucida receptor complex; chaperonin-containing T-complex; microtubule; extracellular exosome; extracellular matrix; extracellular region; cytoplasm; cytosol; azurophil granule lumen
Biological process	chaperone mediated protein folding independent of cofactor; chaperone-mediated protein complex assembly; positive regulation of protein localization to Cajal body; positive regulation of establishment of protein localization to telomere; scaRNA localization to Cajal body; protein stabilization; positive regulation of telomere maintenance via telomerase; toxin transport; protein folding; positive regulation of telomerase activity; positive regulation of telomerase RNA localization to Cajal body; binding of sperm to zona pellucida; neutrophil degranulation
Sources:Amigo / QuickGO
Orthologs
Databases	NCBI: entry; OMA: entry
Species	Human	Mouse
Entrez	10576	12461
Ensembl	ENSG00000166226	ENSMUSG00000034024
UniProt	P78371	P80314
RefSeq (mRNA)	NM_006431; NM_001198842	NM_007636; NM_001358767
RefSeq (protein)	NP_001185771; NP_006422	NP_031662; NP_001345696
Location (UCSC)	Chr 12: 69.59 – 69.6 Mb	Chr 10: 116.89 – 116.9 Mb
PubMed search
- Wikidata
View/Edit Human	View/Edit Mouse

T-complex protein 1 subunit beta is a protein that in humans is encoded by the CCT2 gene.

== Function ==
This gene encodes a molecular chaperone that is member of the TRiC complex. This complex consists of two identical stacked rings, each containing eight different proteins. Unfolded polypeptides enter the central cavity of the complex and are folded in an ATP-dependent manner. The complex folds various proteins, including actin and tubulin. Alternate transcriptional splice variants of the gene described in this record have been observed but have not been thoroughly characterized.

== Interactions ==
CCT2 (gene) has been shown to interact with PPP4C.
