= Chaperone DnaJ =

Molecular chaperone protein

DnaJ domain
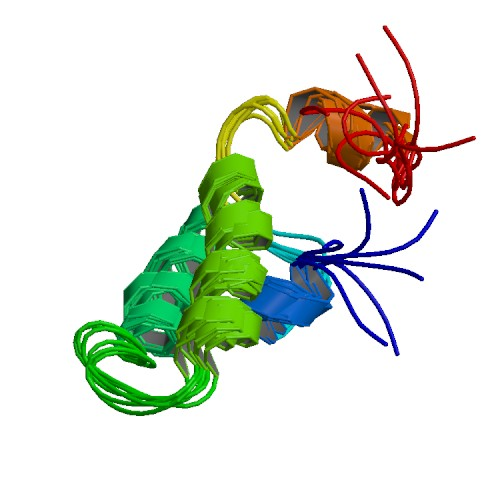
- PDB rendering based on 1hdj.

Identifiers
- Symbol: DnaJ
- Pfam: PF00226
- InterPro: IPR001623
- PROSITE: PDOC00553
- SCOP2: 1xbl / SCOPe / SUPFAM
- CDD: cd06257
- Membranome: 177
Available protein structures:
- PDB: IPR001623 PF00226 (ECOD; PDBsum)
- AlphaFold: IPR001623; PF00226

DnaJ central domain

Identifiers
- Symbol: DnaJ_CXXCXGXG
- Pfam: PF00684
- Pfam clan: CL0518
- InterPro: IPR001305
- PROSITE: PDOC00553
- SCOP2: 1exk / SCOPe / SUPFAM
Available protein structures:
- PDB: IPR001305 PF00684 (ECOD; PDBsum)
- AlphaFold: IPR001305; PF00684

DnaJ C terminal domain
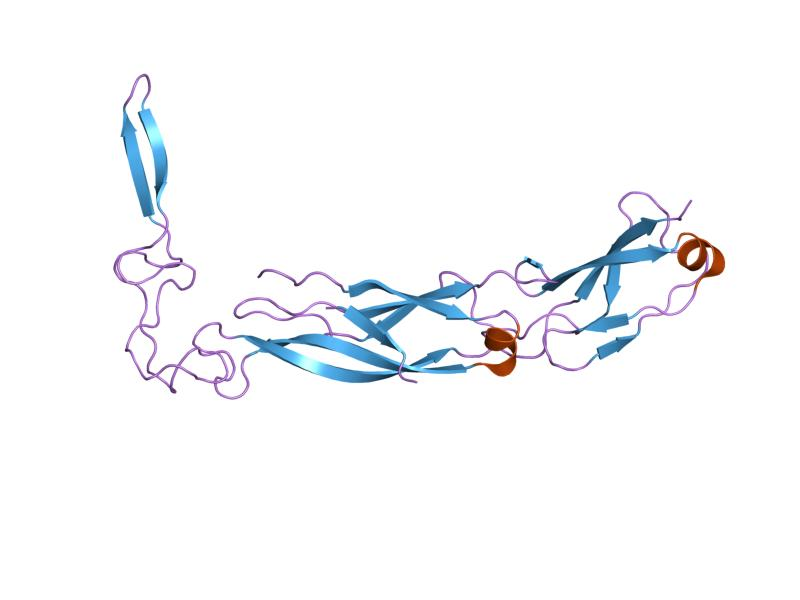
- the crystal structure of hsp40 ydj1

Identifiers
- Symbol: DnaJ_C
- Pfam: PF01556
- InterPro: IPR002939
- PROSITE: PDOC00553
- SCOP2: 1exk / SCOPe / SUPFAM
Available protein structures:
- PDB: IPR002939 PF01556 (ECOD; PDBsum)
- AlphaFold: IPR002939; PF01556

In molecular biology, chaperone DnaJ, also known as Hsp40 (heat shock protein 40 kDa), is a molecular chaperone protein. It is expressed in a wide variety of organisms from bacteria to humans.

== Function ==
Molecular chaperones are a diverse family of proteins that function to protect proteins from irreversible aggregation during synthesis and in times of cellular stress. The bacterial molecular chaperone DnaK is an enzyme that couples cycles of ATP binding, hydrolysis, and ADP release by an N-terminal ATP-hydrolyzing domain to cycles of sequestration and release of unfolded proteins by a C-terminal substrate binding domain. Dimeric GrpE is the co-chaperone for DnaK, and acts as a nucleotide exchange factor, stimulating the rate of ADP release 5000-fold. DnaK is itself a weak ATPase; ATP hydrolysis by DnaK is stimulated by its interaction with another co-chaperone, DnaJ. Thus the co-chaperones DnaJ and GrpE are capable of tightly regulating the nucleotide-bound and substrate-bound state of DnaK in ways that are necessary for the normal housekeeping functions and stress-related functions of the DnaK molecular chaperone cycle.

This family of proteins contain a 70 amino acid consensus sequence known as the J domain. The J domain of DnaJ interacts with Hsp70 heat shock proteins. DnaJ heat-shock proteins play a role in regulating the ATPase activity of Hsp70 heat-shock proteins.

Besides stimulating the ATPase activity of DnaK through its J-domain, DnaJ also associates with unfolded polypeptide chains and prevents their aggregation. Thus, DnaK and DnaJ may bind to one and the same polypeptide chain to form a ternary complex. The formation of a ternary complex may result in cis-interaction of the J-domain of DnaJ with the ATPase domain of DnaK. An unfolded polypeptide may enter the chaperone cycle by associating first either with ATP-liganded DnaK or with DnaJ. DnaK interacts with both the backbone and side chains of a peptide substrate; it thus shows binding polarity and admits only L-peptide segments. In contrast, DnaJ has been shown to bind both L- and D-peptides and is assumed to interact only with the side chains of the substrate.

== Domain architecture ==
Proteins in this family consist of three domains. The N-terminal domain is the J domain (described above). The central domain is a cysteine-rich region, which contains four repeats of the motif CXXCXGXG where X is any amino acid. The isolated cysteine rich domain folds in zinc dependent fashion. Each set of two repeats binds one unit of zinc. Although this domain has been implicated in substrate binding, no evidence of specific interaction between the isolated DNAJ cysteine rich domain and various hydrophobic peptides has been found. This domain has disulphide isomerase activity. The function of the C-terminal is chaperone and dimerization.

== Proteins containing a DnaJ domain ==
- Homo sapiens: DNAJA1; DNAJA2; DNAJA3; DNAJA4 (MST104); DNAJB1; DNAJB11; DNAJB13; DNAJB4; DNAJB5; DNAJB6; DNAJC17; DNAJC28
- Saccharomyces cerevisiae: ZUO1
