= HSPA1B =

Human gene

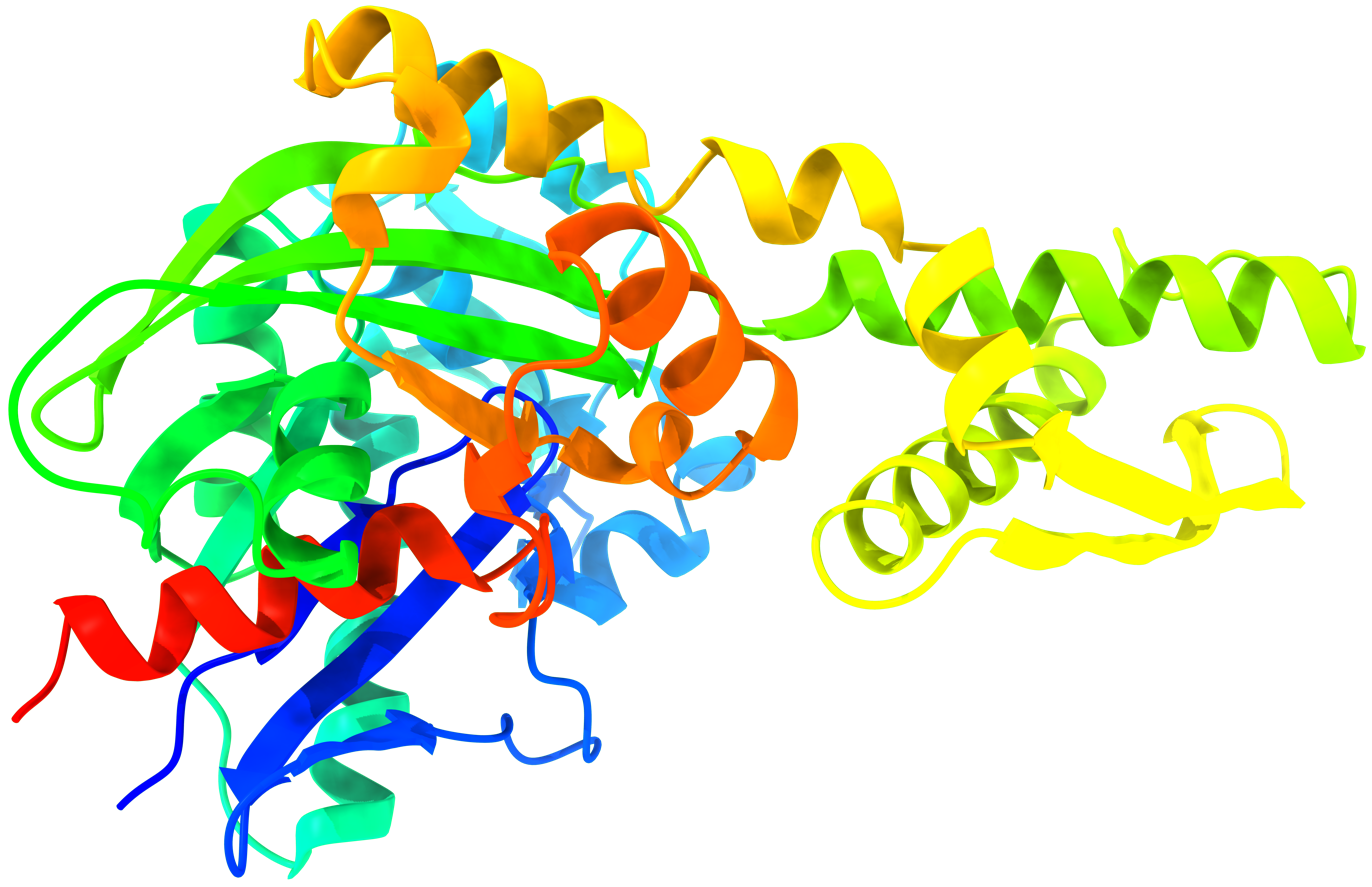

Identifiers
- Aliases: HSPA1B, HSP70-1B, HSP70-2, HSP70.2, heat shock protein family A (Hsp70) member 1B, HSX70, HSPA1, HSP70-1, HSP72, HSP70.1
- External IDs: OMIM: 603012; MGI: 96244; GeneCards: HSPA1B
Available structures
PDB	Ortholog search: PDBe RCSB
PDB	List of PDB id codes 1HJO, 1S3X, 1XQS, 2E88, 2E8A, 2LMG, 3A8Y, 3ATU, 3ATV, 3AY9, 3D2E, 3D2F, 3JXU, 3LOF, 4IO8, 4J8F, 4PO2, 4WV5, 4WV7, 5AR0, 5AQZ, 3Q49,%%s3D2E

Gene location (Human)
Chr.	Chromosome 6 (human)
Band	6p21.33	Start	31,827,738 bp
Band	6p21.33	End	31,830,254 bp

Gene location (Mouse)
Chr.	Chromosome 17 (mouse)
Band	17 B1|17 18.51 cM	Start	35,188,166 bp
Band	17 B1|17 18.51 cM	End	35,191,132 bp
RNA expression pattern
Bgee	Human / Mouse (ortholog); Top expressed in: ventricular zone; gallbladder; ganglionic eminence; mucosa of transverse colon; gastric mucosa; C1 segment; hypothalamus; right uterine tube; pituitary gland; substantia nigra / Top expressed in: corneal stroma; conjunctival fornix; vestibular membrane of cochlear duct; ciliary body; plantaris muscle; retinal pigment epithelium; skin of external ear; Ileal epithelium; iris; esophagus; More reference expression data
BioGPS	n/a
Gene ontology
Molecular function	nucleotide binding; heat shock protein binding; signaling receptor binding; C3HC4-type RING finger domain binding; ATPase activity; virus receptor activity; histone deacetylase binding; protein folding chaperone activity; G protein-coupled receptor binding; ATP binding; enzyme binding; ubiquitin protein ligase binding; protein binding; transcription corepressor activity; cadherin binding; RNA binding; denatured protein binding; protein N-terminus binding; unfolded protein binding; disordered domain specific binding; misfolded protein binding
Cellular component	blood microparticle; centriole; nucleoplasm; inclusion body; focal adhesion; perinuclear region of cytoplasm; ubiquitin ligase complex; cytosol; extracellular region; ficolin-1-rich granule lumen; centrosome; microtubule organizing center; cytoskeleton; nucleus; cytoplasm; mitochondrion; endoplasmic reticulum; aggresome; nuclear speck; vesicle; extracellular exosome; COP9 signalosome; protein-containing complex; ribonucleoprotein complex
Biological process	cellular response to oxidative stress; regulation of mRNA stability; negative regulation of endoplasmic reticulum stress-induced intrinsic apoptotic signaling pathway; positive regulation of NF-kappaB transcription factor activity; negative regulation of mitochondrial outer membrane permeabilization involved in apoptotic signaling pathway; cellular heat acclimation; negative regulation of inclusion body assembly; positive regulation of tumor necrosis factor-mediated signaling pathway; negative regulation of cell death; positive regulation of gene expression; viral entry into host cell; regulation of cell death; ATP metabolic process; negative regulation of protein ubiquitination; negative regulation of extrinsic apoptotic signaling pathway in absence of ligand; positive regulation of endoribonuclease activity; positive regulation of nucleotide-binding oligomerization domain containing 2 signaling pathway; regulation of protein ubiquitination; positive regulation of interleukin-8 production; regulation of cellular response to heat; cellular response to heat; negative regulation of transforming growth factor beta receptor signaling pathway; positive regulation of proteasomal ubiquitin-dependent protein catabolic process; neutrophil degranulation; negative regulation of transcription from RNA polymerase II promoter in response to stress; protein refolding; positive regulation of microtubule nucleation; regulation of mitotic spindle assembly; mRNA catabolic process; response to unfolded protein; negative regulation of cell population proliferation; negative regulation of cell growth; negative regulation of apoptotic process; protein stabilization; chaperone-mediated protein complex assembly; positive regulation of RNA splicing; Unfolded protein response; positive regulation of erythrocyte differentiation; chaperone cofactor-dependent protein refolding; lysosomal transport; response to heat; telomere maintenance; DNA repair
Sources:Amigo / QuickGO
Orthologs
Databases	NCBI: entry; OMA: entry
Species	Human	Mouse
Entrez	3304	193740
Ensembl	ENSG00000232804; ENSG00000224501; ENSG00000212866; ENSG00000204388; ENSG00000231555 n/a	ENSMUSG00000091971
UniProt	P0DMV8; P0DMV9	Q61696
RefSeq (mRNA)	NM_005346	NM_010479
RefSeq (protein)	NP_005337; NP_005336; NP_005336; NP_005336.3; NP_005337.2	NP_034609
Location (UCSC)	Chr 6: 31.83 – 31.83 Mb	Chr 17: 35.19 – 35.19 Mb
PubMed search
- Wikidata
View/Edit Human	View/Edit Mouse

Human gene HSPA1B is an intron-less gene which encodes for the heat shock protein HSP70-2, a member of the Hsp70 family of proteins. The gene is located in the major histocompatibility complex, on the short arm of chromosome 6, in a cluster with two paralogous genes, HSPA1A and HSPA1L. HSPA1A and HSPA1B produce nearly identical proteins because the few differences in their DNA sequences are almost exclusively synonymous substitutions or in the three prime untranslated region, heat shock 70kDa protein 1A, from HSPA1A, and heat shock 70kDa protein 1B, from HSPA1B. A third, more modified paralog to these genes exists in the same region, HSPA1L, which shares a 90% homology with the other two.

== Function ==
Heat shock 70kDa protein 1B is a chaperone protein, cooperating with other heat shock proteins and chaperone systems to maintain proteostasis by stabilizing the structural conformation of other proteins in the cell and protecting against stress-induced aggregation. Hsp70s have also been shown to bind and stabilize mRNA rich in adenine and uracil bases, independent of the occupational states of its other binding sites. This protein is deactivated by binding ATP, and activated by its dephosphorylation to ADP, which requires a potassium ion to facilitate the hydrolysis, or ATP-ADP exchange.

Hsp70-2 specifically is developmentally expressed in male germ line cells during meiosis, where it is necessary for the formation of the complex between CDC2 and cyclin B1. It later becomes incorporated into the CatSper complex, a specialized calcium ion channel that enables spermatozoa motility.

== Clinical significance ==
Infertility has been observed in mice when HSA1B expression is disrupted, as CDC2 in unable to form the required heterodimer with cyclin B1 for the meiotic cell cycle to progress beyond S phase.

Expression of heat shock protein 70kDa protein 2 in transformed tumor cells has been implicated in the rapid proliferation, metastasis, and inhibition of apoptosis in ovarian, bladder urothelial, and breast cancers. Patients with chronic hepatitis B or hepatitis C virus infection who harbor a HSPA1B-1267 single nucleotide polymorphism have a higher risk for developing hepatocellular carcinoma.

== Interactions ==
Interactions have been characterized between Hsp70-2 and the following proteins:

- ATF5,
- BAG1,
- BAG2,
- BAG3,
- CatSperβ,
- CDC2,
- CHCHD3,
- DNAJC7,
- DNAJC8,
- DNAJC9,
- FOXP3,
- HDAC4,
- HOPX,
- HSP40,
- HSP90,
- HSP105,
- IRAK1BP1,
- METTL21A,
- NAA10,
- NEDD1,
- NOD2,
- PPP5C,
- PKRN,
- SMAD3,
- STUB1,
- TERT,
- TRIM5,
- TSC2,

== See also ==
- Heat shock proteins
- Hsp70
