= GrpE =

InterPro Family

GrpE Protein
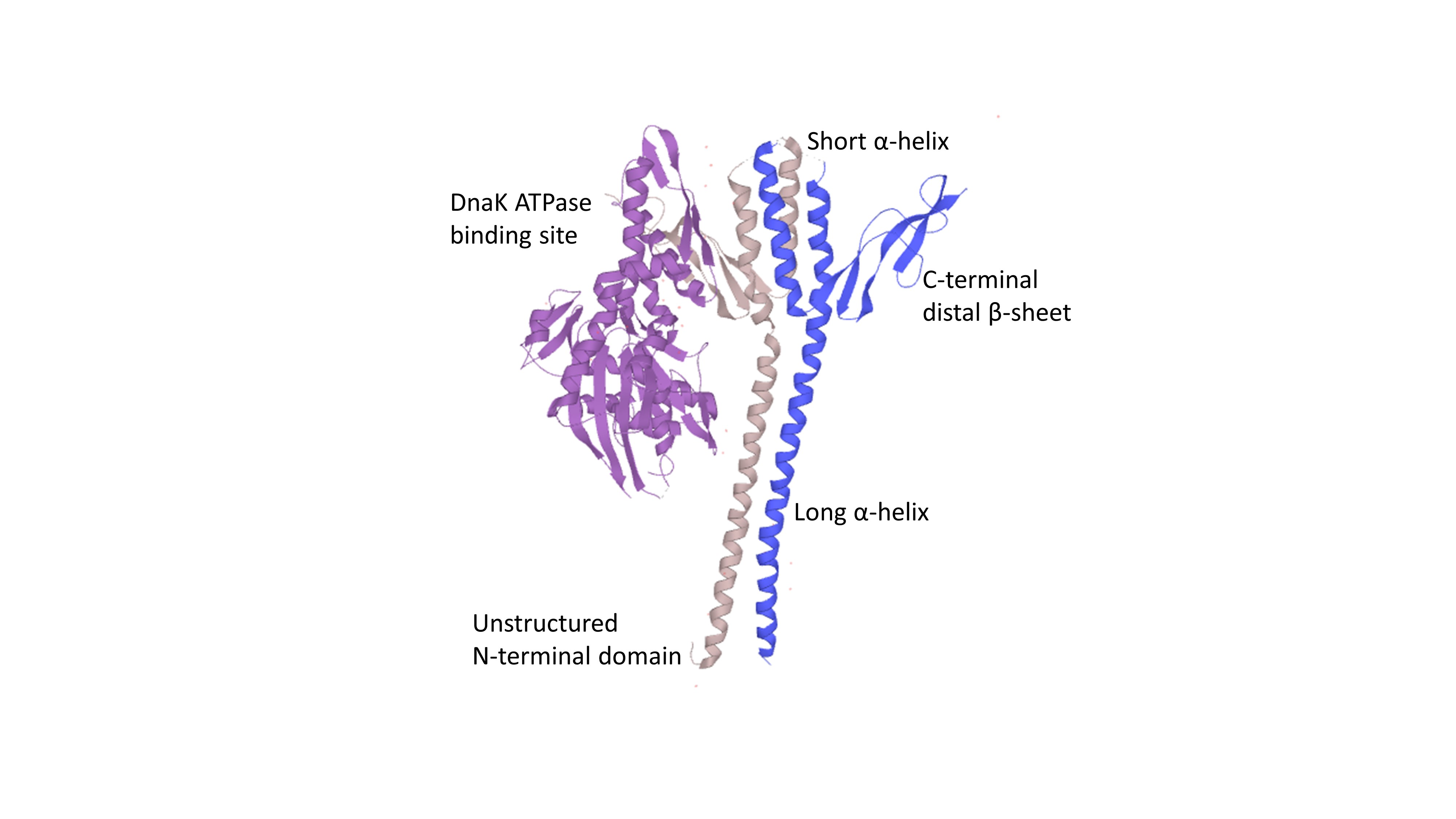
- Crystal structure of GrpE homodimer interacting with ATPase binding site of DnaK, resolved at 2.8 angstrom.

Identifiers
- Symbol: GrpE
- Pfam: PF01025
- InterPro: IPR000740
- PROSITE: PS01071
- SCOP2: 1dkg / SCOPe / SUPFAM
- CDD: cd00446
Available protein structures:
- PDB: IPR000740 PF01025 (ECOD; PDBsum)
- AlphaFold: IPR000740; PF01025

GrpE (Gro-P like protein E) is a bacterial nucleotide exchange factor that is important for regulation of protein folding machinery, as well as the heat shock response. It is a heat-inducible protein and during stress it prevents unfolded proteins from accumulating in the cytoplasm. Accumulation of unfolded proteins in the cytoplasm can lead to cell death.

== Discovery ==
GrpE is a nucleotide exchange factor that was discovered by researchers in 1977 as a protein necessary to propagate bacteriophage λ, a virus that infects bacteria by hijacking the bacteria's replication machinery, in Escherichia coli. By using a genetic screen, researchers knocked out certain genes in E. coli and then tested whether the bacteria were able to replicate, GrpE was found to be crucial to propagation. Since that time, GrpE has been identified in all bacteria and in Archaea where DnaK and DnaJ are present.

The crystal structure of GrpE was determined in 1997 at 2.8 Angstrom and identified GrpE as a homodimer that binds DnaK, a heat-shock protein involved in de novo protein folding. GrpE's structure determination was important because it demonstrated the interaction of nucleotide exchange factors at the nucleotide-binding domain of DnaK.

== Structure ==
=== Functional domains ===
The GrpE homodimer has three distinct domains:

- N-terminal disordered regions — Amino acids 1-33 in the N-terminal domain can compete for binding to the substrate binding cleft of DnaK. Amino acids 34-39 have not been visualized because they are either too disordered or too unstructured to be crystallized.
- α-helices — There are four α-helices, two short and two long, these are stalk-like and parallel to each other. These helices come together to form a helical bundle however, there is no superhelical twisting due to the heptad-hendecad (7-11-7-11) spacing of hydrophobic residues in these helices. Portions of this helical bundle are able to bind to Domain IIB of DnaK. These helices also act as thermosensors.
- C-terminal β-sheets — There are two compact β-sheets which stick out from the helices like arms. The β-sheet proximal to DnaK interacts with its ATP binding cleft directly by inserting itself into the cleft and causing a conformational shift in Domain IIB causing the release of ADP. The distal β-sheet does not interact with DnaK.

=== Binding induces a conformational change ===
Binding of GrpE's proximal β-sheet to Domain IIB of DnaK causes a 14° outward rotation of the nucleotide binding cleft, disrupting the binding of three side chains to the adenine and ribose rings of the nucleotide. This conformational change shifts DnaK from a closed to an open conformation and allows the release of ADP from the binding cleft.

== Function ==
=== Nucleotide exchange factor ===
Nucleotide exchange factors are proteins that catalyze the release of adenosine diphosphate (ADP) to facilitate binding of adenosine triphosphate (ATP). ATP has three phosphate groups and the removal of one of the phosphate groups releases energy which is used to fuel a reaction. This removal of a phosphate group reduces ATP to ADP. GrpE is a nucleotide exchange factor that causes the release of bound ADP from DnaK, a heat shock protein important in de novo protein folding. DnaK, in its open conformation, binds ATP with low affinity and has a fast exchange rate for unfolded proteins. Once DnaJ, a co-chaperone, brings an unfolded protein to DnaK ATP is hydrolyzed to ADP to facilitate folding of the protein. At this point, the DnaK•ADP complex is in a stable conformation and requires GrpE to bind DnaK, change its conformation, and release ADP from the N-terminal ATPase domain of DnaK. Once ADP is released from the cycle is able to continue.

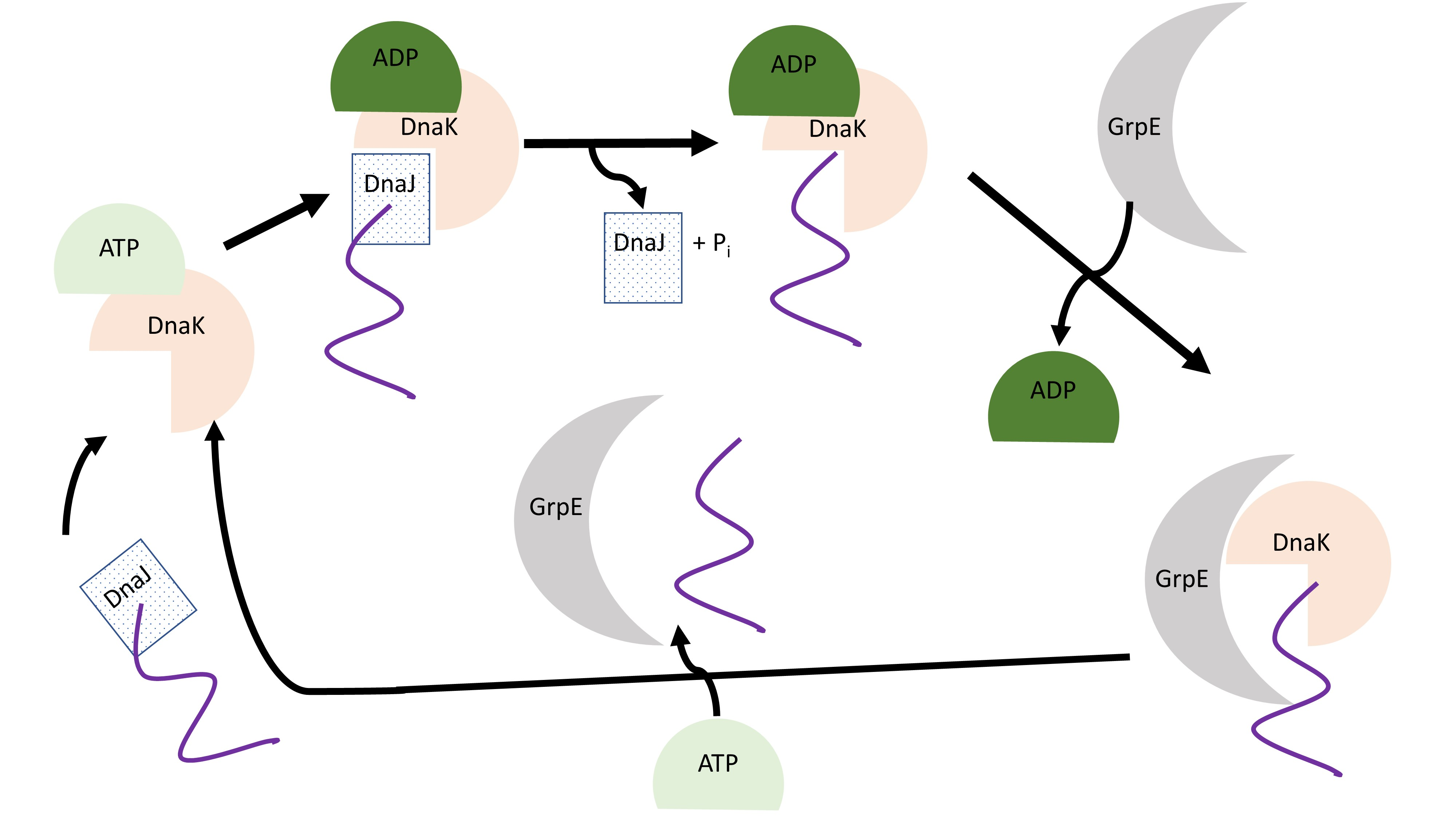
Co-chaperone DnaJ brings in unfolded protein to the substrate binding site of DnaK and hydrolyzes ATP, DnaJ and inorganic phosphate are released. GrpE then interacts with the nucleotide binding cleft of DnaK to induce a conformational change leading to ADP release and substrate release.

==== Kinetics ====
The interaction between GrpE and the nucleotide binding cleft of DnaK is strong with a K_{d} between 1 nM (assessed during active conformation using transient kinetics) and a K_{d} of 30 nM (based on inactive conformation through surface plasmon resonance). This low dissociation constant indicates that GrpE readily binds to DnaK. Binding of GrpE to DnaK•ADP greatly reduces the affinity of ADP for DnaK by 200-fold and accelerates the rate of nucleotide release by 5000-fold. This process facilitates the de novo folding of unfolded protein by DnaK.

=== Protein Folding ===
GrpE also has an important role in substrate release from DnaK. The disordered N-terminal region of GrpE competes for binding to DnaK's substrate binding cleft. Researchers mutated GrpE to identify the function of its structural domains. Mutated GrpE, without its disordered N-terminal domain, is still able to bind to DnaK's nucleotide binding cleft and induce a conformational change however, the substrate will not be released.

=== Thermosensor ===
GrpE is a nucleotide exchange factor for DnaK, a heat shock protein, its activity is downregulated with increasing temperature. In biology, reversible unfolding of α-helices begins at 35 °C with a midpoint T_{m} of 50 °C, this unfolding affects the structural integrity of GrpE and prevents binding of GrpE to the nucleotide binding cleft of DnaK This has an important physiological role to limit the substrate cycling and subsequent ATP expenditure during heat stress. The thermal regulation of DnaK slows protein folding and prevents unfolded proteins from accumulating in the cytoplasm at high temperatures.

=== Bacteriophage λ replication ===
GrpE was first identified for its role in phage λ replication. GrpE that has been mutated so that it is nonfunctional prevents phage λ replication in vivo and greatly decreases replication in vitro. In vitro overexpression of DnaK can recover phage λ replication without GrpE. GrpE's pivotal role in phage λ replication is at the origin of replication, after assembly of DnaB and other replication factors, GrpE facilitates bidirectional DNA unwinding through interaction with DnaK.

== Regulation ==
=== Transcription ===
In the Archaea genome, the gene for GrpE is located upstream of the gene for DnaK which, is upstream of the gene for DnaJ. Out of these three proteins, only the promoter region of GrpE has a complete TATA binding box and upstream heat-responsive binding site. This suggests that, in Archaea, these three genes are transcribed at the same time.

In E. coli, GrpE's transcription is regulated by binding of the heat-shock specific subunit of RNA polymerase, σ^{32}. Under physiological conditions, σ^{32} is kept at low levels through inactivation by interacting with DnaK and DnaJ, then subsequent degradation by proteases. However, during heat shock these proteins are unable to interact with σ^{32} and target it for degradation. Therefore, during heat shock, σ^{32} binds to the promoter region of heat shock proteins and causes rapid induction of these genes.

== Other biological systems ==
=== Eukaryote homologues ===
In Saccharomyces cerevisiae, the GrpE homologue, Mge1, is found in mitochondria. Mge1 is a nucleotide exchange factor important for shuttling proteins across mitochondrial membranes and in protein folding, it interacts with a yeast homologue of DnaK. Mge1 has a similar role as a thermosensor. Yeast have additional GrpE homologues including Sil1p and Fes1p. In humans, mitochondrial organelles have GrpE-like 1 (GRPEL1) protein.

In eukaryotic cells, there any many additional eukaryotic GrpE homologues. Members of the BAG family specifically, BAG1 are the main nucleotide exchange factors for heat shock protein 70kDa (Hsp70), which is the eukaryotic equivalent of DnaK. Other nucleotide exchange factors that interact with heat-shock proteins in eukaryotes include, Sse1p, Sil1p, Hip, and HspBP1. These eukaryotic nucleotide exchange factors are all heat-shock inducible meaning that they serve a similar function as GrpE, to protect the cell from unfolded protein aggregation. These nucleotide exchange factors always interact with subdomain IIB of the nucleotide binding cleft of their respective heat-shock proteins. The binding of the nucleotide exchange factor to a nucleotide binding cleft and the shift to an open conformation is conserved between prokaryotes and eukaryotes.

=== Plant homologues ===
In plants, GrpE homologues, CGE1 and CGE2, are found in chloroplasts. CGE1 has two splice isoforms that differ in 6 amino acids in the N-terminal, with isoform CGE1b being 6 nucleotides longer than CGE1a. This N-terminal domain is important in substrate release through competitive binding to the heat-shock protein. All of these plant nucleotide exchange factors interact directly with the cpHsc70, the plant homologue of DnaK. They are heat-inducible however, at 43 °C, they are not as effective as GrpE at protecting the cell from unfolded protein accumulation.

== Role in disease ==
=== Bacterial pathogenesis ===
Enterococci are bacteria that are commonly found in the gastrointestinal tract of animals, including humans. These bacteria can form a biofilm, which is a layer of bacteria attached to a surface. Enterococcal biofilm is prevalent in hospital and surgical settings, it is responsible for 25% of catheter-related infections, is found in 50% of root-filled teeth with apical periodontitis, and can be isolated from other wounds. GrpE is found in the genome of Enterococcus faecilis and Enterococcus faecium and is critical for enterococcal biofilm attachment to polystyrene tubes, a plastic polymer commonly used in hospital settings.

Group A Streptococcus pyogenes is a bacterium that can lead to common infections, including strep throat and impetigo, but is also responsible for life-threatening infections. During infection, GrpE helps streptococcus bacteria adhere to pharyngeal epithelial cells. GrpE in Streptococcus binds to endogenous proline-rich proteins in saliva, allowing adhesion of the bacteria to the host.
