= DNAJC28 =

Protein-coding gene in the species Homo sapiens

Identifiers
- Aliases: DNAJC28, C21orf55, C21orf78, DnaJ heat shock protein family (Hsp40) member C28
- External IDs: MGI: 2181053; GeneCards: DNAJC28

Gene location (Human)
Chr.	Chromosome 21 (human)
Band	21q22.11	Start	33,485,530 bp
Band	21q22.11	End	33,491,716 bp

Gene location (Mouse)
Chr.	Chromosome 16 (mouse)
Band	16|16 C3.3	Start	91,411,142 bp
Band	16|16 C3.3	End	91,415,914 bp
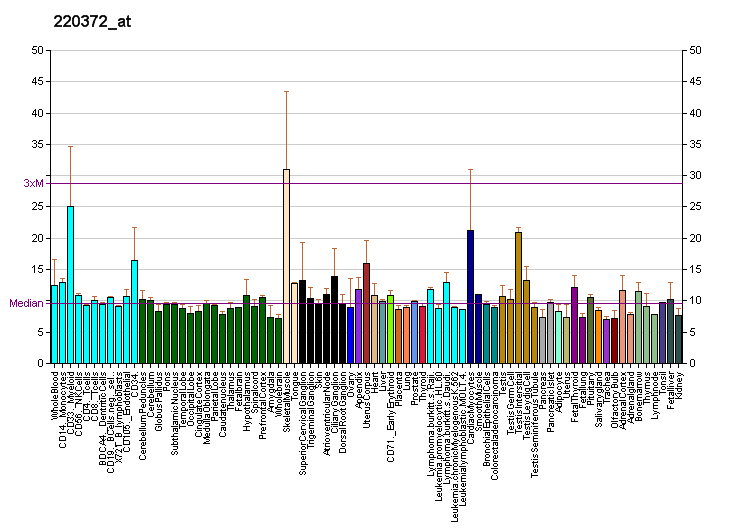
RNA expression pattern
Bgee	Human / Mouse (ortholog); Top expressed in: testicle; gonad; islet of Langerhans; apex of heart; muscle of thigh; prefrontal cortex; right adrenal cortex; left testis; gastrocnemius muscle; left ventricle / Top expressed in: spermatocyte; right ventricle; spermatid; extraocular muscle; digastric muscle; triceps brachii muscle; muscle of thigh; sternocleidomastoid muscle; myocardium of ventricle; temporal muscle; More reference expression data
BioGPS	More reference expression data
Gene ontology
Molecular function	protein binding
Cellular component	Golgi transport complex
Biological process	retrograde transport, vesicle recycling within Golgi; Golgi vesicle prefusion complex stabilization; retrograde vesicle-mediated transport, Golgi to endoplasmic reticulum; Golgi organization
Sources:Amigo / QuickGO
Orthologs
Databases	NCBI: entry; OMA: entry
Species	Human	Mouse
Entrez	54943	246738
Ensembl	ENSG00000262911; ENSG00000177692	ENSMUSG00000039763
UniProt	Q9NX36	Q8VCE1
RefSeq (mRNA)	NM_001040192; NM_017833; NM_001320746	NM_001099738; NM_138664
RefSeq (protein)	NP_001035282; NP_001307675; NP_060303	NP_001093208; NP_619605
Location (UCSC)	Chr 21: 33.49 – 33.49 Mb	Chr 16: 91.41 – 91.42 Mb
PubMed search
- Wikidata
View/Edit Human	View/Edit Mouse

DnaJ homolog subfamily C member 28 is a protein that in humans is encoded by the DNAJC28 gene. It's a member of chaperone DnaJ family. The family is also known as Hsp40 (heat shock protein 40 kDa).

== Gene ==
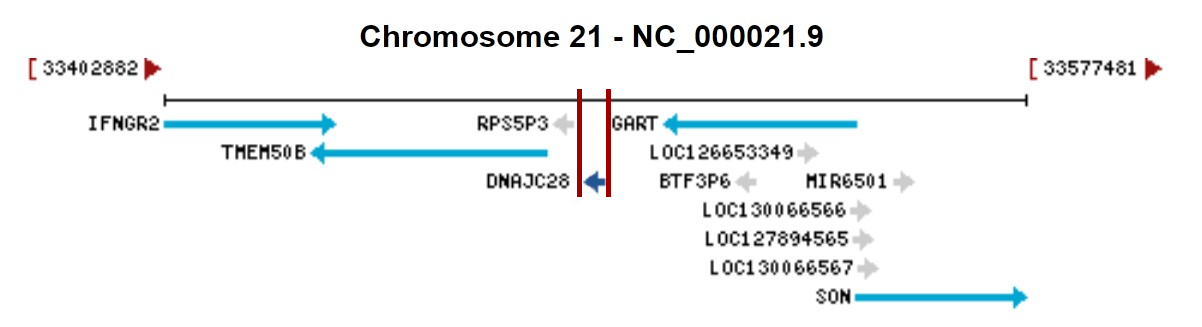
DNAJC28 human gene location with surrounding genes. IFNGR2 encodes the beta chain of the gamma interferon receptor, and defects in it cause extreme immunodeficiency. TMEM50B is hypothesized to be involved in endosome to vacuole transportation. Neighboring GART is involved in de novo purine synthesis. SON encodes a protein that binds RNA, promotes pre-mRNA splicing, and recognizes a human Hepatitis B virus DNA sequence, repressing its core promoter activity.

The DNAJC28 gene is located on the negative strand of Chromosome 21 (21q22.11), spanning 3,784 base pairs. Also known as C21orf78 or (previously) C21orf55 in humans, this gene has orthologs in animals, plants, and fungi. DNAJC28 has only 2 exons, the first of which is the only one that differs between transcript variants.

== RNA and transcriptional variants ==
DNAJC28 has a total of 3 transcriptional variants, all of which differ from transcript variant 1 in the 5' UTR and encode an identical protein. All transcripts contain the same 2 exons, with exon 2 completely containing the coding sequence.

DNAJC28 transcriptional variants, numerically labeled on the left. The 2 exons are also labeled. Light green regions are untranslated while the dark green regions are the coding sequence.

RNA and Protein Products of Each DNAJC28 Transcript Variant
DNAJC28 Transcript Variant Number	Accession number	mRNA length (nucleotides)	5'UTR length (nucleotides)	Protein Length (amino acids)
1	NM_017833.5	1706	367	388
2	NM_001040192.3	1485	146	388
3	NM_001320746.3	1462	123	388

== Orthologs ==
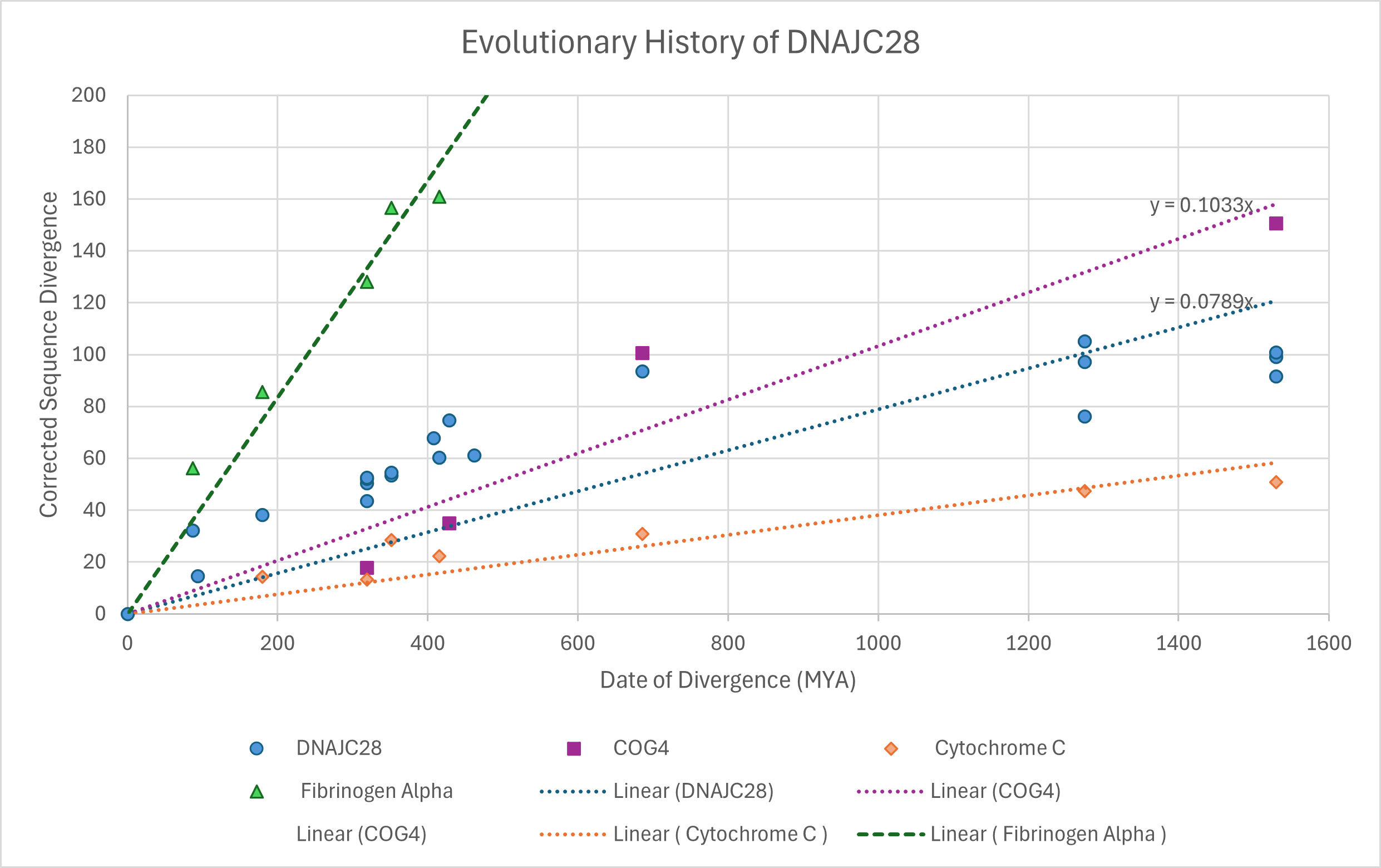
DNAJC28 Evolutionary History comparing median Date of Divergence from Homo sapiens (millions of years) and Corrected Sequence Divergence for DNAJC28, Cytochrome C, Fibrinogen Alpha, and COG4. Corrected sequence divergence was calculated using the percent identity between the protein sequences of the different species to humans.

There are three distinct subfamilies within the DnaJ family, of which subfamily A has the most taxonomically distant homolog of E. coli DnaJ, suggesting that it evolved earlier in history than the other subfamilies. DNAJC28 has its most distant orthologs in fungi. There are many DnaJ pseudogenes that are homologous only to part of the J-protein but tend to lack a majority of it.

DNAJC28 has one distant paralog, Component of Oligomeric Golgi Complex 4 (COG4). COG4's corresponding protein is a component of an oligomeric protein complex in the golgi apparatus that is involved in its structure and function, specifically retrograde transport.

The gene DNAJC28 is evolving relatively slowly since it is not evolving much faster than Cytochrome C and is significantly slower than Fibrinogen Alpha, as shown by the dark blue trendline.

Human DNAJC28 Orthologs
Organism Type	Species Name	Common Name	Taxonomic Group	Date of Divergence	% Identity	% Similarity	Accession Number	Protein Length (Amino Acids)
Mammal	Homo sapiens	Human	Primates	0	100.00%	100.00%	NP_060303.2	388
Mammal	Mus musculus	House mouse	Rodentia	87	72.49%	79.70%	NP_001093208.1	409
Mammal	Pteropus vampyrus	Large flying fox	Chiroptera	94	86.49%	93.30%	XP_011363977.1	384
Mammal	Ornithorhynchus anatinus	Platypus	Monotremata	180	68.32%	79.40%	XP_007667935.2	381
Reptile	Alligator mississippiensis	American alligator	Crocodilia	319	64.72%	75.10%	XP_059576706.1	378
Reptile	Sphaerodactylus townsendi	Townsend's least gecko	Squamata	319	60.50%	73.10%	XP_048348340.1	374
Bird	Falco peregrinus	Peregrin falcon	Falconiformes	319	59.47%	73.30%	XP_055657544.1	372
Bird	Gallus gallus	Chicken	Galliformes	319	59.09%	72.80%	XP_004934562.2	373
Amphibian	Bufo bufo	Common toad	Anura	352	58.70%	71.20%	XP_040279093.1	384
Amphibian	Rhinatrema bivittatum	Two-lined caecilians	Gymnophiona	352	58.01%	71.90%	XP_029459412.1	379
Fish	Protopterus annectens	West African lungfish	Dipnoi	408	50.82%	67.40%	XP_043928883.1	374
Fish	Latimeria chalumnae	West Indian Ocean coelacanth	Sarcopterygii	415	54.80%	74.50%	XP_006001534.1	379
Fish	Danio rerio	Zebrafish	Cyprinidae	429	47.40%	66.00%	NP_001017648.1	376
Fish	Callorhinchus milii	Australian ghostshark	Chondrichthyes	462	54.23%	64.30%	XP_007904164.1	376
Invertebrate	Drosophila melanogaster	Fruit fly	Insecta	686	39.27%	50.60%	AAY55603.1	355
Fungi	Rhizopus microsporus	Fungal plant pathogen	Mucoraceae	1275	46.67%	26.80%	CEG77023.1	518
Fungi	Dacryopinax primogenitus	Jelly fungi	Basidiomycota	1275	37.84%	33.80%	XP_040633566.1	481
Fungi	Rhizomucor pusillus	Human disease fungi	Lichtheimiaceae	1275	35.00%	34.50%	KAL1929861.1	329
Plant	Panicum virgatum	Switchgrass	Monocots	1530	40.00%	24.60%	XP_039855031.1	221
Plant	Populus trichocarpa	Black cottonwood	Eudicots	1530	37.14%	26.20%	XP_002322905.3	221
Plant	Sphagnum troendelagicum	Norwegian peat moss	Bryophyta	1530	36.50%	34.50%	CAK9220607.1	261

== Localization and expression ==
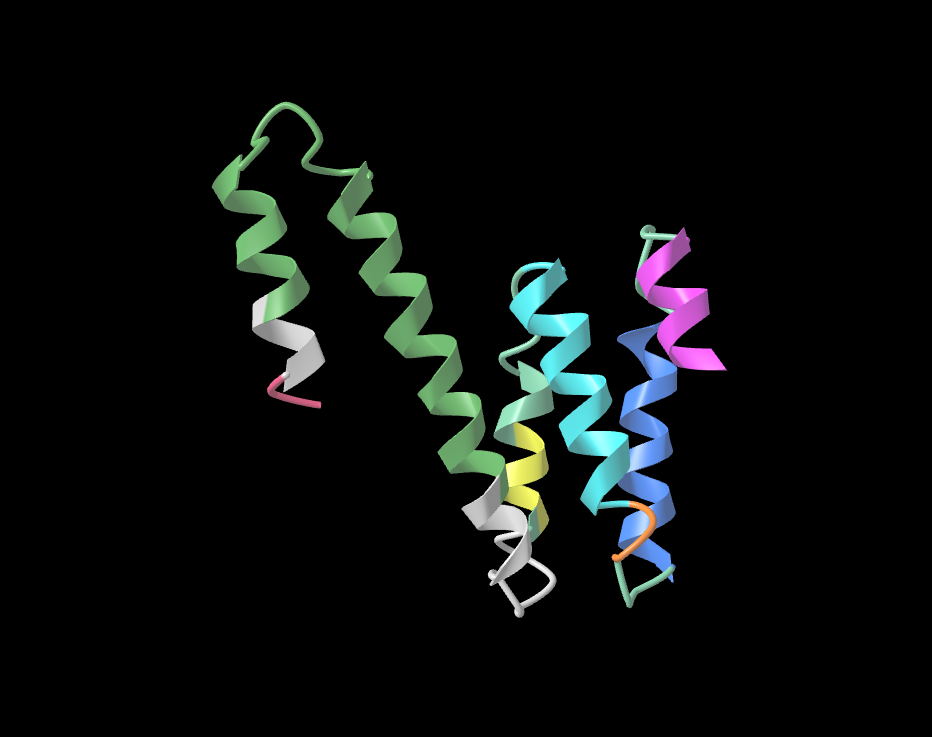
DNAJC28 iTasser Model 2. N-terminus is colored red. The predicted mitochondrial presequence is pictured in green (amino acids 7-39), light green is the NCBI listed DnaJ domain, yellow is Helix 1 (52-56), teal is Helix 2 (64-78), orange is the HPD motif, blue is Helix 3 (85-99), purple is Helix 4 (105-112).

A mitochondrial presequence was predicted from amino acids 7-39. Amino acids 7-16 are a highly positively charged amphiphilicity region. A mitochondrial targeting signal presequence traditionally has a high composition of arginine, a very low amount of negatively charged residues at the N-terminus, and forms an amphipathic helix with a positively charged side and a hydrophobic side opposite it. All of which are features of the DNAJC28 targeting presequence. The mitochondrial presequence cleavage site is predicted to be at amino acid 48.

There is low, ubiquitous expression of DNAJC28 in all human tissues. DNAJC28 is also expressed in almost all parts of the mouse brain, excluding the hypothalamus and pons.

== Structure ==
The protein DNAJC28 is 388 amino acids long and contains a conserved N-terminal J (DnaJ) domain, which is critical for interaction with Hsp70s. Molecular weight and isoelectric point of human DNAJC28 without post-translational modification are 45.8 kDa and 9.57 pI, respectively. DNAJC28 has no isoforms. No pattern was found across orthologs for amino acid composition.

=== Conserved regions ===
DNAJC28 contains a J domain, which is a defining feature of the DnaJ/Hsp40 family. J domains are highly conserved and are an integral part of protein translation, folding, translocation, and degradation through stimulating the ATPase activity of members of the Hsp70 family. Each J domain is around 70 base pairs long, composed of four alpha helices, and have a highly conserved His-Pro-Asp (HPD) tripeptide motif between the second and third helices.

There is a conserved domain of unknown function (DUF1992) from amino acids 203-272.

There is a coiled-coil region from approximately amino acids 288 to 318 that is conserved throughout all listed orthologs (through fungi and plants).

=== Tertiary structure ===
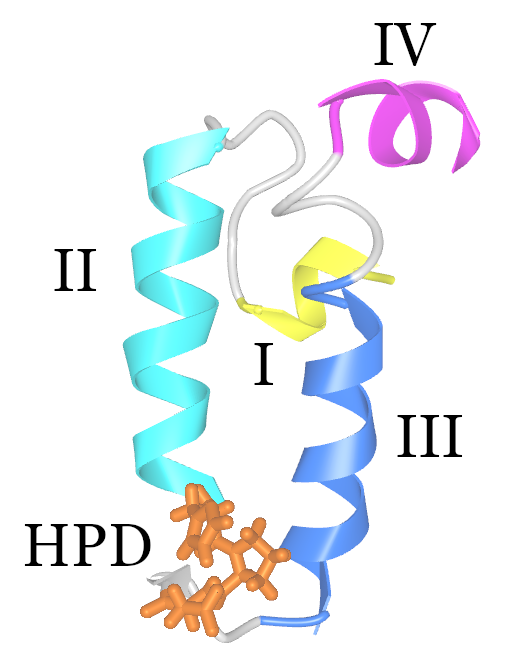
Predicted DNAJC28 J domain annotated with helices and HPD motif. Helix locations and shape were predicted using E. coli DnaJ protein. HPD motif is highlighted.

The E. coli DnaJ protein's J domain has been extensively analyzed and found to be of very similar tertiary structure to J domains of other members of the DnaJ family. DNAJC28's J domain tertiary structure was predicted and annotated based on the characteristics of other J domains.

=== Interacting proteins ===
DNAJC28 was found to mostly interact with proteins involved with the mitochondria and mitochondrial ATP synthase. Mitochondrial Hsp70 is also known to control F_{1}F_{0} ATP synthase assembly and control the quality of F_{1}F_{0} ATP synthase components. Other mitochondrial protein interactions were found on BioGrid.

DNAJC28 Protein Interactions
Hit	Full Name	Function	Location	Score
IARS2	isoleucyl-tRNA synthetase 2, mitochondrial	Catalyze aminoacylation of tRNA by linking cognate amino acid	Mitochondria, cytoplasm	935
LETM1	leucine zipper and EF-hand containing transmembrane protein 1	Maintains mitochondrial tubular shapes, required for cellular viability	Inner mitochondrial membrane	1535
SLC30A9	solute carrier family 30 member 9	Enables zinc ion transmembrane transporter activity, regulates mitochondria organization	Mitochondrial membrane, ER, cytoplasm	1570
TIMM44	translocase of inner mitochondrial membrane 44	Mediates binding of Hsp70 to translocase of inner mitochondrial membrane 23 complex	Mitochondrial membrane	2270

== Function ==
The DnaJ/Hsp40 family is one of the largest groups of molecular chaperones, characterized by their possession of a J domain (or DnaJ domain), which interacts with Hsp70. Hsp40s bind misfolded polypeptides or protein aggregates and deliver them to Hsp70 substrate-binding domains, greatly stimulating ATPase activity in the Hsp70 nucleotide-binding domain. Heat Shock Protein genes are generally activated when the cell is exposed to stress, such as high temperature, infection, and low oxygen. Subfamily C, which contains DNAJC28, is defined only by the presence of a J domain, not by the location of that J domain or specific-amino-acid rich sequences like the other two subfamilies. Members of subfamily C generally only interact with a limited number of substrates or do not bind directly to a substrate at all. Some Hsp40 proteins, instead of working with Hsp70, assist polypeptide movement through the mitochondrial translocon.

The HPD tripeptide motif of the J domain interacts with key regions of Hsp70 proteins, specifically the Hsp70 linker and nucleotide-binding domain (NBD) crevice, which then restricts the Hsp70 protein in an optimal position for ATP hydrolysis. The J domain also interacts with the Hsp70 substrate-binding domain β (SBDβ) to make signal transmission more efficient from the SBD to the NBD, greatly increasing affinity between the Hsp70 ADP-bound equilibrium state and substrates.

== Clinical significance ==
The Hsp70/Hsp40 chaperone system works in proteostasis processes, which involves breaking down protein aggregations like a-synuclein which accumulates in Parkinson's disease. A study found that damaging missense variants of DNAJC28 are likely related to sporadic late-onset Parkinson's disease.

DNAJC28 was found to be excessively expressed in the hippocampus of the lupus-prone mice model MRL/lpr during TWEAK (TNF-like weak inducer of apoptosis) activation, which is associated with the neuropsychiatric impacts of lupus. That overexpression could either be damaging or a protective response to lupus. Overexpression of other genes in the DnaJ family has been shown to contribute to neuroprotective effects in multiple neurodegenerative disease models. Hsp70 are also known to be a crucial, suppressive part of the intrinsic apoptosis pathway.

No DNAJC28 SNPs were found to have clinical significance.
