= Hsp70 =

Family of heat shock proteins

Hsp70 protein
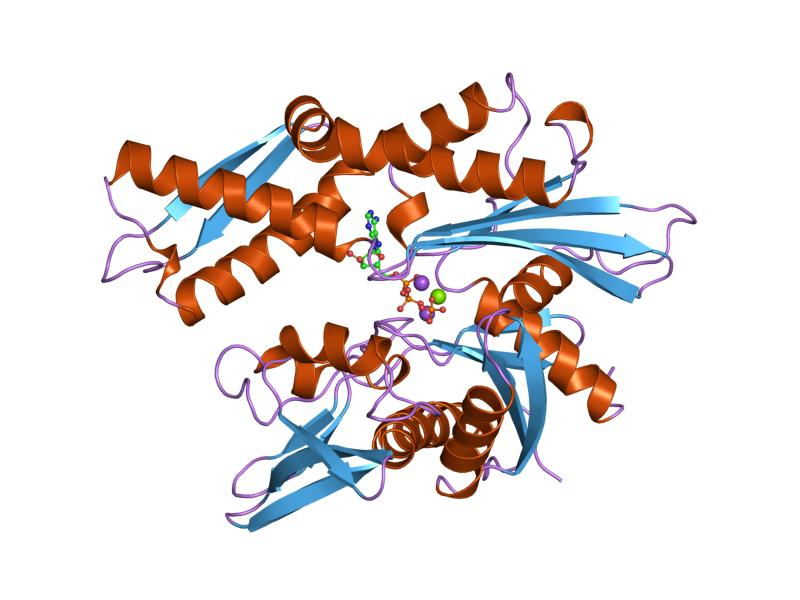
- Structure of the ATPase fragment of a 70K heat-shock cognate protein.

Identifiers
- Symbol: HSP70
- Pfam: PF00012
- Pfam clan: CL0108
- InterPro: IPR013126
- PROSITE: PDOC00269
- SCOP2: 3hsc / SCOPe / SUPFAM
Available protein structures:
- PDB: IPR013126 PF00012 (ECOD; PDBsum)
- AlphaFold: IPR013126; PF00012

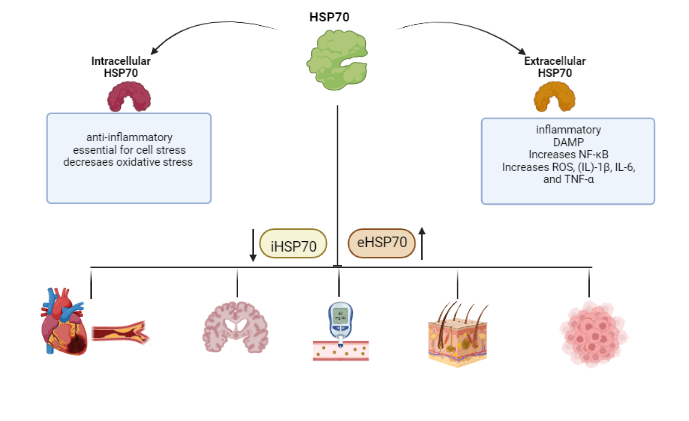
Schematic diagram highlighting the role of HSP70 in pathologies. The protective intracellular HSP70 is decreased whereas the levels of inflammatory extracellular HSP70 is increased. This imbalance leads to disease progression.

The 70 kilodalton heat shock proteins (Hsp70s or DnaK) are a family of conserved ubiquitously expressed heat shock proteins. Proteins with similar structure exist in virtually all living organisms and play crucial roles in the development of cancer, neurodegeneration, apoptosis, regulating sleep, and much more. Intracellularly localized Hsp70s are an important part of the cell's machinery for protein folding, performing chaperoning functions, and helping to protect cells from the adverse effects of physiological stresses. Additionally, membrane-bound Hsp70s have been identified as a potential target for cancer therapies and their extracellularly localized counterparts have been identified as having both membrane-bound and membrane-free structures. There is lot of potential in the Hsp70 protein as a key therapeutic target for developing new drugs for the treatment of sleep disorders, cancer, neurodegeneration, and other related pathological conditions.

== Discovery ==
Members of the Hsp70 family are very strongly upregulated by heat stress and toxic chemicals, particularly heavy metals such as arsenic, cadmium, copper, mercury, etc. Heat shock was originally discovered by Ferruccio Ritossa in the 1960s when a lab worker accidentally boosted the incubation temperature of Drosophila (fruit flies). When examining the chromosomes, Ritossa found a "puffing pattern" that indicated the elevated gene transcription of an unknown protein. This was later described as the "Heat Shock Response" and the proteins were termed the "Heat Shock Proteins" (Hsps).

== Structure ==
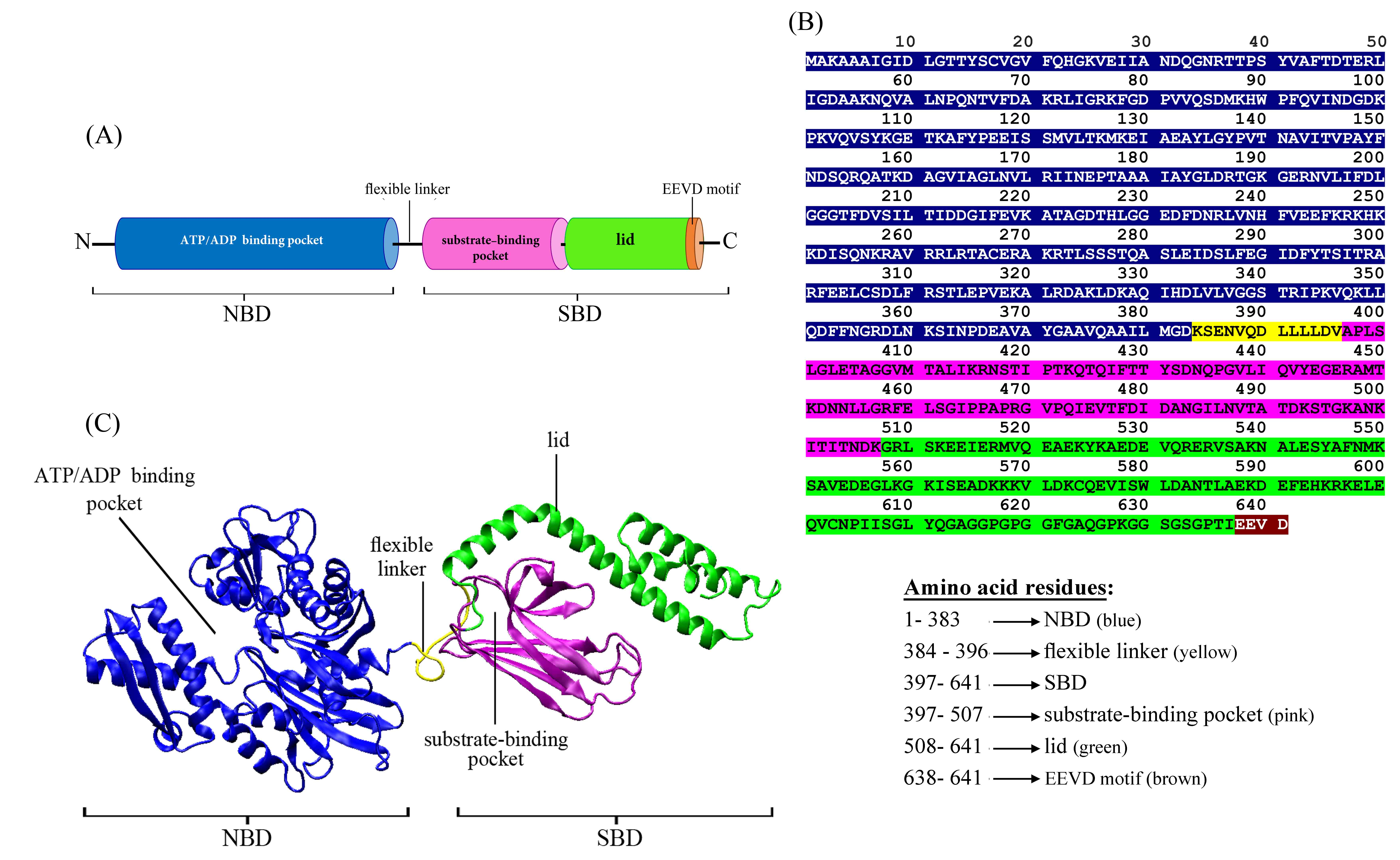
(a) The Hsp70s schematic domains. The Hsp70s consist of two high conserved functional domains including an NBD and a C‐terminal substrate‐binding domain (SBD), also an EEVD‐motif at C‐terminal. The NBD contains the ATP/ADP pocket that binds and The SBD contains a substrate‐binding pocket that interacts with extended polypeptides as substrate, an α‐helical subdomain from the C‐terminal side of SBD forms a flexible lid. EEVD‐motif participates in binding to co‐chaperones and other HSPs. (b) the complete amino acid sequence of human Hsp70 (UniProtKB identifier: P0DMV8) as a major stress‐inducible member of the Hsp70 family. (c) Secondary structures of Hsp70 virtualized using VMD 1.9.1 software. Hsp70, heat shock protein 70 kDa; NBD, N‐terminal nucleotide‐binding domain; SBD, substrate binding domain at C‐terminal.

The Hsp70 proteins have three major functional domains:

- N-terminal ATPase domain – binds ATP (Adenosine triphosphate) and hydrolyzes it to ADP (Adenosine diphosphate). The NBD (nucleotide binding domain) consists of two lobes with a deep cleft between them, at the bottom of which nucleotide (ATP and ADP) binds. The exchange of ATP and ADP leads to conformational changes in the other two domains.
- Substrate binding domain – is composed of a 15 kDa β sheet subdomain and a 10 kDa helical subdomain. The β sheet subdomain consists of stranded β sheets with upward protruding loops, which enclose the peptide backbone of the substrate. SBD contains a groove with an affinity for neutral, hydrophobic amino acid residues. The groove is long enough to interact with peptides up to seven residues in length.
- C-terminal domain – rich in alpha helical structure acts as a 'lid' for the substrate binding domain. The helical subdomain consists of five helices, with two helices packed against two sides of the β sheet subdomain, stabilizing the inner structure. In addition, one of the helix forms a salt bridge and several hydrogen bonds to the outer Loops, thereby closing the substrate-binding pocket like a lid. Three helices in this domain form another hydrophobic core which may be stabilization of the "lid". When an Hsp70 protein is ATP bound, the lid is open and peptides bind and release relatively rapidly. When Hsp70 proteins are ADP bound, the lid is closed, and peptides are tightly bound to the substrate binding domain.

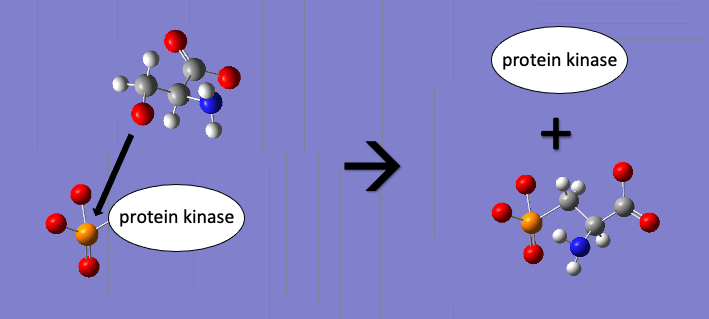
Phosphorylation of isolated serine residue by protein kinase.

Protein phosphorylation, a post-translational modification, helps to regulate protein function and involves the phosphorylation of amino acids with hydroxyl groups in their side chains (among eukaryotes). Serine, threonine, and tyrosine amino acids are common targets of phosphorylation. Phosphorylation of Hsp70 has become a point of greater exploration in scientific literature relatively recently. A 2020 publication suggests that phosphorylation of a serine residue between the NBD and substrate binding domain in yeast Hsp70s leads to a dramatic reduction of the normal Hsp70 heat shock response. This deactivation via phosphorylation of a protein is a common motif in protein regulation, and demonstrates how relatively small changes to protein structure can have biologically significant effects on protein function.

== Function ==
The Hsp70 system interacts with extended peptide segments of proteins as well as partially folded proteins to cause aggregation of proteins in key pathways to downregulate activity. When not interacting with a substrate peptide, Hsp70 is usually in an ATP bound state. Hsp70 by itself is characterized by a very weak ATPase activity, such that spontaneous hydrolysis will not occur for many minutes. As newly synthesized proteins emerge from the ribosomes, the substrate binding domain of Hsp70 recognizes sequences of hydrophobic amino acid residues, and interacts with them. This spontaneous interaction is reversible, and in the ATP bound state Hsp70 may relatively freely bind and release peptides. However, the presence of a peptide in the binding domain stimulates the ATPase activity of Hsp70, increasing its normally slow rate of ATP hydrolysis. When ATP is hydrolyzed to ADP the binding pocket of Hsp70 closes, tightly binding the now-trapped peptide chain. Further speeding ATP hydrolysis are the so-called J-domain cochaperones: primarily Hsp40 in eukaryotes, and DnaJ in prokaryotes. These cochaperones dramatically increase the ATPase activity of Hsp70 in the presence of interacting peptides.

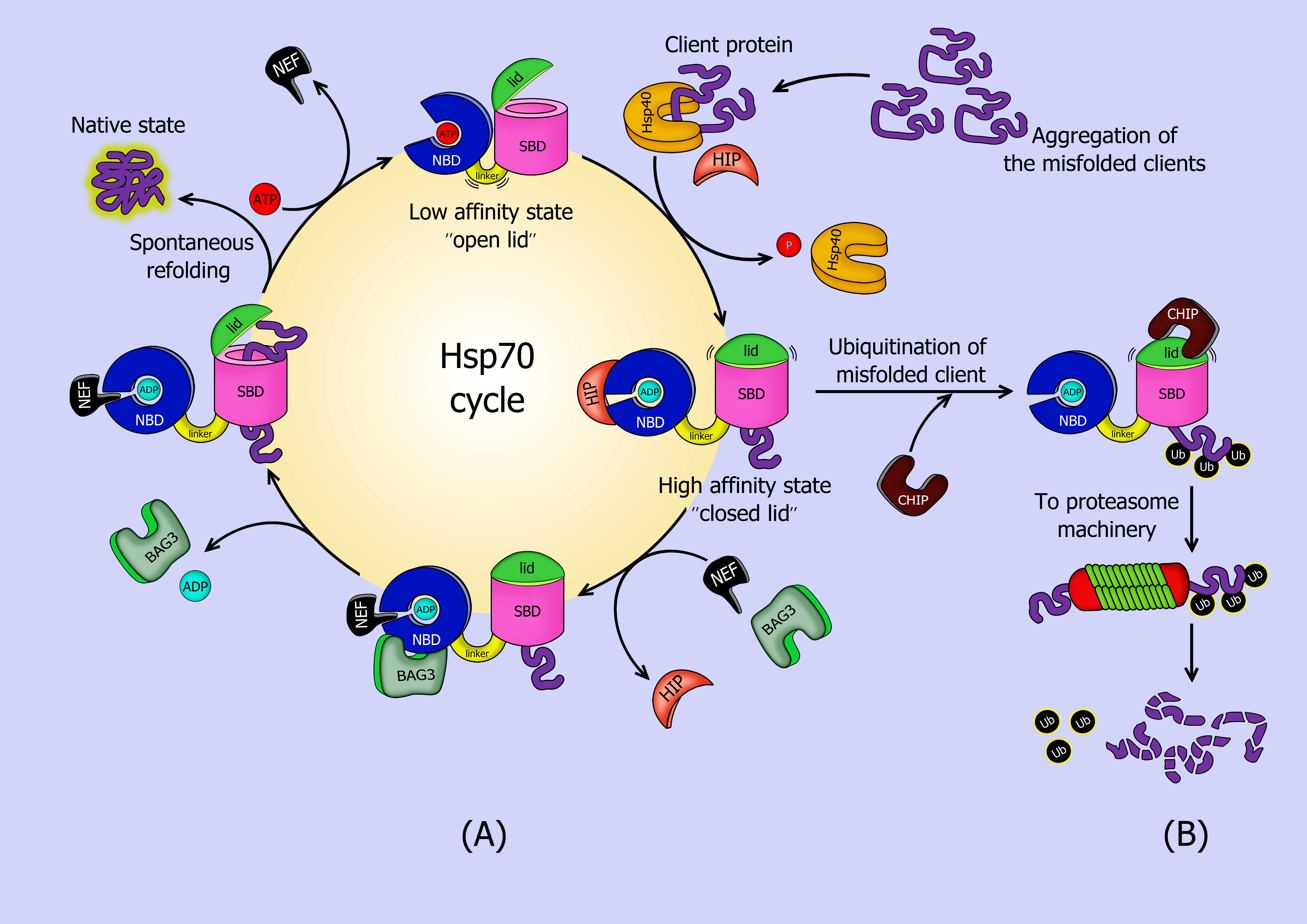
The function of Hsp70 in both (re) folding and degradation of misfolded client protein. (a) Schematic of the Hsp70 ATP–ADP cycle for (re) folding of client protein which causes a conformational change of the chaperone, ATP hydrolysis, and exchange. (b) Hsp70–CHIP complex that promotes client protein ubiquitination and proteasomal degradation. CHIP interacts with the TPR domain of Hsp70 and acts as a ubiquitin ligase for clients. CHIP, chromatin immunoprecipitation; Hsp70, heat shock protein 70 kDa; TPR, tetratricopeptide repeat domain

By binding tightly to partially synthesized peptide sequences (incomplete proteins), Hsp70 prevents them from aggregating and being rendered nonfunctional. Once the entire protein is synthesized, a nucleotide exchange factor (prokaryotic GrpE, eukaryotic BAG1 and HspBP1 are among those which have been identified) stimulates the release of ADP and binding of fresh ATP, opening the binding pocket. The protein is then free to fold on its own, or to be transferred to other chaperones for further processing. HOP (the Hsp70/Hsp90 Organizing Protein) can bind to both Hsp70 and Hsp90 at the same time, and mediates the transfer of peptides from Hsp70 to Hsp90.

Hsp70 also aids in transmembrane transport of proteins, by stabilizing them in a partially folded state. It is also known to be phosphorylated which regulates several of its functions.

Hsp70 proteins can act to protect cells from thermal or oxidative stress. These stresses normally act to damage proteins, causing partial unfolding and possible aggregation. By temporarily binding to hydrophobic residues exposed by stress, Hsp70 prevents these partially denatured proteins from aggregating, and inhibits them from refolding. Low ATP is characteristic of heat shock and sustained binding is seen as aggregation suppression, while recovery from heat shock involves substrate binding and nucleotide cycling. In a thermophile anaerobe (Thermotoga maritima) the Hsp70 demonstrates redox sensitive binding to model peptides, suggesting a second mode of binding regulation based on oxidative stress.

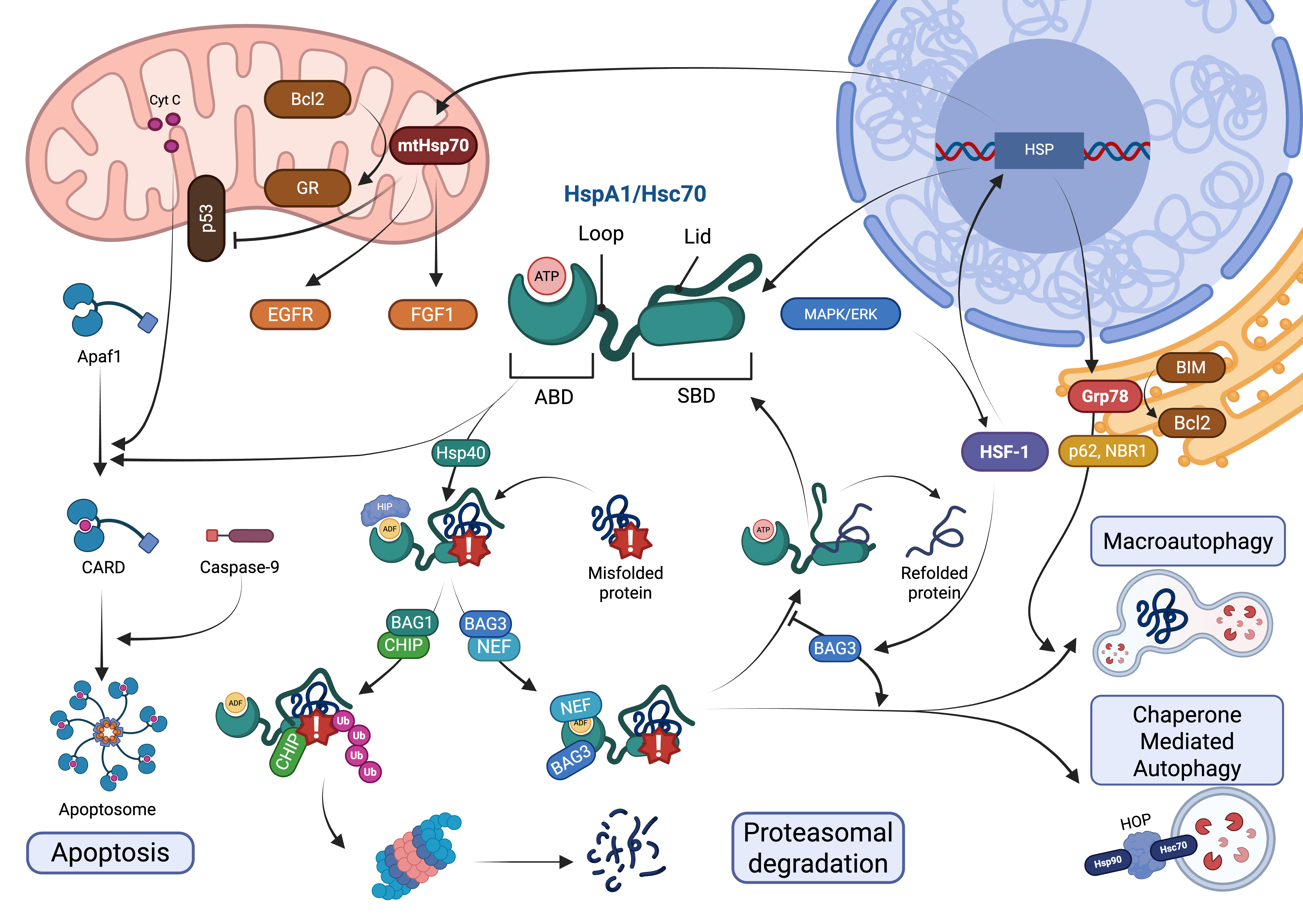
Cytosolic HspA1/Hsc70 feature core domains: N-terminal ATPase (ABD), allosteric linker, substrate-binding domain (SBDβ), and an ATP/ADP-regulated lid. Hsp40 delivers misfolded protein; HIP promotes ADP-state/lid closure for refolding. Failure triggers apoptosis, blocked by Hsp70 inhibiting APAF1/caspase-9. BAG1/CHIP directs ubiquitin-proteasome degradation; BAG3 inhibits NEF, retaining substrate in SBDβ (HSF1 active). BAG3 decrease releases NEF, enabling substrate refolding. Autophagy occurs via ER-Grp78/p62/NBR1 (macroautophagy) or cytosolic Hsc70/HOP/Hsp90 (chaperone-mediated, lysosomal). Anti-apoptosis: Grp78 blocks BIM/Bcl2; mtHsp70 induces Bcl-2, aiding GR import and positively modulating EGFR/FGF-1 while suppressing p53.

Hsp70 seems to be able to participate in disposal of damaged or defective proteins. Interaction with CHIP (Carboxyl-terminus of Hsp70 Interacting Protein)–an E3 ubiquitin ligase–allows Hsp70 to pass proteins to the cell's ubiquitination and proteolysis pathways.

Finally, in addition to improving overall protein integrity, Hsp70 directly inhibits apoptosis. One hallmark of apoptosis is the release of cytochrome c, which then recruits Apaf-1 and dATP/ATP into an apoptosome complex. This complex then cleaves procaspase-9, activating caspase-9 and eventually inducing apoptosis via caspase 3 activation. Hsp70 inhibits this process by blocking the recruitment of procaspase-9 to the Apaf-1/dATP/cytochrome c apoptosome complex. It does not bind directly to the procaspase-9 binding site, but likely induces a conformational change that renders procaspase-9 binding less favorable. Hsp70 is shown to interact with Endoplasmic reticulum stress sensor protein IRE1alpha thereby protecting the cells from ER stress - induced apoptosis. This interaction prolonged the splicing of XBP-1 mRNA thereby inducing transcriptional upregulation of targets of spliced XBP-1 like EDEM1, ERdj4 and P58IPK rescuing the cells from apoptosis. Other studies suggest that Hsp70 may play an anti-apoptotic role at other steps, but is not involved in Fas-ligand-mediated apoptosis (although Hsp 27 is). Therefore, Hsp70 not only saves important components of the cell (the proteins) but also directly saves the cell as a whole. Considering that stress-response proteins (like Hsp70) evolved before apoptotic machinery, Hsp70's direct role in inhibiting apoptosis provides an interesting evolutionary picture of how more recent (apoptotic) machinery accommodated previous machinery (Hsps), thus aligning the improved integrity of a cell's proteins with the improved chances of that particular cell's survival.

In mice, exogenous recombinant human Hsp70 (eHsp70), delivered intranasally, increases lifespan. Although the maximum lifespan increased only moderately, the overall mortality rate in treated animals was much lower compared with the control group. Also this eHsp70-treatment improves learning and memory of mice in old age, increases their curiosity.

== Cancer ==
Hsp70 is overexpressed in melanoma and underexpressed in renal cell cancer. In breast cancer cell line (MCF7) has been found that not only Hsp90 interacted with estrogen receptor alpha (ERα) but also Hsp70-1 and Hsc70 interacted with ERα too.

Given the role of heat shock proteins as an ancient defense system for stabilizing cells and eliminating old and damaged cells, this system has been co-opted by cancer cells to promote their growth. Increased Hsp70 in particular has been shown to inhibit apoptosis of cancer cells, and increased Hsp70 has been shown to be associated with or directly induce endometrial, lung, colon, prostate, and breast cancer, as well as leukemia. Hsp70 in cancer cells may be responsible for tumorigenesis and tumor progression by providing resistance to chemotherapy. Inhibition of Hsp70 has been shown to reduce the size of tumors and can cause their complete regression. Hsp70/Hsp90 is a particularly attractive target for therapeutics, because it is regulated by the inhibition of its ATPase activity, while other HSPs are regulated by nucleotides. Several inhibitors have been designed for Hsp70 that are currently in clinical trials, though as of now HSP90 inhibitors have been more successful. In addition, Hsp70 has been shown to be a regulator of the immune system, activating the immune system as an antigen. Thus, tumor-derived Hsp70 has been suggested as a potential vaccine or avenue to target for immunotherapy. Given the increased expression of Hsp70 in cancer, it has been suggested as a biomarker for cancer prognostics, with high levels portending poor prognosis. An oncogenic mechanism illustrates how extracellular vesicles expressing HSP70 are produced by proliferative Acute Lymphoblastic Leukemia cells and can target and compromise a healthy hematopoiesis system during leukemia development.

== Expression in skin tissue ==
Both Hsp70 and HSP47 were shown to be expressed in dermis and epidermis following laser irradiation, and the spatial and temporal changes in HSP expression patterns define the laser-induced thermal damage zone and the process of healing in tissues. Hsp70 may define biochemically the thermal damage zone in which cells are targeted for destruction, and HSP47 may illustrate the process of recovery from thermally induced damage. HSP70 helps in protecting skin against the increased melanin and wrinkled formation induced due to UV exposure.

== Neurodegeneration ==
Inhibition of Hsp90 leads to Hsp70 and Hsp40 upregulation, which can channel misfolded protein for proteasome degradation, which can potentially inhibit the progression of neurodegenerative diseases. For example, Hsp70 overexpression in human neuroglioma cells transfected with mutant alpha-synuclein led to 50% less oligomeric alpha-synuclein species, pointing towards the possibility that increasing its expression could diminish the spread of Parkinson's disease. Similarly, Hsp70 overexpression suppressed poly-Q dependent aggregation and neurodegeneration in cell cultures, yeast, fly, and mouse models, and deletion of hsp70 increased the size of polyQ inclusion bodies, suggesting that increasing its expression could help to prevent Huntington's disease. Similarly, reductions in Hsp70 have been shown in transgenic mouse models of ALS and patients with sporadic ALS. Lastly, increased expression or activity of Hsp70 has been proposed as a method to prevent the progression of Alzheimer's disease, because knock down of Hsp70 promoted A-beta toxicity, and Hsp70 was shown to promote tau stability, while Hsp70 levels are decreased in tauopathies like Alzheimer's disease. Given the complex interplay between the different chaperone proteins, therapeutic development in this field is aimed at investigating how the chaperone network as a whole can be manipulated and the effect of this manipulation on the progression of neurodegenerative disease, but the balance of Hsp70 and Hsp90 levels appears to be central in this pathophysiology.

== In diabetes ==
The fluctuations in the levels of chaperone HSP70 affect the homeostasis. Diabetes leads to several microvasculature and microvasculature diseases like retinopathy, Toll like receptors are integral part of innate immune system and eHSP70 binds to toll like receptors and activates the MyD88 pathway, further stimulating NF-kB, cytokines like TNFα and IL1 β, increased production of reactive oxygen species contributing to insulin resistance and diabetes. Whereas there is decrease in the levels of iHSP70.

== In cardiovascular diseases ==
HSP70 is a chaperone with ubiquitous presence. It is crucial in the cardiovascular system. HSP70 normally aids in protein folding and aggregation; when present in the cell, functioning as an anti-inflammatory molecule; however, under stress conditions, it occurs in the extracellular milieu, where it is involved in inducing inflammatory pathways and contributes to disease pathogenesis. It is well established that intracellular HSP70 (iHSP70) levels play a protective role, whereas extracellular HSP70 (eHSP70) levels in circulating blood are linked to pathophysiology in vasculature, which results in a variety of cardiovascular illnesses. HSP70 homologues identified in human cytosol includes HSPA1A, HSPA1B, HSPA1L, HSPA12B, HSPA13, HSPA14 whereas HSPA9 in mitochondria. HSP70 acts as a damage-associated molecular pattern (DAMP) and activates innate immune response, which is involved in cardiovascular disease progression.

The chaperone protein acts as auto antigen in atherosclerosis. Increased oxidative stress causes the formation of high-density oxidized LDL, the first event in the formation of plaque. This activates HSP70 and its promoter in the endothelial and smooth muscle cells, which contributes to atherosclerosis by inducing JAK/STAT pathway expression.

HSP70 is linked to high blood pressure. HSPA1A, HSPA1B, and HSPA1L are three genes in humans that encode HSP70, and their polymorphism is linked to the onset of high blood pressure and cardiovascular disease. Angiotensin II, endothelin-1, or phenylepinephrine cause HSP70 overexpression, which activates several molecular pathways, resulting in increased production of ROS, CRP, IL-10, TNF-alpha, and IL-6 These inflammatory signals interfere with the antioxidant machinery and results in rapid disease progression.

HSP70 expression increases after the coronary bypass surgery. Exercise has a positive and protective impact on cardiovascular disorders and stimulates the increased production of chaperone protein, which is cardioprotective.

== Family members ==
Prokaryotes express three Hsp70 proteins: DnaK, HscA (Hsc66), and HscC (Hsc62).

Eukaryotic organisms express several slightly different Hsp70 proteins. All share the common domain structure, but each has a unique pattern of expression or subcellular localization. These are, among others:

- Hsc70 (Hsp73/HSPA8) is a constitutively expressed chaperone protein. It typically makes up one to three percent of total cellular protein.
- Hsp70 (encoded by three very closely related paralogs: HSPA1A, HSPA1B, and HSPA1L) is a stress-induced protein. High levels can be produced by cells in response to hyperthermia, oxidative stress, and changes in pH.
- Binding immunoglobulin protein (BiP or Grp78) is a protein localized to the endoplasmic reticulum. It is involved in protein folding there, and can be upregulated in response to stress or starvation.
- mtHsp70 or Grp75 is the mitochondrial Hsp70.

The following is a list of human Hsp70 genes and their corresponding proteins:

gene	protein	synonyms	subcellular location
HSPA1A	Hsp70	HSP70-1, Hsp72	Nuc/Cyto
HSPA1B	Hsp70	HSP70-2	Nuc/Cyto
HSPA1L	Hsp70		?
HSPA2	Hsp70-2		?
HSPA5	Hsp70-5	BiP/Grp78	ER
HSPA6	Hsp70-6		?
HSPA7	Hsp70-7		?
HSPA8	Hsp70-8	Hsc70	Nuc/Cyto
HSPA9	Hsp70-9	Grp75/mtHsp70	Mito
HSPA12A	Hsp70-12a		?
HSPA14	Hsp70-14		?

HSP70s are found in many plants including Arabidopsis, soybean (Glycine max), barley (Hordeum vulgare) and wheat (Triticum aestivum).

=== Hsps 90 and 110 ===
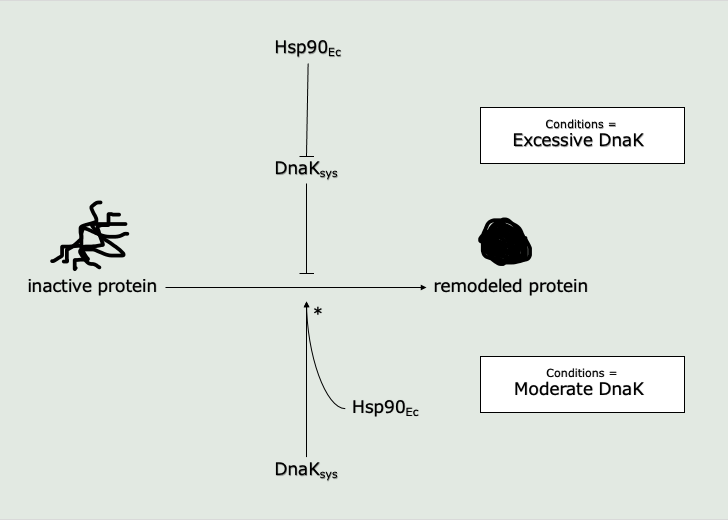

Hsp90s are essential for protein remodeling, similar to Hsp70 proteins, and play an especially vital role in eukaryotes, where it has been suggested that Hsp90 interacts with the DnaK system (composed of DnaK, GrpE, and either DnaJ or CbpA) to facilitate the process of protein remodeling. In E. coli, Hsp90s works collaboratively with Hsp70s to facilitate protein remodeling and activation. Hsp90Ec and DnaK are chaperones of Hsp90 and Hsp70, respectively. DnaK initially binds and stabilizes the misfolded protein before working collaboratively with Hsp90Ec to refold this substrate and cause its activation. Given conditions of excess DnaK, this chaperone has been found to inhibit remodeling of proteins. However, the presence of Hsp90Ec can mitigate this effect and enable protein remodeling despite conditions of excess DnaK.

The Hsp70 superfamily also includes a family of Hsp110/Grp170 (Sse) proteins, which are larger proteins related to Hsp70. The Hsp110 family of proteins have divergent functions: yeast Sse1p has little ATPase activity but is a chaperone on its own as well as a nucleotide exchange factor for Hsp70, while the closely related Sse2p has little unfoldase activity.

The following is a list of currently named human HSP110 genes. HSPH2-4 are proposed names and the current name is linked:

gene	synonyms	subcellular location
HSPH1	HSP105	Cyto
HSPH2	HSPA4; APG-2; HSP110	Cyto
HSPH3	HSPA4L; APG-1	Nuc
HSPH4	HYOU1/Grp170; ORP150; HSP12A	ER

== See also ==
- Heat shock protein 70 internal ribosome entry site
