= DNAJA3 =

Protein-coding gene in the species Homo sapiens

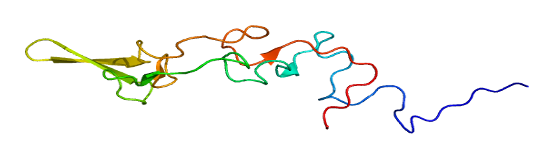

Identifiers
- Aliases: DNAJA3, HCA57, TID1, hTID-1, DnaJ heat shock protein family (Hsp40) member A3
- External IDs: OMIM: 608382; MGI: 1933786; GeneCards: DNAJA3
Available structures
PDB	Ortholog search: PDBe RCSB
PDB	List of PDB id codes 2CTT, 2DN9

Gene location (Human)
Chr.	Chromosome 16 (human)
Band	16p13.3	Start	4,425,805 bp
Band	16p13.3	End	4,456,775 bp

Gene location (Mouse)
Chr.	Chromosome 16 (mouse)
Band	16 A1|16 2.46 cM	Start	4,457,853 bp
Band	16 A1|16 2.46 cM	End	4,525,559 bp
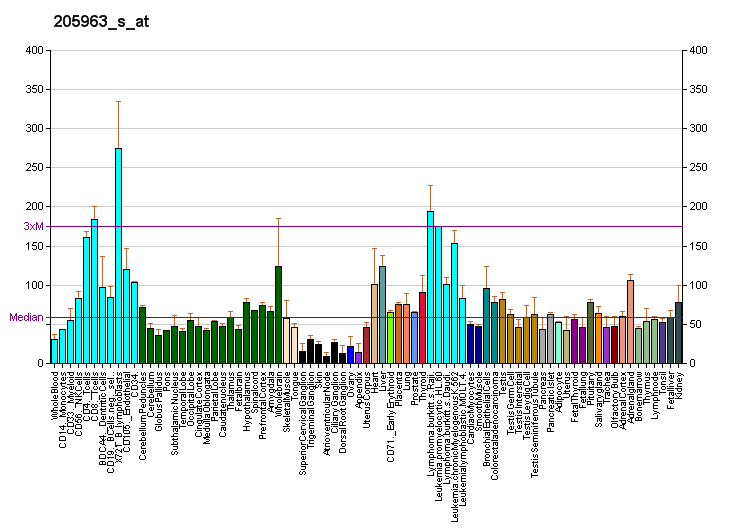
RNA expression pattern
Bgee	Human / Mouse (ortholog); Top expressed in: gastrocnemius muscle; skeletal muscle tissue; muscle of thigh; right adrenal gland; right adrenal cortex; right lobe of liver; left adrenal gland; left ventricle; left adrenal cortex; apex of heart / Top expressed in: interventricular septum; Ileal epithelium; extensor digitorum longus muscle; brown adipose tissue; right kidney; plantaris muscle; soleus muscle; digastric muscle; myocardium of ventricle; sternocleidomastoid muscle; More reference expression data
BioGPS	More reference expression data
Gene ontology
Molecular function	interferon-gamma receptor binding; heat shock protein binding; GTPase regulator activity; unfolded protein binding; transcription factor binding; metal ion binding; NF-kappaB binding; protein binding; ATP binding; protein kinase binding; Hsp70 protein binding
Cellular component	cytoplasm; cytosol; postsynaptic membrane; I-kappaB/NF-kappaB complex; intracellular membrane-bounded organelle; membrane; neuromuscular junction; plasma membrane; synapse; cell junction; mitochondrial matrix; mitochondrion; actin filament; extrinsic component of plasma membrane; mitochondrial nucleoid; IkappaB kinase complex; nucleus
Biological process	negative regulation of cysteine-type endopeptidase activity involved in apoptotic process; negative regulation of interferon-gamma-mediated signaling pathway; T cell differentiation in thymus; response to interferon-gamma; negative regulation of protein kinase activity; small GTPase mediated signal transduction; protein stabilization; mitochondrion organization; negative regulation of apoptotic process; activation-induced cell death of T cells; response to heat; negative regulation of transcription by RNA polymerase II; mitochondrial DNA replication; negative regulation of I-kappaB kinase/NF-kappaB signaling; protein folding; neuromuscular junction development; positive regulation of T cell proliferation; positive regulation of apoptotic process; negative regulation of programmed cell death; regulation of catalytic activity; negative regulation of NF-kappaB transcription factor activity; activation of cysteine-type endopeptidase activity involved in apoptotic process; positive regulation of protein ubiquitination; negative regulation of cell population proliferation; apoptotic process; skeletal muscle acetylcholine-gated channel clustering
Sources:Amigo / QuickGO
Orthologs
Databases	NCBI: entry; OMA: entry
Species	Human	Mouse
Entrez	9093	83945
Ensembl	ENSG00000276726; ENSG00000103423	ENSMUSG00000004069
UniProt	Q96EY1; Q53G26	Q99M87
RefSeq (mRNA)	NM_005147; NM_001135110; NM_001286516	NM_001135112; NM_023646
RefSeq (protein)	NP_001128582; NP_001273445; NP_005138; NP_005138.3	NP_001128584; NP_076135
Location (UCSC)	Chr 16: 4.43 – 4.46 Mb	Chr 16: 4.46 – 4.53 Mb
PubMed search
- Wikidata
View/Edit Human	View/Edit Mouse

DnaJ homolog subfamily A member 3, mitochondrial, also known as Tumorous imaginal disc 1 (TID1), is a protein that in humans is encoded by the DNAJA3 gene on chromosome 16. This protein belongs to the DNAJ/Hsp40 protein family, which is known for binding and activating Hsp70 chaperone proteins to perform protein folding, degradation, and complex assembly. As a mitochondrial protein, it is involved in maintaining membrane potential and mitochondrial DNA (mtDNA) integrity, as well as cellular processes such as cell movement, growth, and death. Furthermore, it is associated with a broad range of diseases, including neurodegenerative diseases, inflammatory diseases, and cancers.

== Structure ==
As a member of the DNAJ/Hsp40 protein family, DNAJA3 contains a conserved DnaJ domain, which includes an HPD motif that interacts with Hsp70 to perform its cochaperone function. The DnaJ domain is composed of tetrahelical regions containing a tripeptide of histidine, proline and aspartic acid situated between two helices. In addition, this protein contains a glycine/phenylalanine (G/F) rich linker region and a central cysteine-rich region similar to a zinc finger repeat, both characteristic of type I DnaJ molecular chaperones. The mitochondrial targeting sequence at its N-terminal directs the localization of the protein to the mitochondrial matrix.

DNAJA3 possesses two alternatively spliced forms: a long isoform of 43 kDa and a short isoform of 40 kDa. The long isoform contains an additional 33 residues at its C-terminal compared to the short isoform, and this region is predicted to hinder the long isoform from regulating membrane potential.

== Function ==
DNAJA3 is a member of the DNAJ/Hsp40 protein family, which stimulates the ATPase activity of Hsp70 chaperones and plays critical roles in protein folding, degradation, and multiprotein complex assembly. DNAJA3 localizes to the mitochondria, where it interacts with the mitochondrial Hsp70 chaperone (mtHsp70) to carry out the chaperone system. This protein is crucial for maintaining a homogeneous distribution of mitochondrial membrane potential and the integrity of mtDNA. DNAJA3 homogenizes membrane potential through regulation of complex I aggregation, though the mechanism for maintaining mtDNA remains unknown. These functions then allow DNAJA3 to mediate mitochondrial fission through DRP1 and, by extension, cellular processes such as cell movement, growth, proliferation, differentiation, senescence, and apoptosis. However, though both isoforms of DNAJA3 are involved with cell survival, they are also observed to influence two opposing outcomes. The proapoptotic long isoform induces apoptosis by stimulating cytochrome C release and caspase activation in the mitochondria, whereas the antiapoptotic short isoform prevents cytochrome C release and, thus, apoptosis. In neuromuscular junctions, only the short isoform clusters acetylcholine receptors for efficient synaptic transmission. The two isoforms also differ in their specific mitochondrial localization, which may partially account for their different functions.

Before localization to the mitochondria, DNAJA3 is transiently retained in the cytosol, where it can also interact with cytosolic proteins and possibly function to transport these proteins.

== Clinical significance ==
This protein is implicated in several cancers, including skin cancer, breast cancer, and colorectal cancer. It is a key player in tumor suppression through interactions with oncogenic proteins, including ErbB2 and the p53 tumor suppressor protein. Under hypoxic conditions, DNAJA3 may directly influence p53 complex assembly or modification, or indirectly ubiquitinylate p53 through ubiquitin ligases like MDM2. Moreover, both p53 and DNAJA3 must be present in the mitochondria in order to induce apoptosis in the cell. In head and neck squamous cell carcinoma (HNSCC) cancer, DNAJA3 suppresses cell proliferation, anchorage-independent growth, cell motility, and cell invasion by attenuating EGFR and, downstream the signaling pathway, AKT. Thus, treatments promoting DNAJA3 expression and function may greatly aid the elimination of tumors.

Additionally, DNAJA3 is implicated in neurodegenerative diseases like Parkinson's disease by virtue of its key roles in chaperoning mitochondrial proteins and mediating mitochondrial morphology in conjunction with mtHsp70. Another disease, psoriasis, is a chronic inflammatory skin disease that results from the absence of DNAJA3 activity, which then results in the activation of MK5, increased phosphorylation of HSP27, increased actin cytoskeleton organization, and hyperthickened skin.

== Interactions ==
DNAJA3 has been shown to interact with:

- ErbB-2 receptor tyrosine kinase
- MK5
- HSPA9
- HSPA8,
- JAK2, and
- RASA1
