= HSPA7 =

Protein-coding gene in humans

heat shock 70kDa protein 7 (HSP70B)

Identifiers
- Symbol: HSPA7
- NCBI gene: 3311
- HGNC: 5240
- OMIM: 140556
- UniProt: P48741

Other data
- Locus: Chr. 1 q23.3
Search for
- Structures: Swiss-model
- Domains: InterPro

Heat shock 70kDa protein 7 (HSP70B) also known as HSPA7 is a human gene. The protein encoded by this gene is a member of the Hsp70 family of heat shock proteins.
