= HSPA12A =

Protein-coding gene found in humans

Identifiers
- Aliases: HSPA12A, heat shock protein family A (Hsp70) member 12A
- External IDs: OMIM: 610701; MGI: 1920692; GeneCards: HSPA12A

Gene location (Human)
Chr.	Chromosome 10 (human)
Band	10q25.3	Start	116,671,192 bp
Band	10q25.3	End	116,850,251 bp

Gene location (Mouse)
Chr.	Chromosome 19 (mouse)
Band	19|19 D2	Start	58,784,182 bp
Band	19|19 D2	End	58,932,086 bp
RNA expression pattern
Bgee	Human / Mouse (ortholog); Top expressed in: lateral nuclear group of thalamus; spinal ganglia; trigeminal ganglion; tibial nerve; sural nerve; pons; Brodmann area 46; middle temporal gyrus; postcentral gyrus; pars compacta / Top expressed in: lateral geniculate nucleus; neural layer of retina; dentate gyrus of hippocampal formation granule cell; spinal ganglia; medial geniculate nucleus; subiculum; medial dorsal nucleus; lumbar spinal ganglion; primary visual cortex; sciatic nerve; More reference expression data
BioGPS	n/a
Gene ontology
Molecular function	ATP binding; nucleotide binding; molecular function
Cellular component	extracellular exosome
Biological process	biological process
Sources:Amigo / QuickGO
Orthologs
Databases	NCBI: entry; OMA: entry
Species	Human	Mouse
Entrez	259217	73442
Ensembl	ENSG00000165868	ENSMUSG00000025092
UniProt	O43301	Q8K0U4
RefSeq (mRNA)	NM_025015; NM_001330164	NM_175199; NM_001327998
RefSeq (protein)	NP_001317093; NP_079291	NP_001314927; NP_780408
Location (UCSC)	Chr 10: 116.67 – 116.85 Mb	Chr 19: 58.78 – 58.93 Mb
PubMed search
- Wikidata
View/Edit Human	View/Edit Mouse

Heat shock 70kDa protein 12A also known as HSPA12A is a human gene. The protein encoded by this gene is a member of the Hsp70 family of heat shock proteins.
