= HYOU1 =

Protein-coding gene in the species Homo sapiens

Identifiers
- Aliases: HYOU1, GRP-170, Grp170, HSP12A, ORP-150, ORP150, hypoxia up-regulated 1, IMD59
- External IDs: OMIM: 601746; MGI: 108030; GeneCards: HYOU1

Gene location (Human)
Chr.	Chromosome 11 (human)
Band	11q23.3	Start	119,044,188 bp
Band	11q23.3	End	119,057,227 bp

Gene location (Mouse)
Chr.	Chromosome 9 (mouse)
Band	9|9 A5.2	Start	44,290,787 bp
Band	9|9 A5.2	End	44,303,666 bp
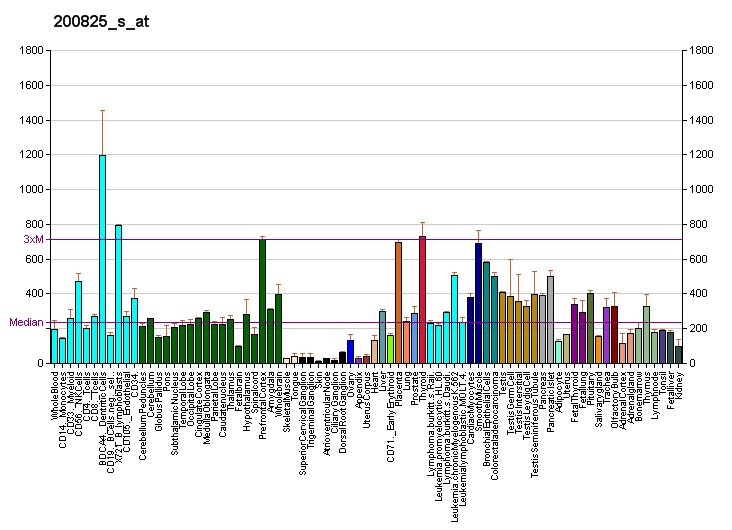
RNA expression pattern
Bgee	Human / Mouse (ortholog); Top expressed in: islet of Langerhans; body of pancreas; anterior pituitary; right testis; left testis; right lobe of thyroid gland; stromal cell of endometrium; left lobe of thyroid gland; appendix; right lobe of liver / Top expressed in: spermatocyte; otic placode; saccule; spermatid; supraoptic nucleus; otic vesicle; gastrula; pyloric antrum; tail of embryo; ciliary body; More reference expression data
BioGPS	More reference expression data
Gene ontology
Molecular function	nucleotide binding; chaperone binding; ATP binding; protein binding
Cellular component	endocytic vesicle lumen; endoplasmic reticulum lumen; membrane; focal adhesion; smooth endoplasmic reticulum; endoplasmic reticulum chaperone complex; extracellular region; endoplasmic reticulum; extracellular exosome
Biological process	negative regulation of endoplasmic reticulum stress-induced neuron intrinsic apoptotic signaling pathway; negative regulation of apoptotic process; receptor-mediated endocytosis; response to endoplasmic reticulum stress; endoplasmic reticulum to Golgi vesicle-mediated transport; IRE1-mediated unfolded protein response; response to ischemia; cellular response to hypoxia; negative regulation of hypoxia-induced intrinsic apoptotic signaling pathway
Sources:Amigo / QuickGO
Orthologs
Databases	NCBI: entry; OMA: entry
Species	Human	Mouse
Entrez	10525	12282
Ensembl	ENSG00000280682; ENSG00000149428	ENSMUSG00000032115
UniProt	Q9Y4L1; Q9BST8	Q9JKR6
RefSeq (mRNA)	NM_001130991; NM_006389	NM_021395
RefSeq (protein)	NP_001124463; NP_006380	NP_067370
Location (UCSC)	Chr 11: 119.04 – 119.06 Mb	Chr 9: 44.29 – 44.3 Mb
PubMed search
- Wikidata
View/Edit Human	View/Edit Mouse

Hypoxia up-regulated protein 1 is a protein that in humans is encoded by the HYOU1 gene.

The protein encoded by this gene belongs to the heat shock protein 70 family. This gene has three mRNAs from the use of alternative transcription sites. A cis-acting segment is found at the 5' end of exon 1A which is involved in the stress-dependent induction. The transcript that begins with exon 1B is preferentially induced by hypoxia, resulting in the accumulation of this protein in the endoplasmic reticulum (ER).

The protein encoded by this gene is thought to play an important role in protein folding and secretion in the ER. Since suppression of the protein is associated with accelerated apoptosis, it is also suggested to have an important cytoprotective role in hypoxia-induced cellular perturbation. This protein has been shown to be up-regulated in tumors, especially in breast tumors, and thus it is associated with tumor invasiveness.

There is also an alternative translation site of this gene which lacks the signal peptide. This signal peptide-lacking protein, is only 3 amino acids shorter than the mature protein in the ER, and it is thought to have a housekeeping function in the cytosol.
