= RAS p21 protein activator 1 =

Protein-coding gene in the species Homo sapiens

RASA1
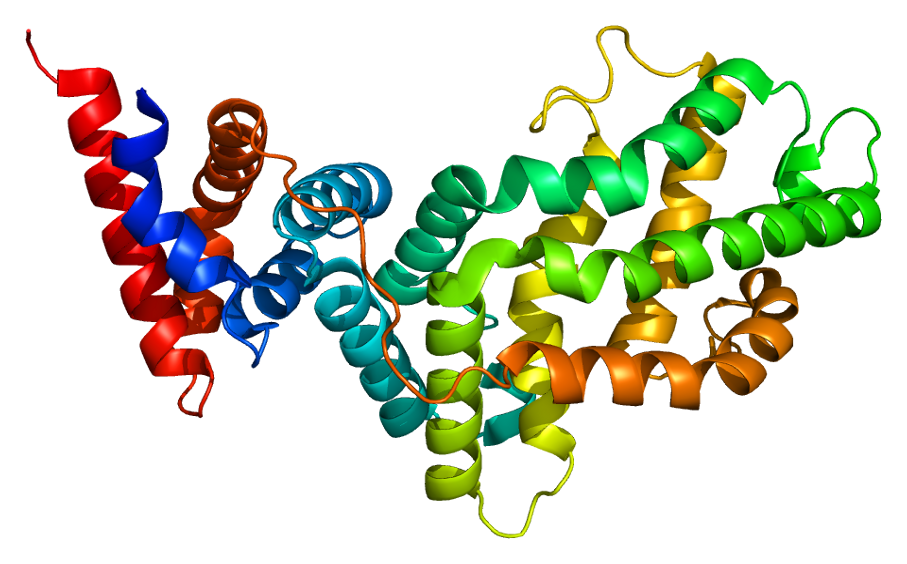

Identifiers
- Aliases: RASA1, CM-AVM, CMAVM, GAP, PKWS, RASA, RASGAP, p120GAP, p120RASGAP, RAS p21 protein activator 1, p120, CMAVM1
- External IDs: OMIM: 139150; MGI: 97860; GeneCards: RASA1
Available structures
PDB	Ortholog search: PDBe RCSB
PDB	List of PDB id codes 1WER, 1WQ1, 2GQI, 2J05, 2J06, 2M51, 4FSS, 2GSB

Gene location (Human)
Chr.	Chromosome 5 (human)
Band	5q14.3	Start	87,267,883 bp
Band	5q14.3	End	87,391,931 bp

Gene location (Mouse)
Chr.	Chromosome 13 (mouse)
Band	13 C3|13 45.05 cM	Start	85,362,899 bp
Band	13 C3|13 45.05 cM	End	85,437,249 bp
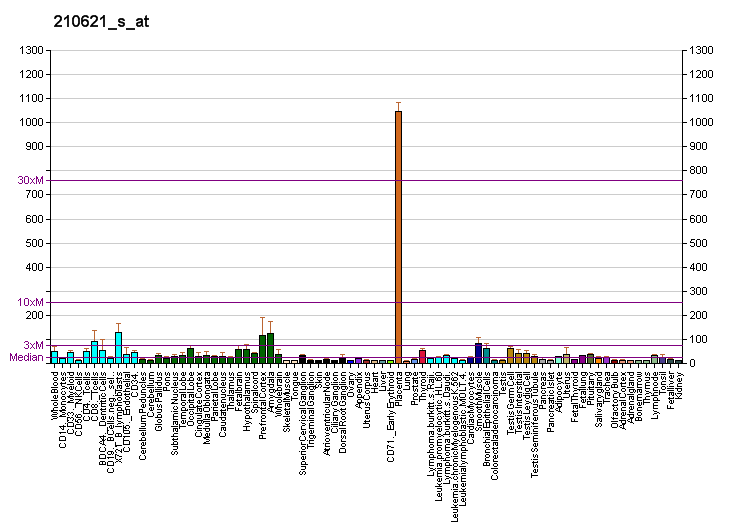

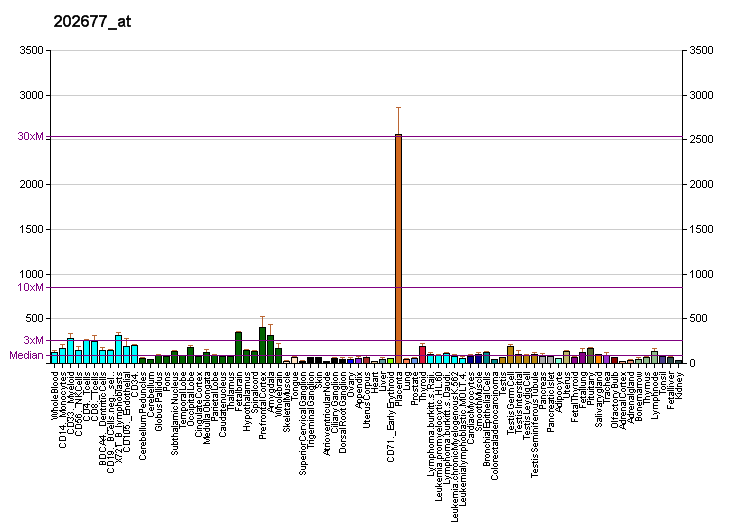
RNA expression pattern
Bgee	Human / Mouse (ortholog); Top expressed in: endothelial cell; placenta; Epithelium of choroid plexus; Brodmann area 23; middle temporal gyrus; retinal pigment epithelium; skin of hip; tibia; Region I of hippocampus proper; Brodmann area 46 / Top expressed in: Rostral migratory stream; ganglionic eminence; Gonadal ridge; ventricular zone; medial ganglionic eminence; tail of embryo; epithelium of lens; dermis; thymus; olfactory bulb; More reference expression data
BioGPS	More reference expression data
Gene ontology
Molecular function	potassium channel inhibitor activity; protein binding; GTPase binding; signaling receptor binding; GTPase activator activity; phosphotyrosine residue binding; GTPase activity
Cellular component	cytoplasm; cytosol; intrinsic component of the cytoplasmic side of the plasma membrane; ruffle; plasma membrane
Biological process	negative regulation of neuron apoptotic process; negative regulation of cell adhesion; intracellular signal transduction; blood vessel morphogenesis; ephrin receptor signaling pathway; regulation of GTPase activity; mitotic cytokinesis; MAPK cascade; negative regulation of Ras protein signal transduction; negative regulation of cell-matrix adhesion; vasculogenesis; regulation of actin filament polymerization; positive regulation of GTPase activity; regulation of RNA metabolic process; regulation of cell shape; signal transduction; negative regulation of apoptotic process
Sources:Amigo / QuickGO
Orthologs
Databases	NCBI: entry; OMA: entry
Species	Human	Mouse
Entrez	5921	218397
Ensembl	ENSG00000145715	ENSMUSG00000021549
UniProt	P20936	E9PYG6
RefSeq (mRNA)	NM_002890; NM_022650	NM_145452
RefSeq (protein)	NP_002881; NP_072179	NP_663427
Location (UCSC)	Chr 5: 87.27 – 87.39 Mb	Chr 13: 85.36 – 85.44 Mb
PubMed search
- Wikidata
View/Edit Human	View/Edit Mouse

RAS p21 protein activator 1 or RasGAP (Ras GTPase activating protein), also known as RASA1, is a 120-kDa cytosolic human protein that provides two principal activities:

- Inactivation of Ras from its active GTP-bound form to its inactive GDP-bound form by enhancing the endogenous GTPase activity of Ras, via its C-terminal GAP domain
- Mitogenic signal transmission towards downstream interacting partners through its N-terminal SH2-SH3-SH2 domains

The protein encoded by this gene is located in the cytoplasm and is part of the GAP1 family of GTPase-activating proteins. The gene product stimulates the GTPase activity of normal RAS p21 but not its oncogenic counterpart. Acting as a suppressor of RAS function, the protein enhances the weak intrinsic GTPase activity of RAS proteins resulting in the inactive GDP-bound form of RAS, thereby allowing control of cellular proliferation and differentiation. Mutations leading to changes in the binding sites of either protein are associated with basal cell carcinomas. Alternative splicing results in two isoforms where the shorter isoform, lacking the N-terminal hydrophobic region but retaining the same activity, appears to be abundantly expressed in placental but not adult tissues.

== Domains ==
RasGAP contains one SH3 domain and two SH2 domains, a PH domain, a C2 domain, and a GAP domain.

== Interactions ==
RAS p21 protein activator 1 has been shown to interact with:

- ANXA6,
- CAV2,
- DNAJA3,
- DOK1,
- EPHB2,
- EPHB3,
- GNB2L1
- HCK,
- HRAS,
- HTT,
- IGF1R,
- KHDRBS1,
- NCK1,
- PDGFRB,
- PTK2B,
- SOCS3, and
- Src.

The mRNA can interact with Mir-132 microRNA; this process is linked to angiogenesis.

== Disease database ==
RASA1 gene variant database
