= HSPA1L =

Protein-coding gene in the species Homo sapiens

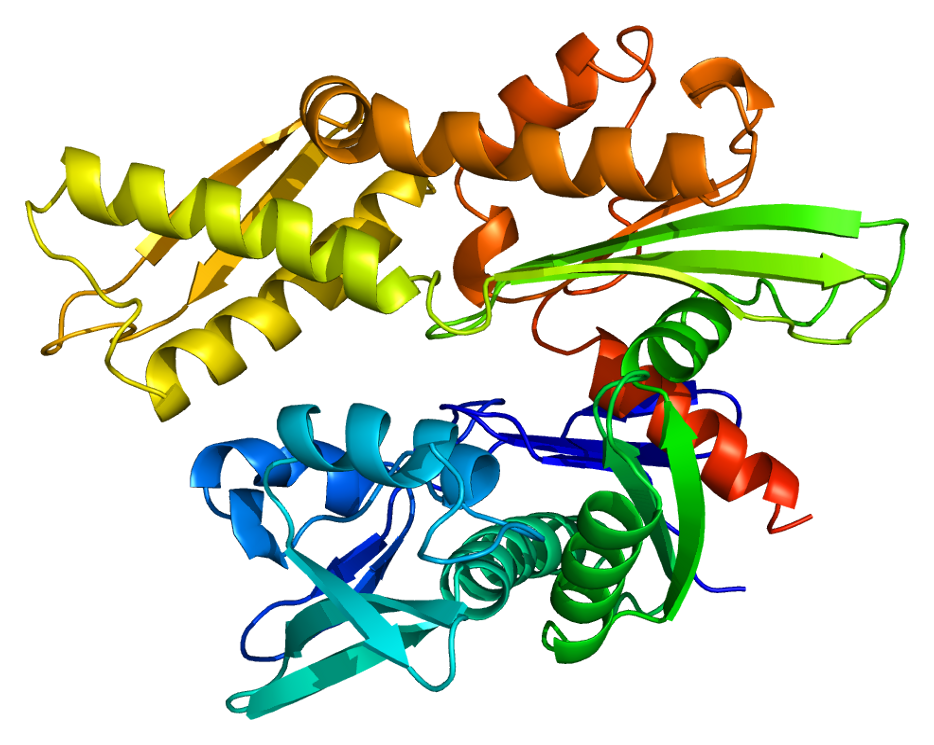

Identifiers
- Aliases: HSPA1L, HSP70-1L, HSP70-HOM, HSP70T, hum70t, heat shock protein family A (Hsp70) member 1 like
- External IDs: OMIM: 140559; MGI: 96231; GeneCards: HSPA1L
Available structures
PDB	Ortholog search: PDBe RCSB
PDB	List of PDB id codes 3GDQ

Gene location (Human)
Chr.	Chromosome 6 (human)
Band	6p21.33	Start	31,809,619 bp
Band	6p21.33	End	31,815,283 bp

Gene location (Mouse)
Chr.	Chromosome 17 (mouse)
Band	17 B1|17 18.51 cM	Start	35,191,679 bp
Band	17 B1|17 18.51 cM	End	35,198,261 bp
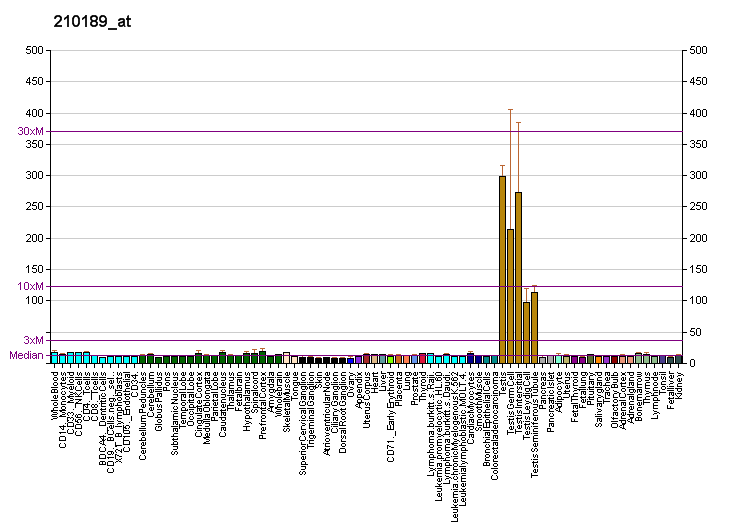
RNA expression pattern
Bgee	Human / Mouse (ortholog); Top expressed in: left testis; right testis; testicle; muscle of thigh; skeletal muscle tissue; gonad; blood; granulocyte; gastrocnemius muscle; ganglionic eminence / Top expressed in: seminiferous tubule; spermatid; soleus muscle; muscle of thigh; spermatocyte; tibialis anterior muscle; intercostal muscle; plantaris muscle; temporal muscle; sternocleidomastoid muscle; More reference expression data
BioGPS	More reference expression data
Gene ontology
Molecular function	unfolded protein binding; nucleotide binding; protein binding; ATP binding; heat shock protein binding; ubiquitin protein ligase binding; ATPase activity; protein folding chaperone activity; misfolded protein binding
Cellular component	COP9 signalosome; cytosol; mitochondrial matrix; blood microparticle; mitochondrion; nucleoplasm; zona pellucida receptor complex; cell body; cytoplasm
Biological process	regulation of cellular response to heat; response to unfolded protein; protein refolding; positive regulation of protein targeting to mitochondrion; binding of sperm to zona pellucida; cellular response to heat; Unfolded protein response; chaperone cofactor-dependent protein refolding
Sources:Amigo / QuickGO
Orthologs
Databases	NCBI: entry; OMA: entry
Species	Human	Mouse
Entrez	3305	15482
Ensembl	ENSG00000234258; ENSG00000226704; ENSG00000236251; ENSG00000204390; ENSG00000206383 n/a	ENSMUSG00000007033
UniProt	P34931	P16627
RefSeq (mRNA)	NM_005527	NM_013558
RefSeq (protein)	NP_005518	NP_038586
Location (UCSC)	Chr 6: 31.81 – 31.82 Mb	Chr 17: 35.19 – 35.2 Mb
PubMed search
- Wikidata
View/Edit Human	View/Edit Mouse

Heat shock 70 kDa protein 1L is a protein that in humans is encoded by the HSPA1L gene on chromosome 6. As a member of the heat shock protein 70 (Hsp70) family and a chaperone protein, it facilitates the proper folding of newly translated and misfolded proteins, as well as stabilize or degrade mutant proteins. Its functions contribute to biological processes including signal transduction, apoptosis, protein homeostasis, and cell growth and differentiation. It has been associated with an extensive number of cancers, neurodegenerative diseases, cell senescence and aging, and Graft-versus-host disease.

== Structure ==
This gene encodes a 70kDa heat shock protein and is located in the major histocompatibility complex class III region, in a cluster with two closely related genes which also encode isoforms of the 70kDa heat shock protein. The amino acid sequence of the encoded protein shares a 90% homology to the isoforms HSPA1A and HSPA1B. As a Hsp70 protein, it has a C-terminal protein substrate-binding domain and an N-terminal ATP-binding domain. The substrate-binding domain consists of two subdomains, a two-layered β-sandwich subdomain (SBDβ) and an α-helical subdomain (SBDα), which are connected by the loop Lα,β. SBDβ contains the peptide binding pocket while SBDα serves as a lid to cover the substrate binding cleft. The ATP binding domain consists of four subdomains split into two lobes by a central ATP/ADP binding pocket. The two terminal domains are linked together by a conserved region referred to as loop LL,1, which is critical for allosteric regulation. The unstructured region at the very end of the C-terminal is believed to be the docking site for co-chaperones.

Since a cDNA clone of this gene contains a 119 bp-region in the 5' UTR, it is likely that HSPA1L contains one or more introns in its own 5' UTR.

== Function ==
In general, HSPA1L is widely distributed across tissues at low abundances, but in particular, it is constitutively and abundantly expressed in the testis.

Along with other heat shock proteins, this protein stabilizes existing proteins against aggregation and mediates the folding of newly translated proteins in the cytosol and in organelles. In order to properly fold non-native proteins, this protein interacts with the hydrophobic peptide segments of proteins in an ATP-controlled fashion. Though the exact mechanism still remains unclear, there are at least two alternative modes of action: kinetic partitioning and local unfolding. In kinetic partitioning, Hsp70s repetitively bind and release substrates in cycles that maintain low concentrations of free substrate. This effectively prevents aggregation while allowing free molecules to fold to the native state. In local unfolding, the binding and release cycles induce localized unfolding in the substrate, which helps to overcome kinetic barriers for folding to the native state. Ultimately, its role in protein folding contributes to its function in signal transduction, apoptosis, protein homeostasis, and cell growth and differentiation.

In addition to the process of protein folding, transport and degradation, this Hsp70 member can preserve the function of mutant proteins. Nonetheless, effects of these mutations can still manifest when Hsp70 chaperones are overwhelmed during stress conditions. Furthermore, this protein enhances antigen-specific tumor immunity by facilitating more efficient antigen presentation to cytotoxic T cells. Though it shares close homology to HSPA1A and HSPA1B, it is regulated differently and is not heat-inducible.

== Clinical significance ==
The Hsp70 member proteins are important apoptotic constituents. During a normal embryologic processes, or during cell injury (such as ischemia-reperfusion injury during heart attacks and strokes) or during developments and processes in cancer, an apoptotic cell undergoes structural changes including cell shrinkage, plasma membrane blebbing, nuclear condensation, and fragmentation of the DNA and nucleus. This is followed by fragmentation into apoptotic bodies that are quickly removed by phagocytes, thereby preventing an inflammatory response. It is a mode of cell death defined by characteristic morphological, biochemical and molecular changes. It was first described as a "shrinkage necrosis", and then this term was replaced by apoptosis to emphasize its role opposite mitosis in tissue kinetics. In later stages of apoptosis the entire cell becomes fragmented, forming a number of plasma membrane-bounded apoptotic bodies which contain nuclear and or cytoplasmic elements. The ultrastructural appearance of necrosis is quite different, the main features being mitochondrial swelling, plasma membrane breakdown and cellular disintegration. Apoptosis occurs in many physiological and pathological processes. It plays an important role during embryonal development as programmed cell death and accompanies a variety of normal involutional processes in which it serves as a mechanism to remove "unwanted" cells.

Hsp70 member proteins, including Hsp72, inhibit apoptosis by acting on the caspase-dependent pathway and against apoptosis-inducing agents such as tumor necrosis factor-α (TNFα), staurosporine, and doxorubicin. This role leads to its involvement in many pathological processes, such as oncogenesis, neurodegeneration, and senescence. In particular, overexpression of HSP72 has been linked to the development some cancers, such as hepatocellular carcinoma, gastric cancers, colon cancers, breast cancers, and lung cancers, which led to its use as a prognostic marker for these cancers. Elevated Hsp70 levels in tumor cells may increase malignancy and resistance to therapy by complexing, and hence, stabilizing, oncofetal proteins and products and transporting them into intracellular sites, thereby promoting tumor cell proliferation. As a result, tumor vaccine strategies for Hsp70s have been highly successful in animal models and progressed to clinical trials. Alternatively, overexpression of Hsp70 can mitigate the effects of neurodegenerative diseases, such as Alzheimer's disease, Parkinson's disease (PD), Huntington's disease, and spinocerebellar ataxias, and aging and cell senescence, as observed in centenarians subjected to heat shock challenge. HSPA1L may fight against PD by co-regulating the translocation of parkin to damaged mitochondria, thus facilitating their removal.

HSPA1L is also involved in Graft-versus-host disease (GVHD) and has potential to serve as a diagnostic/prognostic biomarker. Polymorphisms in the HSPA1L gene, especially those in the substrate binding domain, have been associated with disease.

== Interactions ==
HSPA1L has been shown to interact with PARK2.
