= Interleukin-1 receptor-associated kinase 1–binding protein 1 =

Protein in homo sapiens

IRAK1BP1

Identifiers
- Aliases: IRAK1BP1, AIP70, SIMPL, interleukin 1 receptor associated kinase 1 binding protein 1
- External IDs: OMIM: 615375; MGI: 1929475; GeneCards: IRAK1BP1

Gene location (Human)
Chr.	Chromosome 6 (human)
Band	6q14.1	Start	78,867,551 bp
Band	6q14.1	End	78,946,440 bp

Gene location (Mouse)
Chr.	Chromosome 9 (mouse)
Band	9|9 E2	Start	82,711,593 bp
Band	9|9 E2	End	82,729,740 bp
RNA expression pattern
Bgee	Human / Mouse (ortholog); Top expressed in: oocyte; secondary oocyte; caput epididymis; gonad; corpus epididymis; bronchial epithelial cell; testicle; ventricular zone; ganglionic eminence; tail of epididymis / Top expressed in: spermatocyte; seminiferous tubule; spermatid; barrel cortex; genital tubercle; epithelium of lens; Rostral migratory stream; dorsal striatum; medial ganglionic eminence; nucleus accumbens; More reference expression data
BioGPS	n/a
Gene ontology
Molecular function	protein binding
Cellular component	cytoplasm; nucleus; intracellular anatomical structure
Biological process	regulation of transcription, DNA-templated; immune response; transcription, DNA-templated; I-kappaB kinase/NF-kappaB signaling
Sources:Amigo / QuickGO
Orthologs
Databases	NCBI: entry; OMA: entry
Species	Human	Mouse
Entrez	134728	65099
Ensembl	ENSG00000146243	ENSMUSG00000032251
UniProt	Q5VVH5	Q9ESJ7
RefSeq (mRNA)	NM_001010844	NM_001168240; NM_022986
RefSeq (protein)	NP_001010844	NP_001161712; NP_075362
Location (UCSC)	Chr 6: 78.87 – 78.95 Mb	Chr 9: 82.71 – 82.73 Mb
PubMed search
- Wikidata
View/Edit Human	View/Edit Mouse

Interleukin-1 receptor-associated kinase 1-binding protein 1 is a protein that in humans is encoded by the IRAK1BP1 gene.
