= DNAJA4 =

Protein-coding gene in the species Homo sapiens

Identifiers
- Aliases: DNAJA4, MST104, MSTP104, PRO1472, DnaJ heat shock protein family (Hsp40) member A4
- External IDs: MGI: 1927638; GeneCards: DNAJA4

Gene location (Human)
Chr.	Chromosome 15 (human)
Band	15q25.1	Start	78,264,086 bp
Band	15q25.1	End	78,282,196 bp

Gene location (Mouse)
Chr.	Chromosome 9 (mouse)
Band	9|9 A5.3	Start	54,606,157 bp
Band	9|9 A5.3	End	54,623,599 bp
RNA expression pattern
Bgee	Human / Mouse (ortholog); Top expressed in: bronchial epithelial cell; right testis; left testis; sperm; right ventricle; right auricle of heart; muscle of thigh; Skeletal muscle tissue of rectus abdominis; biceps brachii; body of tongue / Top expressed in: seminiferous tubule; interventricular septum; soleus muscle; ankle; utricle; digastric muscle; temporal muscle; sternocleidomastoid muscle; esophagus; masseter muscle; More reference expression data
BioGPS	n/a
Gene ontology
Molecular function	protein binding; unfolded protein binding; chaperone binding; ATP binding; heat shock protein binding; metal ion binding
Cellular component	membrane; cytosol
Biological process	protein folding; negative regulation of inclusion body assembly; protein refolding; response to heat; negative regulation of endothelial cell migration; positive regulation of gene expression
Sources:Amigo / QuickGO
Orthologs
Databases	NCBI: entry; OMA: entry
Species	Human	Mouse
Entrez	55466	58233
Ensembl	ENSG00000140403	ENSMUSG00000032285
UniProt	Q8WW22	Q9JMC3
RefSeq (mRNA)	NM_001130182; NM_001130183; NM_018602	NM_021422; NM_001357875
RefSeq (protein)	NP_001123654; NP_001123655; NP_061072	NP_067397; NP_001344804
Location (UCSC)	Chr 15: 78.26 – 78.28 Mb	Chr 9: 54.61 – 54.62 Mb
PubMed search
- Wikidata
View/Edit Human	View/Edit Mouse

DnaJ heat shock protein family (Hsp40) member A4 is a protein that in humans is encoded by the DNAJA4 gene.
