= DNAJB11 =

Protein-coding gene in the species Homo sapiens

Identifiers
- Aliases: DNAJB11, ABBP-2, ABBP2, DJ9, Dj-9, EDJ, ERdj3, ERj3, ERj3p, PRO1080, UNQ537, DnaJ heat shock protein family (Hsp40) member B11, PKD6
- External IDs: OMIM: 611341; MGI: 1915088; GeneCards: DNAJB11

Gene location (Human)
Chr.	Chromosome 3 (human)
Band	3q27.3	Start	186,567,403 bp
Band	3q27.3	End	186,585,800 bp

Gene location (Mouse)
Chr.	Chromosome 16 (mouse)
Band	16|16 B1	Start	22,676,595 bp
Band	16|16 B1	End	22,698,384 bp
RNA expression pattern
Bgee	Human / Mouse (ortholog); Top expressed in: Achilles tendon; right lobe of liver; colon; body of pancreas; adrenal gland; thyroid gland; testicle / Top expressed in: Ileal epithelium; tail of embryo; molar; right kidney; aortic valve; ascending aorta; yolk sac; genital tubercle; seminal vesicula; spermatocyte; More reference expression data
BioGPS	n/a
Gene ontology
Molecular function	unfolded protein binding; protein binding
Cellular component	endoplasmic reticulum lumen; endoplasmic reticulum; membrane; nucleus; cytoplasm; endoplasmic reticulum chaperone complex
Biological process	IRE1-mediated unfolded protein response; positive regulation of ATP-dependent activity; protein folding; mRNA modification; protein maturation
Sources:Amigo / QuickGO
Orthologs
Databases	NCBI: entry; OMA: entry
Species	Human	Mouse
Entrez	51726	67838
Ensembl	ENSG00000090520	ENSMUSG00000004460
UniProt	Q9UBS4	Q99KV1
RefSeq (mRNA)	NM_016306	NM_001190804; NM_001190805; NM_026400
RefSeq (protein)	NP_057390; NP_001365380	NP_001177733; NP_001177734; NP_080676
Location (UCSC)	Chr 3: 186.57 – 186.59 Mb	Chr 16: 22.68 – 22.7 Mb
PubMed search
- Wikidata
View/Edit Human	View/Edit Mouse

DnaJ homolog subfamily B member 11 is a protein that in humans is encoded by the DNAJB11 gene.
