= DNAJA2 =

Protein-coding gene in the species Homo sapiens

Identifiers
- Aliases: DNAJA2, CPR3, DJ3, DJA2, DNAJ, DNJ3, HIRIP4, PRO3015, RDJ2, DnaJ heat shock protein family (Hsp40) member A2
- External IDs: OMIM: 611322; MGI: 1931882; GeneCards: DNAJA2

Gene location (Human)
Chr.	Chromosome 16 (human)
Band	16q11.2	Start	46,955,362 bp
Band	16q11.2	End	46,973,674 bp

Gene location (Mouse)
Chr.	Chromosome 8 (mouse)
Band	8|8 C3	Start	86,264,262 bp
Band	8|8 C3	End	86,281,973 bp
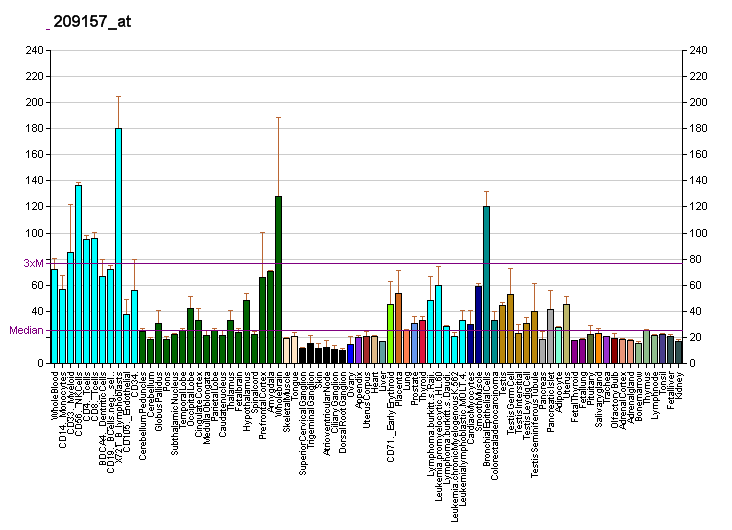
RNA expression pattern
Bgee	Human / Mouse (ortholog); Top expressed in: Achilles tendon; gastrocnemius muscle; endothelial cell; sperm; muscle of thigh; Skeletal muscle tissue of rectus abdominis; germinal epithelium; mucosa of paranasal sinus; right auricle of heart; prefrontal cortex / Top expressed in: neural layer of retina; triceps brachii muscle; sternocleidomastoid muscle; medial ganglionic eminence; temporal muscle; digastric muscle; urothelium; abdominal wall; transitional epithelium of urinary bladder; atrioventricular valve; More reference expression data
BioGPS	More reference expression data
Gene ontology
Molecular function	unfolded protein binding; chaperone binding; protein binding; ATP binding; heat shock protein binding; metal ion binding; ATPase activator activity
Cellular component	extracellular exosome; membrane; cytosol
Biological process	response to heat; protein folding; protein refolding; positive regulation of cell population proliferation; positive regulation of ATP-dependent activity
Sources:Amigo / QuickGO
Orthologs
Databases	NCBI: entry; OMA: entry
Species	Human	Mouse
Entrez	10294	56445
Ensembl	ENSG00000069345	ENSMUSG00000031701
UniProt	O60884	Q9QYJ0
RefSeq (mRNA)	NM_005880	NM_019794
RefSeq (protein)	NP_005871	NP_062768
Location (UCSC)	Chr 16: 46.96 – 46.97 Mb	Chr 8: 86.26 – 86.28 Mb
PubMed search
- Wikidata
View/Edit Human	View/Edit Mouse

DnaJ homolog subfamily A member 2 is a protein that in humans is encoded by the DNAJA2 gene.

The protein encoded by this gene shares sequence similarity with Hir1p and Hir2p, the two corepressors of histone gene transcription characterized in the yeast, Saccharomyces cerevisiae. The structural features of this protein suggest that it may function as part of a multiprotein complex. Several cDNAs encoding interacting proteins, HIRIPs, have been identified. HIRIP4 was isolated by virtue of its interaction with this protein; however, its exact function is not known. The sequence of HIRIP4 protein is highly homologous to the human DNJ3/CPR3, mouse Dj3 and rat Dj2 gene products.
