= HSPA4L =

Protein-coding gene in the species Homo sapiens

Identifiers
- Aliases: HSPA4L, APG-1, HSPH3, Osp94, heat shock protein family A (Hsp70) member 4 like, APG1
- External IDs: MGI: 107422; GeneCards: HSPA4L

Gene location (Human)
Chr.	Chromosome 4 (human)
Band	4q28.1	Start	127,781,821 bp
Band	4q28.1	End	127,840,733 bp

Gene location (Mouse)
Chr.	Chromosome 3 (mouse)
Band	3|3 B	Start	40,699,814 bp
Band	3|3 B	End	40,750,538 bp
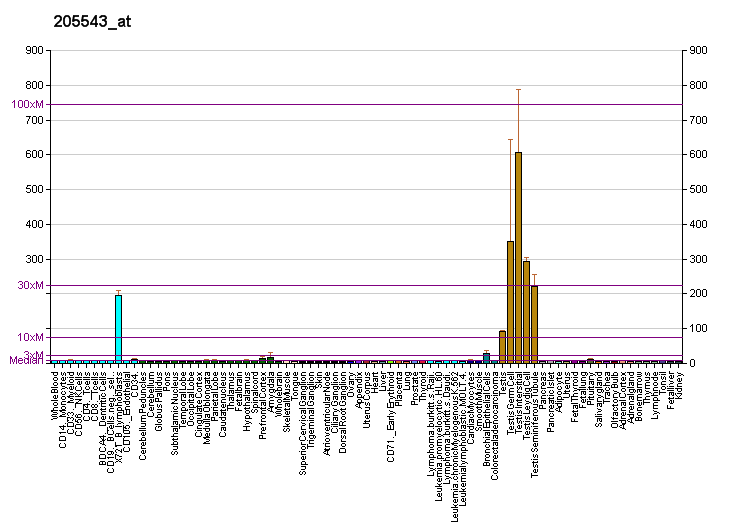
RNA expression pattern
Bgee	Human / Mouse (ortholog); Top expressed in: sperm; left testis; right testis; Brodmann area 23; secondary oocyte; postcentral gyrus; pons; gonad; pars compacta; bronchial epithelial cell / Top expressed in: spermatid; spermatocyte; neural layer of retina; primary visual cortex; dentate gyrus of hippocampal formation granule cell; superior frontal gyrus; zygote; ventricular zone; esophagus; right kidney; More reference expression data
BioGPS	More reference expression data
Gene ontology
Molecular function	nucleotide binding; ATP binding
Cellular component	cytoplasm; cytosol; nucleus
Biological process	response to unfolded protein; protein folding
Sources:Amigo / QuickGO
Orthologs
Databases	NCBI: entry; OMA: entry
Species	Human	Mouse
Entrez	22824	18415
Ensembl	ENSG00000164070	ENSMUSG00000025757
UniProt	O95757	P48722
RefSeq (mRNA)	NM_014278; NM_001317381; NM_001317382; NM_001317383	NM_011020
RefSeq (protein)	NP_001304310; NP_001304311; NP_001304312; NP_055093	NP_035150
Location (UCSC)	Chr 4: 127.78 – 127.84 Mb	Chr 3: 40.7 – 40.75 Mb
PubMed search
- Wikidata
View/Edit Human	View/Edit Mouse

Heat shock 70 kDa protein 4L is a protein that in humans is encoded by the HSPA4L gene.
