= DNAJC9 =

Protein-coding gene in the species Homo sapiens

An Error has occurred retrieving Wikidata item for infobox DnaJ (Hsp40) homolog, subfamily C, member 9 is a protein that in humans is encoded by the DNAJC9 gene.
