= HSPA6 =

Protein-coding gene in humans

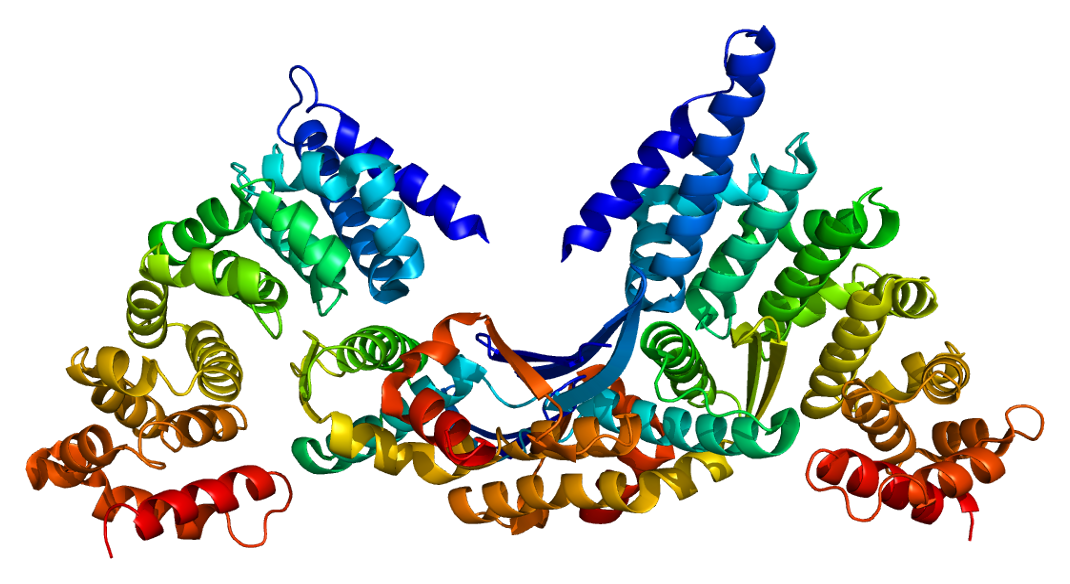

Identifiers
- Aliases: HSPA6, HSP70B', heat shock protein family A (Hsp70) member 6
- External IDs: OMIM: 140555; GeneCards: HSPA6
Available structures
| PDB | Human UniProt search: PDBe RCSB |
| PDB | List of PDB id codes 3FE1 |

Gene location (Human)
| Chr. | Chromosome 1 (human) |
| Band | 1q23.3 | Start | 161,524,540 bp |
| Band | 1q23.3 | End | 161,526,894 bp |
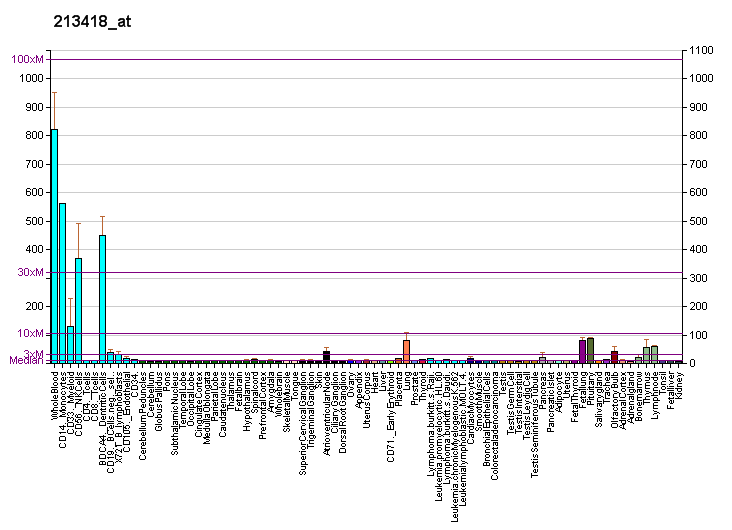

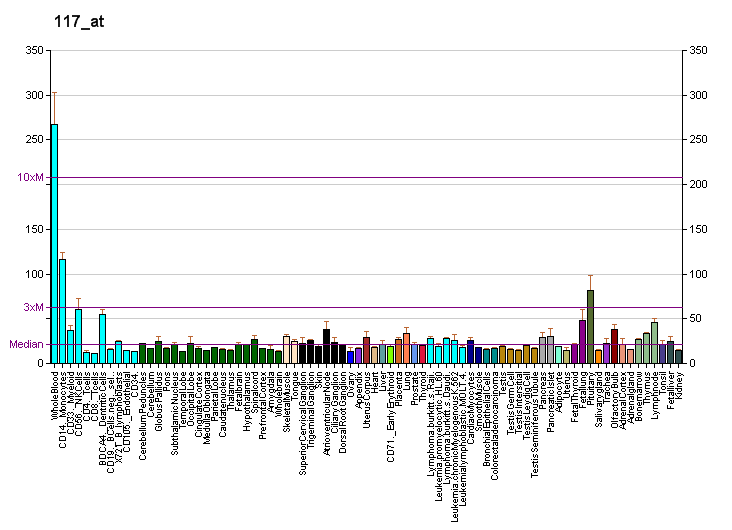
RNA expression pattern
| Bgee | Human / Mouse (ortholog); Top expressed in: blood; granulocyte; monocyte; spleen; upper lobe of left lung; C1 segment; placenta; testicle; left adrenal cortex; right adrenal cortex / n/a; More reference expression data |
| BioGPS | More reference expression data |
Gene ontology
| Molecular function | enzyme binding; unfolded protein binding; nucleotide binding; protein binding; ATP binding; heat shock protein binding; ATPase activity; protein folding chaperone activity; misfolded protein binding |
| Cellular component | cytoplasm; centriole; COP9 signalosome; cytosol; extracellular exosome; blood microparticle; extracellular region; secretory granule lumen; ficolin-1-rich granule lumen; nucleus; protein-containing complex |
| Biological process | cellular heat acclimation; response to unfolded protein; cellular response to heat; protein refolding; neutrophil degranulation; Unfolded protein response; chaperone cofactor-dependent protein refolding |
Sources:Amigo / QuickGO
Orthologs
| Databases | NCBI: entry; OMA: entry |
| Species | Human | Mouse |
| Entrez | 3310 | n/a |
| Ensembl | ENSG00000173110 | n/a |
| UniProt | P17066 | n/a |
| RefSeq (mRNA) | NM_002155 | n/a |
| RefSeq (protein) | NP_002146 | n/a |
| Location (UCSC) | Chr 1: 161.52 – 161.53 Mb | n/a |
| PubMed search | | n/a |
- Wikidata
| View/Edit Human |

Heat shock 70 kDa protein 6 is a protein that in humans is encoded by the HSPA6 gene.
