= Nucleotide exchange factor =

Movie of ELMO-YFP recruitment to sites of attached anti-ICAM-1 beads on TNF-α-treated MAECs isolated from SGEF−/− animals. The arrow indicates the location on an attaching anti-ICAM-1 bead.

Nucleotide exchange factors (NEFs) are proteins that stimulate the exchange (replacement) of nucleoside diphosphates for nucleoside triphosphates bound to other proteins.

== Function ==
Many cellular proteins cleave (hydrolyze) nucleoside triphosphates – adenosine triphosphate (ATP) or guanosine triphosphate (GTP) – to their diphosphate forms (ADP and GDP) as a source of energy and to drive conformational changes. These changes in turn affect the structural, enzymatic, or signalling properties of the protein.

Nucleotide exchange factors actively assist in the exchange of depleted nucleoside diphosphates for fresh nucleoside triphosphates. NEFs are specific for the nucleotides they exchange (ADP or GDP, but not both) and are often specific to a single protein or class of proteins with which they interact.

== See also ==
- Nucleoside-diphosphate kinase
- Guanine nucleotide exchange factor
