= Co-chaperone =

Class of enzymes

Co-chaperones are proteins that assist chaperones in protein folding and other functions. Co-chaperones are the non-client binding molecules that assist in protein folding mediated by Hsp70 and Hsp90. They are particularly essential in stimulation of the ATPase activity of these chaperone proteins. There are a great number of different co-chaperones however based on their domain structure most of them fall into two groups: J-domain proteins and tetratricopeptide repeats (TPR).

Co-chaperones assist heat shock proteins in the protein folding process. These co-chaperones can function in a number of ways. Primarily co-chaperones are involved in the ATPase functionality of their associated heat shock proteins. Co-chaperones catalyze the hydrolysis ATP to ADP on their respective chaperones which then allows them undergo a large conformational change that allows them to either bind to their substrates with higher affinity or aid in the release of the substrate following protein folding, as in the case of co-chaperone p23.

J-proteins, DnaJ or Hsp40 are important co-chaperones for Hsp70 and have the ability to bind to polypeptides and then recruit chaperone protein DnaK and passes the polypeptide along to this chaperone by catalyzing ATP hydrolysis that allows DnaK to bind to the unfolded polypeptide with high affinity. Another co-chaperone, GrpE, comes in following the folding of this protein to cause a conformational change in DnaK that allows it to release the folded protein. The mechanism of TPR proteins is less studied these domains have been shown to interact with Hsp90 and Hsp70 and may be involved in the creation of an Hsp70-Hsp90 multi-chaperone complex.

Co-chaperones may also play an important role in misfolding diseases such as cystic fibrosis. An interaction between Hsp90 and its co-chaperone, Aha1, is essential to the proper folding of cystic fibrosis transmembrane conductance regulator (CFTR). Other examples of co-chaperone's role in illness include neurodegenerative diseases. Alzheimer’s and Parkinson’s disease have a number of proteins that can aggregate if not properly chaperoned. Co-chaperones CSPα (DNAJC5), auxilin (DNAJC6) and RME-8 (DNAJC13) are important for preserving folding and assembly, therefore preventing protein aggregation. Detection of mutations in these proteins have been associated with the early onset of neurodegenerative diseases.

== List of co-chaperones ==
- Aha1
- auxilin
- BAG1
- CAIR-1/Bag-3
- CDC37/p50
- Chp1
- Cysteine string protein (CSP)
- Cyp40
- Djp1
- DnaJ
- E3/E4-ubiquitin ligase
- FKBP4
- GAK
- GroES
- GrpE
- Hch1
- Hip (Hsc70-interacting protein)/ST13
- Hop (Hsp70/Hsp90 organizing protein)/STIP1
- Mrj
- PP5
- Sacsin
- SGT
- Snl1
- SODD/Bag-4
- Swa2/Aux1
- Tom34
- Tom70
- UNC-45
- WISp39

== See also ==
- Chaperone (protein)
- Heat shock protein
