= HSP90AB1 =

Protein-coding gene in the species Homo sapiens

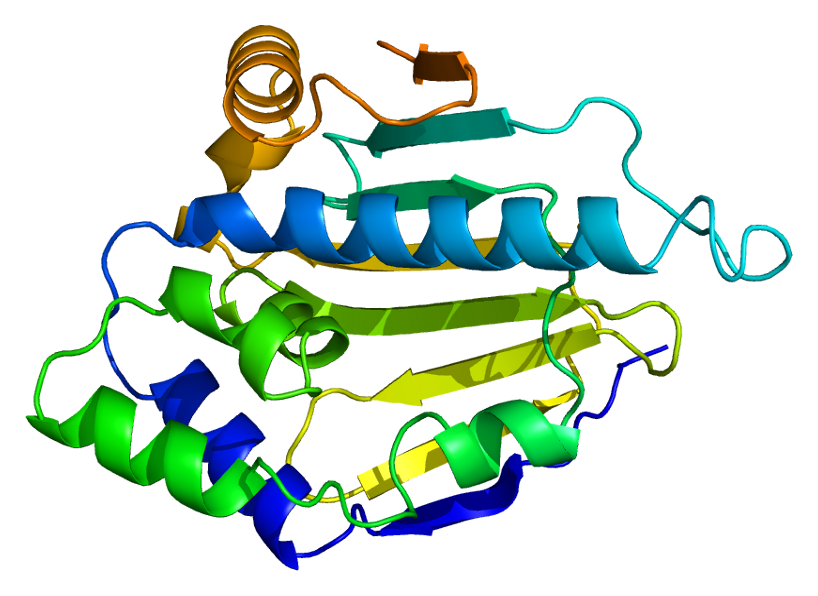

Identifiers
- Aliases: HSP90AB1, D6S182, HSP84, HSP90B, HSPC2, HSPCB, heat shock protein 90kDa alpha family class B member 1, heat shock protein 90 alpha family class B member 1
- External IDs: OMIM: 140572; MGI: 96247; GeneCards: HSP90AB1
Available structures
PDB	Ortholog search: PDBe RCSB
PDB	List of PDB id codes 1QZ2, 1UYM, 2L6J, 3FWV, 3NMQ, 3PRY, 3UQ3, 5FWL, 5FWM, 5FWK

Gene location (Human)
Chr.	Chromosome 6 (human)
Band	6p21.1	Start	44,246,166 bp
Band	6p21.1	End	44,253,888 bp

Gene location (Mouse)
Chr.	Chromosome 17 (mouse)
Band	17 B3|17 22.59 cM	Start	45,878,701 bp
Band	17 B3|17 22.59 cM	End	45,884,197 bp
RNA expression pattern
Bgee	Human / Mouse (ortholog); Top expressed in: frontal pole; Brodmann area 10; paraflocculus of cerebellum; lateral nuclear group of thalamus; middle frontal gyrus; pars compacta; pons; tibialis anterior muscle; pars reticulata; spinal ganglia / Top expressed in: mandibular prominence; Gonadal ridge; maxillary prominence; epiblast; tail of embryo; primitive streak; gastrula; subiculum; hand; habenula; More reference expression data
BioGPS	n/a
Gene ontology
Molecular function	nucleotide binding; transmembrane transporter binding; unfolded protein binding; GTP binding; histone deacetylase binding; UTP binding; nitric-oxide synthase regulator activity; kinase binding; MHC class II protein complex binding; protein kinase regulator activity; CTP binding; dATP binding; double-stranded RNA binding; TPR domain binding; sulfonylurea receptor binding; protein kinase binding; RNA binding; ATP binding; heat shock protein binding; peptide binding; protein homodimerization activity; ATP-dependent protein binding; cadherin binding; protein dimerization activity; DNA polymerase binding; disordered domain specific binding; histone methyltransferase binding; protein binding; identical protein binding; ubiquitin protein ligase binding; tau protein binding
Cellular component	cytoplasm; melanosome; intracellular anatomical structure; nucleoplasm; cell surface; brush border membrane; basolateral plasma membrane; apical plasma membrane; mitochondrion; inclusion body; COP9 signalosome; extracellular exosome; ooplasm; sperm head plasma membrane; lysosomal membrane; extracellular region; nucleus; cytosol; plasma membrane; membrane; aryl hydrocarbon receptor complex; secretory granule lumen; ficolin-1-rich granule lumen; protein-containing complex; soma; dendritic growth cone; axonal growth cone; perinuclear region of cytoplasm; HSP90-CDC37 chaperone complex
Biological process	negative regulation of neuron apoptotic process; cellular response to interleukin-4; response to salt stress; Fc-gamma receptor signaling pathway involved in phagocytosis; placenta development; positive regulation of nitric oxide biosynthetic process; regulation of protein ubiquitination; cellular response to organic cyclic compound; response to stress; negative regulation of apoptotic process; response to organic substance; supramolecular fiber organization; positive regulation of protein serine/threonine kinase activity; response to unfolded protein; regulation of type I interferon-mediated signaling pathway; regulation of interferon-gamma-mediated signaling pathway; protein folding; positive regulation of cell size; regulation of cellular response to heat; positive regulation of protein binding; virion attachment to host cell; protein stabilization; positive regulation of phosphoprotein phosphatase activity; response to cocaine; negative regulation of complement-dependent cytotoxicity; xenobiotic metabolic process; telomere maintenance via telomerase; positive regulation of transforming growth factor beta receptor signaling pathway; negative regulation of proteasomal ubiquitin-dependent protein catabolic process; neutrophil degranulation; positive regulation of cell differentiation; chaperone-mediated protein complex assembly; positive regulation of telomerase activity; negative regulation of transforming growth factor beta activation; telomerase holoenzyme complex assembly; positive regulation of protein localization to cell surface; central nervous system neuron axonogenesis; establishment of cell polarity; positive regulation of peptidyl-serine phosphorylation; axon extension; negative regulation of protein metabolic process; positive regulation of protein kinase B signaling; negative regulation of proteasomal protein catabolic process; positive regulation of tau-protein kinase activity; positive regulation of cyclin-dependent protein kinase activity
Sources:Amigo / QuickGO
Orthologs
Databases	NCBI: entry; OMA: entry
Species	Human	Mouse
Entrez	3326	15516
Ensembl	ENSG00000096384	ENSMUSG00000023944
UniProt	P08238; Q6PK50	P11499
RefSeq (mRNA)	NM_001271969; NM_001271970; NM_001271971; NM_001271972; NM_007355 NM_001371238	NM_008302
RefSeq (protein)	NP_001258898; NP_001258899; NP_001258900; NP_001258901; NP_031381 NP_001358167; NP_001258901.1	NP_032328
Location (UCSC)	Chr 6: 44.25 – 44.25 Mb	Chr 17: 45.88 – 45.88 Mb
PubMed search
- Wikidata
View/Edit Human	View/Edit Mouse

Heat shock protein HSP 90-beta also called HSP90beta is a protein that in humans is encoded by the HSP90AB1 gene.

== Function ==
HSP90AB1 is a molecular chaperone. Chaperones are proteins that bind to other proteins, thereby stabilizing them in an ATP-dependent manner. Chaperones stabilize new proteins during translation, mature proteins which are partially unstable but also proteins that have become partially denatured due to various kinds of cellular stress. In case proper folding or refolding is impossible, HSPs mediate protein degradation. They also have specialized functions, such as intracellular transport into organelles.

== Classification ==
Human HSPs are classified into 5 major groups according to the HGNC:

- HSP70
- DnaJ (HSP40)
- HSPB (small heat shock proteins)
- HSPC (HSP90)
- chaperonins

Chaperonins are characterized by their barrel-shaped structure with binding sites for client proteins inside the barrels.

The human HSP90 group consists of 5 members according to the HGNC:

- HSP90AA1 (heat shock protein 90 kDa alpha, class A, member 1)
- HSP90AA3P (heat shock protein 90 alpha family class A member 3, pseudogene)
- HSP90AB1 (heat shock protein 90 kDa alpha, class B, member 1) (this protein)
- HSP90B1 (heat shock protein 90 kDA beta, member 1)
- TRAP1 (TNF receptor associated protein 1)

Whereas HSP90AA1 and HSP90AB1 are located primarily in the cytoplasm of the cells, HSP90B1 can be found in the endoplasmic reticulum and Trap1 in mitochondria.

== Co-chaperones ==
Co-chaperones bind to HSPs and influence their activity, substrate (client) specificity and interaction with other HSPs. For example, the co-chaperone CDC37 (cell division cycle 37) stabilizes the cell cycle regulatory proteins CDK4 (cyclin dependent kinase 4) and Cdk6. Hop (HSP organizing protein) mediates the interaction between different HSPs, forming HSP70–HSP90 complexes. TOM70 (translocase of the outer mitochondrial membrane of ~70 kDa) mediates translocation of client proteins through the import pore into the mitochondrial matrix.

== Isoforms ==
Human HPS90AB1 shares 60% overall homology to its closest relative HSP90AA1. Murine HSP90AB1 was cloned in 1987 based on homology of the corresponding Drosophila melanogaster gene.

== Protein structure ==
HSP90AB1 is active as homodimer, forming a V-shaped structure. It consists of three major domains:

- N-terminal domain (NTD) containing the ATP binding site
- middle domain, primarily responsible for substrate binding
- C-terminal domain (CTD) which is the dimerization domain (base of the V).

Between these domains, there are short charged domains. Co-chaperones primarily bind to the NTD and CTD. The latter Co-chaperones usually contain a tetratricopeptide repeat (TPR) domain which binds to a MEEVD motif at the C-terminus of the HSP. Inhibition of HSP90 activity by geldanamycin derivatives is based on their binding to the ATP binding site.

== Client proteins ==
Client proteins are steroid hormone receptors, kinases, ubiquitin ligases, transcription factors and proteins from many more families. Examples of HSP90AB1 client proteins are p38MAPK/MAPK14 (mitogen activated protein kinase 14), ERK5 (extracellular regulated kinase 5), or the checkpoint kinase Wee1.

== Clinical significance ==
Cystic fibrosis (CF, mucoviscidosis) is a genetic disease with increased viscosity of various secretions leading to organ failure of lung, pancreas and other organs. It is caused in nearly all cases by a deletion of phenylalanine 508 of CFTR (cystic fibrosis transmembrane conductance regulator). This mutation causes a maturation defect of this ion channel protein with increased degradation, mediated by HSPs. Deletion of the co-chaperone AHA1 (activator of heat shock 90kDa protein ATPase homolog 1) leads to stabilization of CFTR and opens up a perspective for a new therapy.

=== Cancer ===
HSP90AB1 and its co-chaperones are frequently overexpressed in cancer cells. They are able to stabilize mutant proteins thereby allowing survival and increased proliferation of cancer cells. This renders HSPs potential targets for cancer treatment. In salivary gland tumors, expression of HSP90AA1 and HSP90AB1 correlates with malignancy, proliferation and metastasis. The same is basically true for lung cancers where a correlation with survival was found.
