= GHKL domain =

Evolutionary conserved protein domain

Histidine kinase-, DNA gyrase B-, and HSP90-like ATPase
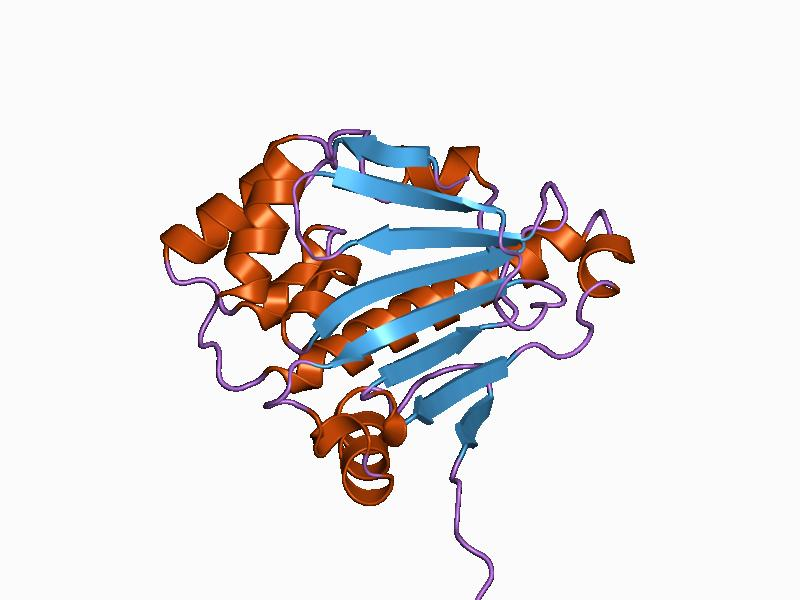
- Structure of the N-terminal domain of the yeast Hsp90 chaperone.

Identifiers
- Symbol: HATPase_c
- Pfam: PF02518
- InterPro: IPR003594
- SMART: HATPase_c
- SCOP2: 1ei1 / SCOPe / SUPFAM
- CDD: cd00075
Available protein structures:
- Pfam: structures / ECOD
- PDB: RCSB PDB; PDBe; PDBj
- PDBsum: structure summary
- PDB: 1ys3B:338-445 1ysrB:338-445 1id0A:374-479 2c2aA:365-479 1i58A:398-540 1b3qB:398-540 1i5bA:398-540 1i5aB:398-540 1i5dA:398-540 1i5cB:398-540 1i59B:398-540 1y8nA:236-361 1y8oA:236-361 1y8pA:236-361 1jm6A:240-363 1gkxA:264-403 1gkzA:264-403 1gjvA:264-403 1nhjA:18-79 1nhiA:18-79 1nhhA:18-79 1b62A:18-79 1bknB:20-73 1b63A:18-79 1h7sA:30-164 1h7uA:30-164 1ea6B:30-164 1mx0D:27-179 1mu5A:27-179 1z5bA:27-179 1z5cB:27-179 1z59A:27-179 1z5aB:27-179 1thnC:35-136 1tidC:35-136 1l0oA:35-136 1tilE:35-136 1th8A:35-136 1ah6 :26-180 1us7A:26-180 1amw :26-180 2breA:26-180 2akpB:26-180 1a4h :26-180 1ah8A:26-180 2brcA:26-180 1am1 :26-180 1bgqA:26-180 1yc4A:40-193 1uygA:40-193 2bt0A:40-193 1uycA:40-193 1yer :40-193 1yc3A:40-193 1uy8A:40-193 2bz5A:40-193 1uyeA:40-193 2byhA:40-193 1yc1A:40-193 1uyhA:40-193 1uy9A:40-193 1uydA:40-193 1uy6A:40-193 1uy7A:40-193 2bsmA:40-193 1yes :40-193 1uylA:40-193 1uyiA:40-193 2byiA:40-193 1uyfA:40-193 1byqA:40-193 1uykA:40-193 1osfA:40-193 1yet :40-193 1uymA:35-188 1tc0B:96-254 1yszA:96-254 1u2oB:96-254 1yt0A:96-254 1tbwA:96-254 1qyeA:96-254 1u0zA:96-254 1yt2A:96-254 1tc6A:96-254 1u0yA:96-254 1qy8A:96-254 1yt1A:96-254 1qy5A:96-254 1y4uB:27-183 1y4sA:27-183 1kijA:28-173 1s16A:27-172 1s14B:27-172 1pvgA:55-204 1qzrB:55-204 1zxnC:76-224 1zxmA:76-224

The GHKL domain (Gyrase, Hsp90, Histidine Kinase, MutL) is an evolutionary conserved protein domain. It is an ATPase domain found in several ATP-binding proteins such as histidine kinase, DNA gyrase B, topoisomerases, heat shock protein HSP90, phytochrome-like ATPases and DNA mismatch repair proteins.

More information about this protein can be found at Protein of the Month: DNA Topoisomerase.

== Structure ==
The fold of this domain consists of two layers, alpha/beta, which contain an 8-stranded mixed beta-sheet.

== Subfamilies ==
- Heat shock protein Hsp90, N-terminal

InterPro: IPR020575

- Sensor histidine kinase NatK, C-terminal domain

InterPro: IPR032834

== Members ==
- BCKDK
- HSP90AA1, HSP90AB1, HSP90B1
- MLH1, MLH3, MORC1, MORC2, MORC3, MORC4
- PDK1, PDK2, PDK3, PDK4
- PMS1, PMS2, PMS2L1, PMS2L11, PMS2L3, PMS4L
- TOP2A, TOP2B
- TRAP1, TRRAP
