= AHSA2 =

Mammalian protein found in humans

AHA1, activator of heat shock 90kDa protein ATPase homolog 2 (yeast)

Identifiers
- Symbol: AHSA2
- Alt. symbols: Hch1
- NCBI gene: 130872
- HGNC: 20437
- RefSeq: NM_152392
- UniProt: Q719I0

Other data
- Locus: Chr. 2 p14
Search for
- Structures: Swiss-model
- Domains: InterPro

AHSA2 also known as AHA1, activator of heat shock 90kDa protein ATPase homolog 2 (yeast) is a human gene which encodes a protein which acts as co-chaperone of Hsp90 (heat shock protein 90). AHSA2 and the related AHSA1 belongs to the AHA (Activator of Hsp90 ATPase) family of stress-regulated proteins that bind directly to Hsp90 and are required for Hsp90-dependent activation of client proteins.
