= CDC37 =

Protein-coding gene in humans

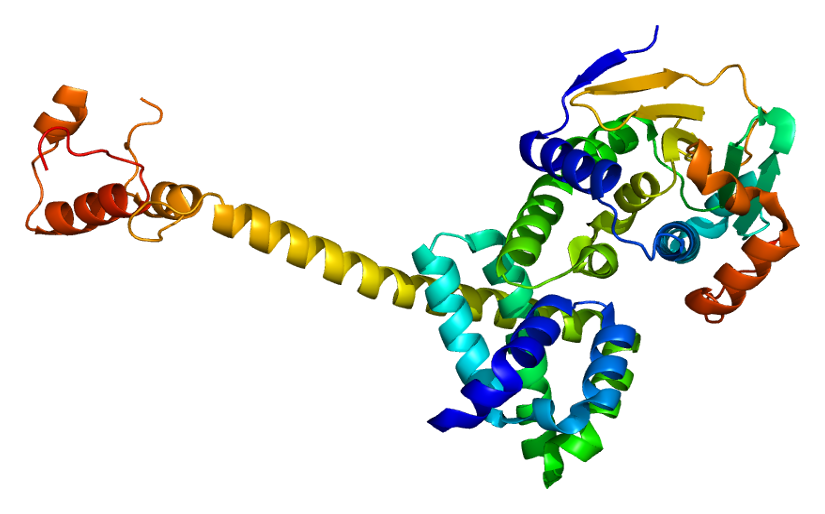
Available structures
PDB	Ortholog search: PDBe RCSB
PDB	List of PDB id codes 1US7, 2K5B, 2W0G, 2N5X, 2NCA, 5FWM, 5FWL, 5FWK

Identifiers
- Aliases: CDC37, P50cell division cycle 37, cell division cycle 37, HSP90 cochaperone
- External IDs: OMIM: 605065; MGI: 109531; HomoloGene: 38268; GeneCards: CDC37; OMA:CDC37 - orthologs

Gene location (Human)
Chr.	Chromosome 19 (human)
Band	19p13.2	Start	10,391,133 bp
Band	19p13.2	End	10,420,121 bp

Gene location (Mouse)
Chr.	Chromosome 9 (mouse)
Band	9|9 A3	Start	21,044,518 bp
Band	9|9 A3	End	21,061,278 bp
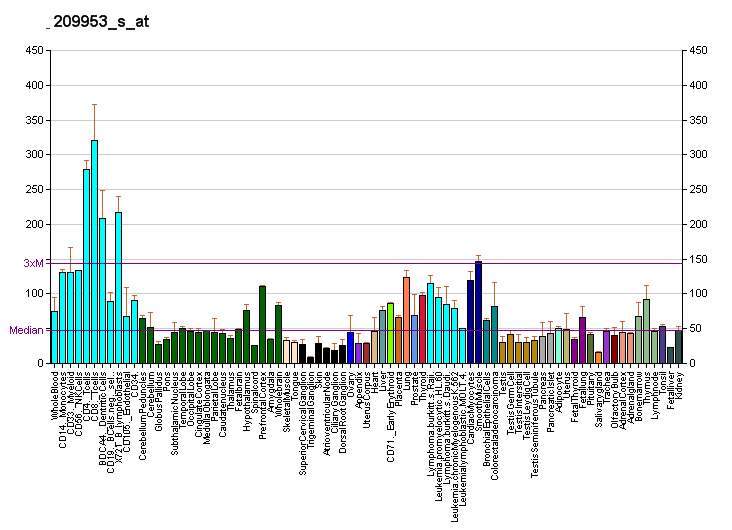
RNA expression pattern
Bgee	Human / Mouse (ortholog); Top expressed in: sural nerve; apex of heart; granulocyte; body of uterus; left uterine tube; upper lobe of left lung; left lobe of thyroid gland; gastric mucosa; right uterine tube; canal of the cervix / Top expressed in: maxillary prominence; mandibular prominence; right ventricle; neural layer of retina; somite; dentate gyrus of hippocampal formation granule cell; epiblast; abdominal wall; efferent ductule; neural tube; More reference expression data
BioGPS	More reference expression data
Gene ontology
Molecular function	unfolded protein binding; Hsp90 protein binding; kinase binding; chaperone binding; protein binding; protein kinase binding; heat shock protein binding; protein kinase regulator activity; protein tyrosine kinase activity; scaffold protein binding
Cellular component	extracellular exosome; HSP90-CDC37 chaperone complex; cytoplasm; cytosol; chaperone complex
Biological process	posttranscriptional regulation of gene expression; protein targeting; protein stabilization; regulation of cyclin-dependent protein serine/threonine kinase activity; regulation of type I interferon-mediated signaling pathway; regulation of interferon-gamma-mediated signaling pathway; positive regulation of mitophagy in response to mitochondrial depolarization; regulation of protein kinase activity; protein folding; peptidyl-tyrosine phosphorylation; ERBB2 signaling pathway
Sources:Amigo / QuickGO
Orthologs
Species	Human	Mouse
Entrez	11140	12539
Ensembl	ENSG00000105401	ENSMUSG00000019471
UniProt	Q16543	Q61081
RefSeq (mRNA)	NM_007065	NM_016742; NM_001378796
RefSeq (protein)	NP_008996	NP_058022; NP_001365725
Location (UCSC)	Chr 19: 10.39 – 10.42 Mb	Chr 9: 21.04 – 21.06 Mb
PubMed search
- Wikidata
View/Edit Human	View/Edit Mouse

Cdc37 N terminal kinase binding

Identifiers
- Symbol: CDC37_N
- Pfam: PF03234
- InterPro: IPR013855
- SCOP2: 1us7 / SCOPe / SUPFAM
Available protein structures:
- Pfam: structures / ECOD
- PDB: RCSB PDB; PDBe; PDBj
- PDBsum: structure summary

Cdc37 Hsp90 binding domain
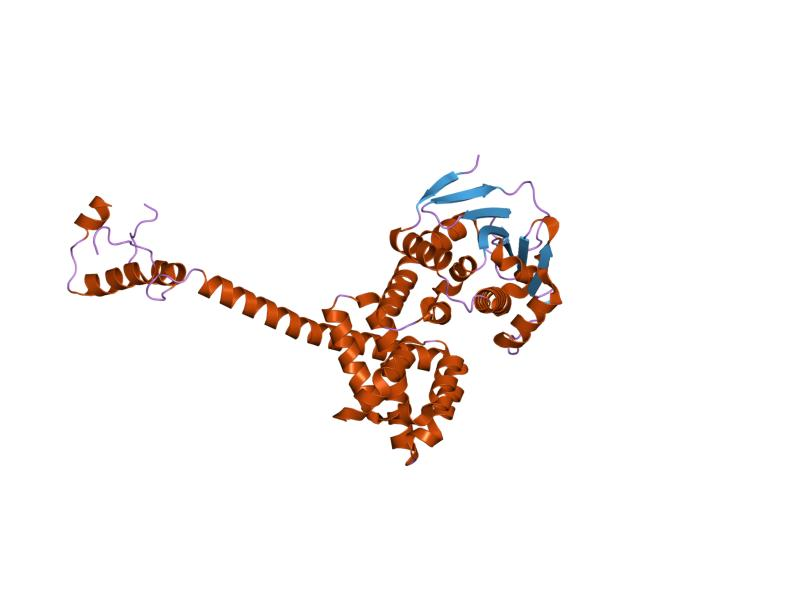
- complex of hsp90 and p50

Identifiers
- Symbol: CDC37_M
- Pfam: PF08565
- InterPro: IPR013874
- SCOP2: 1us7 / SCOPe / SUPFAM
Available protein structures:
- Pfam: structures / ECOD
- PDB: RCSB PDB; PDBe; PDBj
- PDBsum: structure summary

Cdc37 C terminal domain
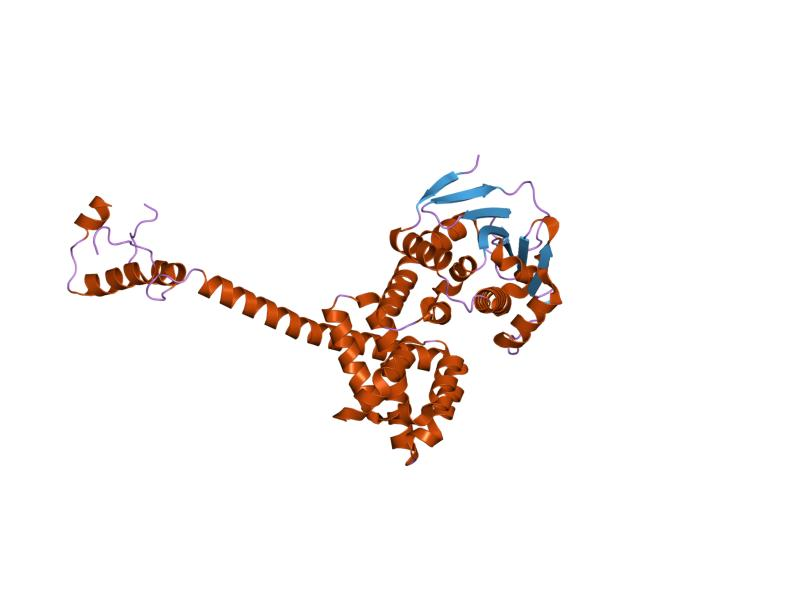
- complex of hsp90 and p50

Identifiers
- Symbol: CDC37_C
- Pfam: PF08564
- InterPro: IPR013873
- SCOP2: 1us7 / SCOPe / SUPFAM
Available protein structures:
- Pfam: structures / ECOD
- PDB: RCSB PDB; PDBe; PDBj
- PDBsum: structure summary

Hsp90 co-chaperone Cdc37 is a protein that in humans is encoded by the CDC37 gene. This protein is highly similar to Cdc 37, a cell division cycle control protein of Saccharomyces cerevisiae. This protein is a HSP90 Co-chaperone with specific function in cell signal transduction. It has been shown to form complex with Hsp90 and a variety of protein kinases including CDK4, CDK6, SRC, RAF1, MOK, as well as eIF-2 alpha kinases. It is thought to play a critical role in directing Hsp90 to its target kinases.

== Interactions ==
CDC37 has been shown to interact with:

- CDK4,
- HSP90AA1
- IKBKG,
- IKK2, and
- STK11.

== Domain architecture ==
CDC37 consists of three structural domains. The N-terminal domain binds to protein kinases. The central domain is the Hsp90 chaperone (heat shock protein 90) binding domain. The function of the C-terminal domain is unclear.
