= GAK (protein) =

Protein-coding gene in the species Homo sapiens

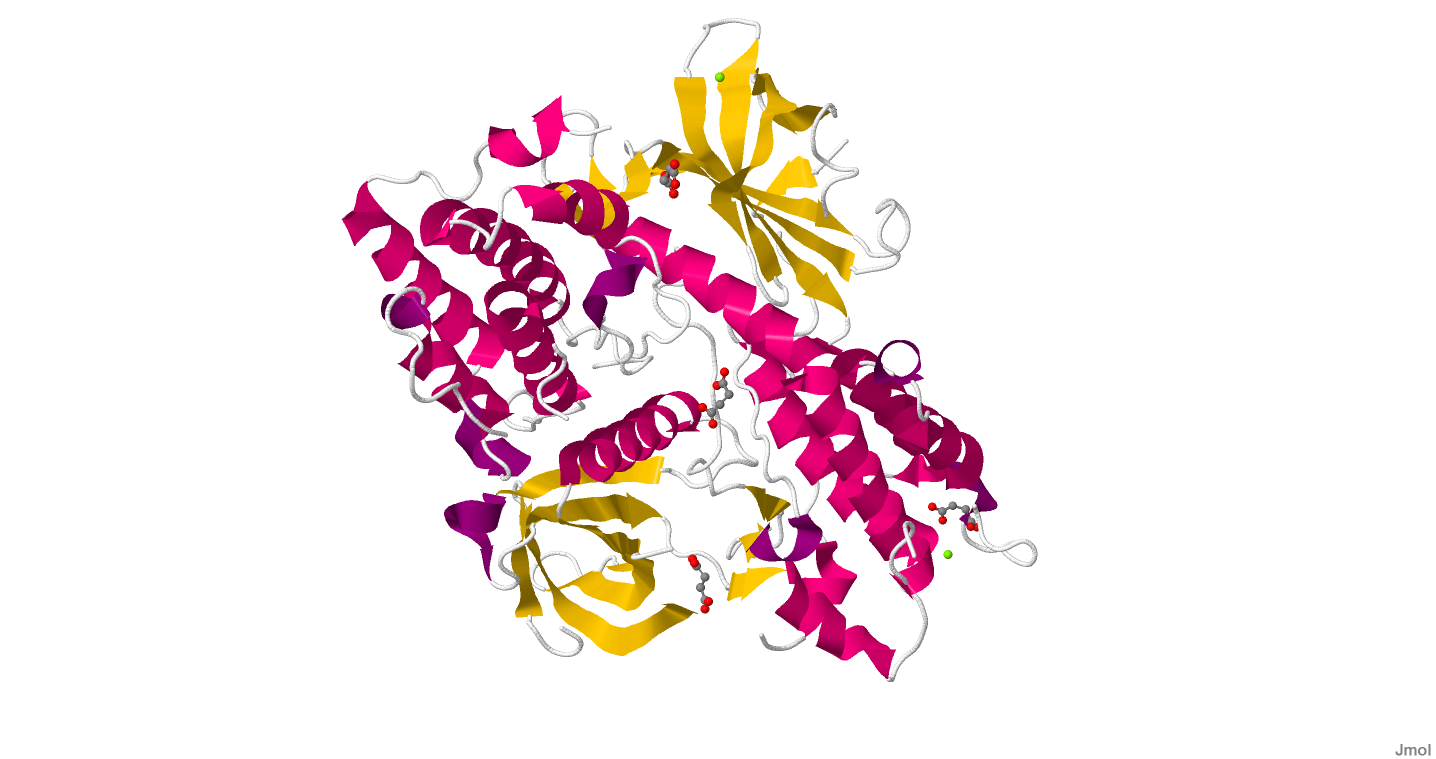

Identifiers
- Aliases: GAK, D130045N16Rik, DNAJ26, DNAJC26, cyclin G associated kinase
- External IDs: OMIM: 602052; MGI: 2442153; GeneCards: GAK
Available structures
PDB	Ortholog search: PDBe RCSB
PDB	List of PDB id codes 4C57, 4C58, 4C59, 4O38, 4Y8D
Enzyme activity
EC #	BRENDA	ExPASy	KEGG	MetaCyc
2.7.11.1	↗	↗	↗	↗

Gene location (Human)
Chr.	Chromosome 4 (human)
Band	4p16.3	Start	849,276 bp
Band	4p16.3	End	932,373 bp

Gene location (Mouse)
Chr.	Chromosome 5 (mouse)
Band	5|5 F	Start	108,717,277 bp
Band	5|5 F	End	108,777,621 bp
RNA expression pattern
Bgee	Human / Mouse (ortholog); Top expressed in: pancreatic ductal cell; endothelial cell; mucosa of transverse colon; granulocyte; right hemisphere of cerebellum; minor salivary glands; mucosa of ileum; left testis; body of stomach; right testis / Top expressed in: tail of embryo; genital tubercle; granulocyte; intestinal villus; dentate gyrus of hippocampal formation granule cell; crypt of lieberkuhn of small intestine; duodenum; epithelium of small intestine; thymus; lip; More reference expression data
BioGPS	n/a
Gene ontology
Molecular function	transferase activity; nucleotide binding; protein serine/threonine kinase activity; protein kinase activity; protein binding; ATP binding; kinase activity; cyclin binding; chaperone binding; clathrin binding
Cellular component	cytoplasm; perinuclear region of cytoplasm; vesicle; cell junction; Golgi apparatus; membrane; intracellular membrane-bounded organelle; focal adhesion; cytosol; synapse; presynapse
Biological process	protein phosphorylation; cell cycle; negative regulation of neuron projection development; Golgi organization; phosphorylation; clathrin-dependent endocytosis; clathrin coat disassembly; Golgi to lysosome transport; endoplasmic reticulum organization; synaptic vesicle uncoating; chaperone cofactor-dependent protein refolding; membrane organization; clathrin-coated pit assembly; receptor-mediated endocytosis; protein localization to plasma membrane; protein localization to Golgi apparatus
Sources:Amigo / QuickGO
Orthologs
Databases	NCBI: entry; OMA: entry
Species	Human	Mouse
Entrez	2580	231580
Ensembl	ENSG00000178950	ENSMUSG00000062234
UniProt	O14976	Q99KY4
RefSeq (mRNA)	NM_001286833; NM_005255; NM_001318134	NM_001282051; NM_001282052; NM_153569; NM_001359922; NM_001359923 NM_001359924
RefSeq (protein)	NP_001305063; NP_005246	NP_001268980; NP_001268981; NP_705797; NP_001346851; NP_001346852 NP_001346853
Location (UCSC)	Chr 4: 0.85 – 0.93 Mb	Chr 5: 108.72 – 108.78 Mb
PubMed search
- Wikidata
View/Edit Human	View/Edit Mouse

Cyclin G-associated kinase (GAK) is a serine/threonine kinase that in humans is encoded by the GAK gene.

== Function ==
In all eukaryotes, the cell cycle is governed by cyclin-dependent protein kinases (CDKs), whose activities are regulated by cyclins and CDK inhibitors in a diverse array of mechanisms that involve the control of phosphorylation and dephosphorylation of Ser, Thr or Tyr residues. Cyclins are molecules that possess a consensus domain called the 'cyclin box.' In mammalian cells, 9 cyclin species have been identified, and they are referred to as cyclins A through I. Cyclin G is a direct transcriptional target of the p53 tumor suppressor gene product and thus functions downstream of p53. GAK is an association partner of cyclin G and CDK5.

Cyclin G-associated kinase received its name because it immunoprecipitated with cyclin G though it now appears to not be associated with it. Cyclin G-associated kinase is homologous in function to the protein auxilin which when in association with Hsc70 uncoats clathrin in neuronal cells. However, the location of Cyclin G-associated kinase is not in the brain but near the trans-Golgi network of non-neuronal cells such as those found in the liver and testes. GAK is also known to be associated with focal adhesions though the exact relationship between the two is unknown.

== Structure ==
A structure of GAK was determined using X-ray diffraction to a resolution of 2.10 Å.

Cyclin G-associated kinase is a two domain cystolic protein. The domain of interest is the C-terminal domain which consists of three subdomains such as a C-terminal J domain, a clathrin-binding domain, and a tension-like N-terminal domain. The other domain is the N terminal kinase domain which is a functional Ser/Thr protein kinase. The N-terminal kinase domain is able to phosphorylate histone H1. The subdomain tension-like N terminal function has not yet determined, though the domain shares high homology to the tumor suppressant PTEN. The key characteristic is the cysteine group which is required for phosphorylation; however the tension-like N terminal subdomain is absent of some important functional residues that PTEN has. The C-terminal J domain is responsible for the interaction with Hsc70, which is a molecular chaperone responsible for the uncoating of clathrin-coated vesicles during endocytosis. The clathrin-binding domain gathers clathrin into baskets. At pH 7 GAK allows Hsc70 to uncoat clathrin baskets and at pH 6 Hsc70 binds clathrin baskets without uncoating clathrin. Without taking into account GAK’s kinase domain, GAK is 43% identical to auxilin, a neuronal cell uncoating clathrin cofactor, in its amino acid composition. GAK is 57% homologous to auxilin if conserved residues are included in the comparison. Though similar domains of these two molecules suggest and have similar functions, the proteins carry these functions out in different manners. GAK initiates the assembly of clathrin baskets stoichiometrically, but at the different pHs it will either bind the Hsc70 to the baskets or induce the Hsc70 to uncoat the clathrin baskets catalytically which is one difference between auxilin and GAK. This catalytic route explains why less GAK than auxilin is needed to carry out a similar function.
