= HSP90AA2 =

heat shock protein 90kDa alpha (cytosolic), class A member 2

Identifiers
- Symbol: HSP90AA2
- Alt. symbols: HSPCAL3
- NCBI gene: 3324
- HGNC: 5256
- OMIM: 140575
- RefSeq: NM_001040141
- UniProt: Q14568

Other data
- Locus: Chr. 11 p14.2-14.1
Search for
- Structures: Swiss-model
- Domains: InterPro

Heat shock protein 90kDa alpha (cytosolic), class A member 2, also known as HSP90AA2, is a human gene. The protein encoded by this gene belongs to the Hsp90 family of heat shock proteins.
