= Derris robusta =

Scientific classification
- Kingdom: Plantae
- Clade: Tracheophytes
- Clade: Angiosperms
- Clade: Eudicots
- Clade: Rosids
- Order: Fabales
- Family: Fabaceae
- Subfamily: Faboideae
- Genus: Derris
- Species: D. robusta

Binomial name
- Derris robusta (Roxb. ex DC.) Benth.

Synonyms
- Dalbergia robusta Roxb. ex DC.

Species of legume

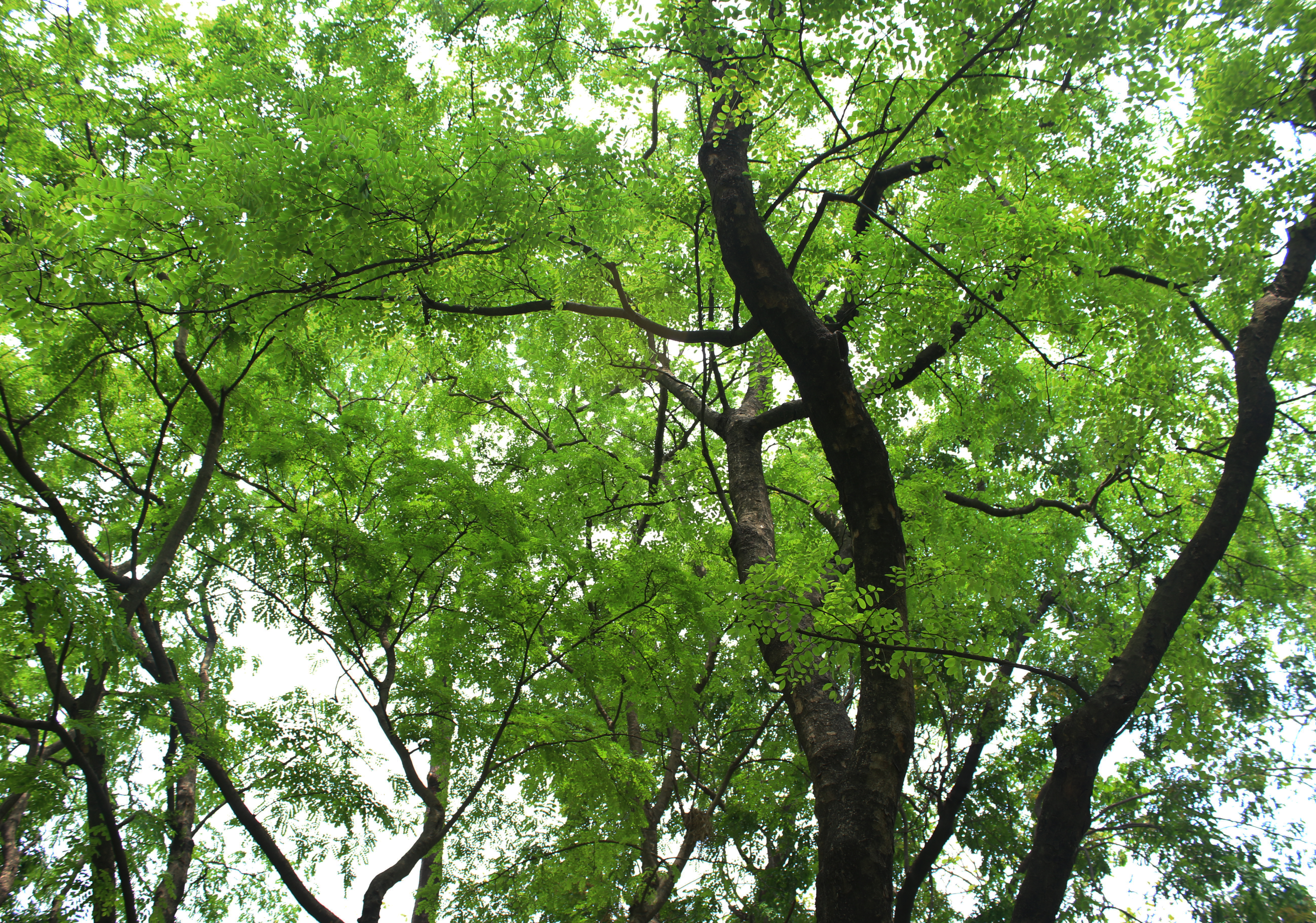
Derris robusta in the National Botanical Garden of Bangladesh

Derris robusta is a tree species in the genus Derris found in India.

Derrubone is an isoflavone, a type of flavonoid, originally isolated from D. robusta.
