= Macbecin =

Macbecins
- Macbecin I

- Macbecin II

Names
- IUPAC names I: (4E,6Z,8S,10E,12R,13S,14R,16S,17R)-13,14,17-trimethoxy-4,8,10,12,16-pentamethyl-3,20,22-trioxo-2-azabicyclo[16.3.1]docosa-1(21),4,6,10,18-pentaen-9-yl carbamate II: (4E,6Z,8S,10E,12R,13S,14R,16S,17R)-20,22-dihydroxy-13,14,17-trimethoxy-4,8,10,12,16-pentamethyl-3-oxo-2-azabicyclo[16.3.1]docosa-1(22),4,6,10,18,20-hexaen-9-yl carbamate

Identifiers
CAS Number	I: 73341-72-7; II: 73341-73-8
3D model (JSmol)	I: Interactive image; II: Interactive image
ChemSpider	I: 65321675; II: 129561980
PubChem CID	I: 5458728; II: 5458729
UNII	GB3Z258LF8
- InChI: I: InChI=1S/C30H42N2O8/c1-16-10-9-11-17(2)29(35)32-23-15-21(33)14-22(25(23)34)27(38-7)20(5)13-24(37-6)28(39-8)19(4)12-18(3)26(16)40-30(31)36/h9-12,14-16,19-20,24,26-28H,13H2,1-8H3,(H2,31,36)(H,32,35)/b10-9-,17-11+,18-12+/t16-,19+,20-,24+,26?,27+,28-/m0/s1 Key: PLTGBUPHJAKFMA-OEPVMNMSSA-N; II: InChI=1S/C30H44N2O8/c1-16-10-9-11-17(2)29(35)32-23-15-21(33)14-22(25(23)34)27(38-7)20(5)13-24(37-6)28(39-8)19(4)12-18(3)26(16)40-30(31)36/h9-12,14-16,19-20,24,26-28,33-34H,13H2,1-8H3,(H2,31,36)(H,32,35)/b10-9-,17-11+,18-12+/t16-,19+,20-,24+,26?,27+,28-/m0/s1 Key: SVSFCSOFEPJFSF-OEPVMNMSSA-N
- SMILES: I: C[C@H]1C[C@H]([C@H]([C@@H](/C=C(/C([C@H](/C=C\C=C(\C(=O)NC2=CC(=O)C=C([C@@H]1OC)C2=O)/C)C)OC(=O)N)\C)C)OC)OC; II: C[C@H]1C[C@H]([C@H]([C@@H](/C=C(/C([C@H](/C=C\C=C(\C(=O)NC2=CC(=CC(=C2O)[C@@H]1OC)O)/C)C)OC(=O)N)\C)C)OC)OC

Properties
Chemical formula	I: C_{30}H_{42}N_{2}O_{8} II: C_{30}H_{44}N_{2}O_{8}
Molar mass	I: 558.66 g/mol II: 560.68 g/mol
- Except where otherwise noted, data are given for materials in their standard state (at 25 °C [77 °F], 100 kPa). verify (what is ?) Infobox references

Macbecins are a pair of chemical compounds in the ansamycin family of antibiotics. They are designated macbecin I and macbecin II and they were first isolated from actinomycete bacteria. Macbecin possesses antitumor properties. In vitro studies have shown that macbecins are effective in the eradication of Gram-positive bacteria, fungi, and protozoa including Tetrahymena pyriformis.

== Structure ==
Macbecins have an unusual macrocyclic lactam structure. The two variants, macbecin I and II, correspond to the oxidized 1,4-benzoquinone and reduced hydroquinone, respectively.

== Mechanism of action ==
Macbecins mechanism of action is in part due to heat shock protein Hsp90 protein inhibition.
