= Hsp90 =

Heat shock proteins with a molecular mass around 90kDa

Histidine kinase-, DNA gyrase B-, and HSP90-like ATPase
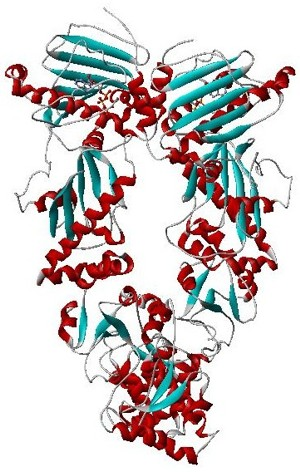
- Solid ribbon model of the yeast Hsp90-dimer (α-helices = red, β-sheets = cyan, loops = grey) in complex with ATP (red stick diagram).

Identifiers
- Symbol: HATPase_c
- Pfam: PF02518
- Pfam clan: CL0025
- InterPro: IPR003594
- SMART: SM00387
- SCOP2: 1ei1 / SCOPe / SUPFAM
Available protein structures:
- PDB: IPR003594 PF02518 (ECOD; PDBsum)
- AlphaFold: IPR003594; PF02518

Hsp90 protein
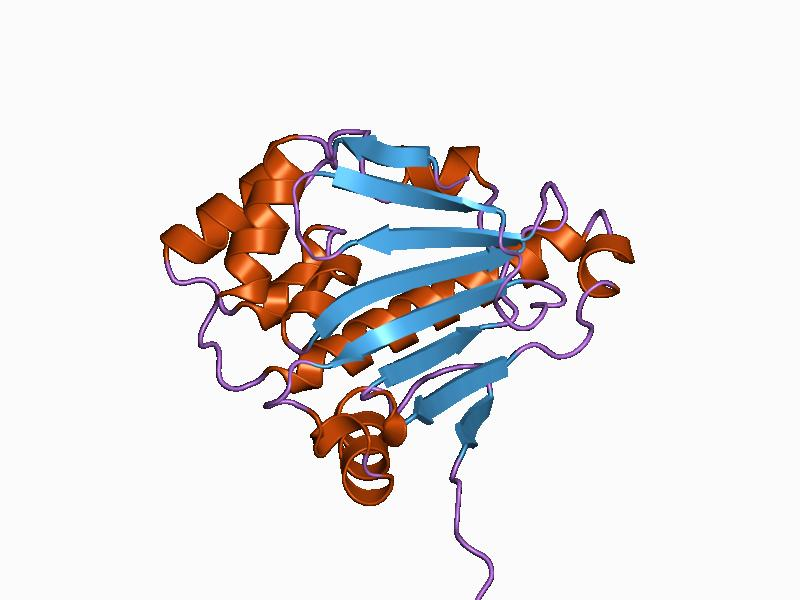
- Structure of the N-terminal domain of the yeast Hsp90 chaperone.

Identifiers
- Symbol: Hsp90
- Pfam: PF00183
- InterPro: IPR020576
- PROSITE: PDOC00270
- SCOP2: 1ah6 / SCOPe / SUPFAM
Available protein structures:
- PDB: IPR020576 PF00183 (ECOD; PDBsum)
- AlphaFold: IPR020576; PF00183

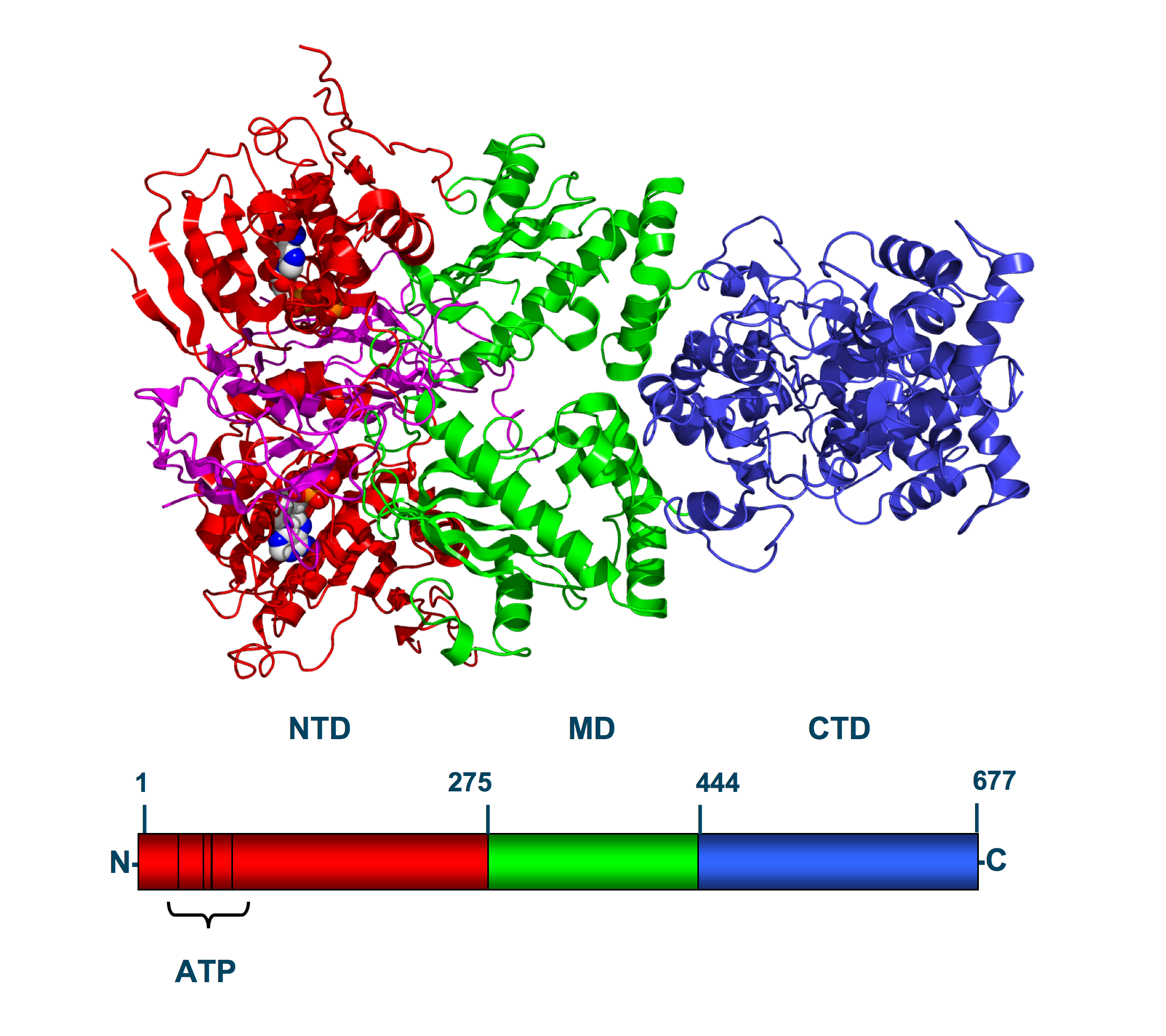
Domain structure of the yeast heat-inducible Hsp90. Top: Crystallographic structure of the dimeric Hsp90. Bound ATP molecules are represented by space filling spheres. Bottom: 1D sequence of the yeast Hsp90. NTD= N-terminal domain (red), MD = middle domain (green), CTD = C-terminal domain (blue).

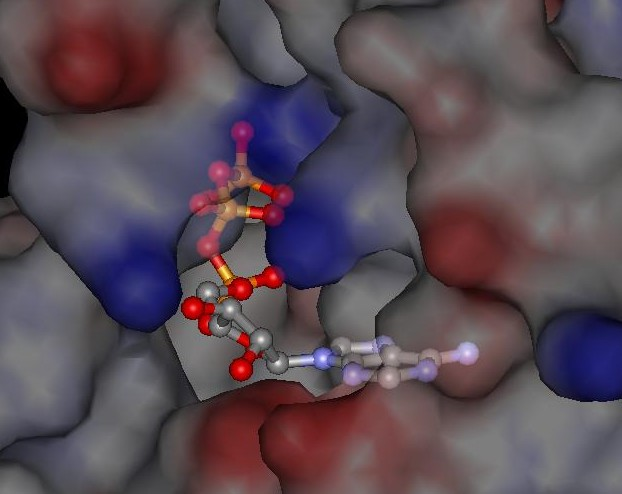
Crystallographic structure of the ATP binding pocket of Hsp90 where ATP is represented by a ball and stick figure (carbon atoms = grey, nitrogen = blue, oxygen = red, phosphorus = orange) and Hsp90 is depicted as a solid surface (negatively charged = red, positively charged = blue, electrostatically neutral = grey).

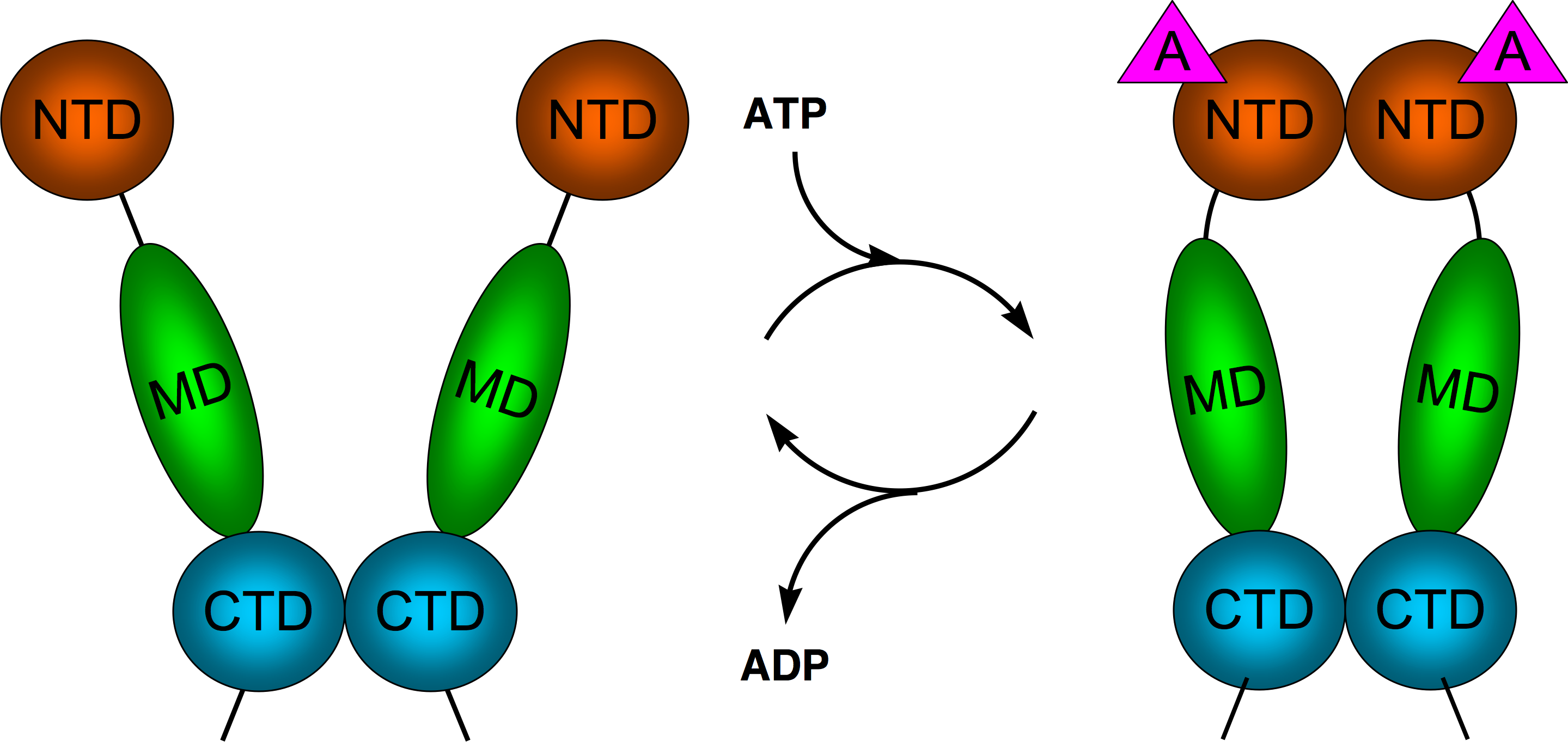
Pincer movement of Hsp90 coupled to the ATPase cycle. NTD = N-terminal domain, MD = middle domain, CTD = C-terminal domain.

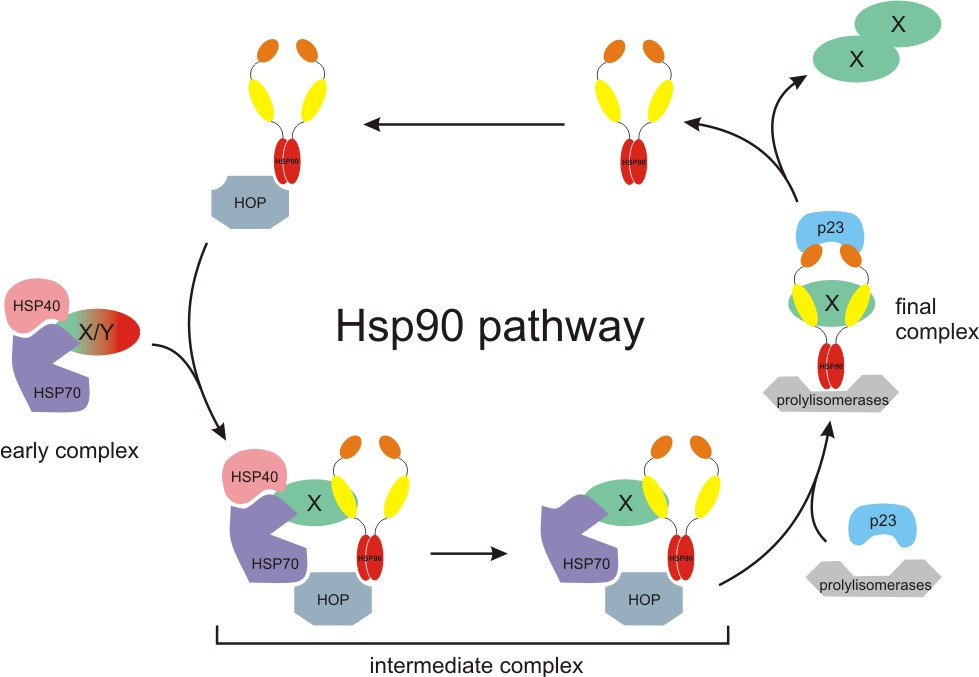
The Hsp90 chaperone cycle. X/Y represents an immature incompletely folded protein such a steroid receptor. Hsp40, Hsp70, and p23 are partner chaperones while Hop is a co-chaperone. Also, X-X represents a mature properly folded protein dimer.

Hsp90 (heat shock protein 90) is a chaperone protein that assists other proteins to fold properly, stabilizes proteins against heat stress, and aids in protein degradation. It also stabilizes a number of proteins required for tumor growth, which is why Hsp90 inhibitors are investigated as anti-cancer drugs.

Heat shock proteins, as a class, are among the most highly expressed cellular proteins across all species. As their name implies, heat shock proteins protect cells when stressed by elevated temperatures. They account for 1–2% of total protein in unstressed cells. However, when cells are heated, the fraction of heat shock proteins increases to 4–6% of cellular proteins.

Heat shock protein 90 (Hsp90) is one of the most common of the heat-related proteins. The "90" comes from the fact that it has a mass of roughly 90 kilodaltons. A 90 kDa protein is considered fairly large for a non-fibrous protein. Hsp90 is found in bacteria and all branches of eukarya, but it is apparently absent in archaea. Whereas cytoplasmic Hsp90 is essential for viability under all conditions in eukaryotes, the bacterial homologue HtpG is dispensable under non-heat stress conditions.

This protein was first isolated by extracting proteins from cells stressed by heating, dehydrating or by other means, all of which caused the cell's proteins to begin to denature. However it was later discovered that Hsp90 also has essential functions in unstressed cells.

== Isoforms ==
Hsp90 is highly conserved and expressed in a variety of different organisms from bacteria to mammals – including the prokaryotic analogue HtpG (high-temperature protein G) with 40% sequence identity and 55% similarity to the human protein. Yeast Hsp90 is 60% identical to human Hsp90α.

In mammalian cells, there are two or more genes encoding cytosolic Hsp90 homologues, with the human Hsp90α showing 85% sequence identity to Hsp90β. The α- and the β-forms are thought to be the result of a gene duplication event that occurred millions of years ago.

The five functional human genes encoding Hsp90 protein isoforms are listed below:

| family | subcellular location | subfamily | gene | protein |
|---|---|---|---|---|
| HSP90A | cytosolic | HSP90AA (inducible) | HSP90AA1 | Hsp90-α_{1} |
| HSP90A | cytosolic | HSP90AA (inducible) | HSP90AA2 | Hsp90-α_{2} |
| HSP90A | cytosolic | HSP90AB (constitutively expressed) | HSP90AB1 | Hsp90-β |
| HSP90B | endoplasmic reticulum | | HSP90B1 | Endoplasmin/ GRP-94 |
| TRAP | mitochondrial | | TRAP1 | TNF Receptor- Associated Protein 1 |

There are 12 human pseudogenes (non-functional genes) that encode additional Hsp90 isoforms that are not expressed as proteins.

A membrane-associated variant of cytosolic Hsp90, lacking an ATP-binding site, has recently been identified and was named Hsp90N. This HSP90α-Δ-N transcript is a chimera, with the first 105 bp of the coding sequence derived from the CD47 gene on chromosome 3q13.2, and the remaining coding sequence derived from HSP90AA1. However, gene-encoding Hsp90N was later proven to be non-existent in human genome. It is possibly a cloning artifact or a product of chromosomal rearrangement occurring in a single cell line.

== Structure ==
=== Common features ===
The overall structure of Hsp90 is similar to that of other proteins in that it contains all of the common secondary structural elements (i.e., alpha helixes, beta pleated sheets, and random coils). Being a cytoplasmic protein requires that the protein be globular in structure, that is largely non-polar on the inside and polar on the outside, so as to be solubilized by water. Hsp90 contains nine helices and eight anti-parallel beta pleated sheets, which combine to form several alpha/beta sandwiches. The 3_{10} helices make up approximately 11% of the protein's amino acid residues, which is much higher than the average 4% in other proteins.

=== Domain structure ===
Hsp90 consists of four structural domains:

- a highly conserved N-terminal domain (NTD) of ~25 kDa
- a "charged linker" region, that connects the N-terminus with the middle domain
- a middle domain (MD) of ~40 kDa
- a C-terminal domain (CTD) of ~12 kDa.

Crystal structures are available for the N-terminal domain of yeast and human Hsp90, for complexes of the N-terminus with inhibitors and nucleotides, and for the middle domain of yeast Hsp90. Recently structures for full length Hsp90 from E. coli (2IOP, 2IOQ), yeast (2CG9, 2CGE), and the dog endoplasmic reticulum (2O1U, 2O1V) were elucidated.

Hsp90 forms homodimers where the contact sites are localized within the C-terminus in the open conformation of the dimer. The N-termini also come in contact in the closed conformation of the dimer.

==== N-terminal domain ====
The N-terminal domain shows homology not only among members of the Hsp90 chaperone family but also to members of the ATPase/kinase GHKL (Gyrase, Hsp90, Histidine Kinase, MutL) superfamily.

A common binding pocket for ATP and the inhibitor geldanamycin is situated in the N-terminal domain. Amino acids that are directly involved in the interaction with ATP are Leu34, Asn37, Asp79, Asn92, Lys98, Gly121, and Phe124. In addition, Mg^{2+} and several water molecules form bridging electrostatic and hydrogen bonding interactions, respectively, between Hsp90 and ATP. In addition, Glu33 is required for ATP hydrolysis.

==== Middle domain ====
The middle domain is divided into three regions:

- a 3-layer α-β-α sandwich
- a 3-turn α-helix and irregular loops
- a 6-turn α-helix.

The MD is also involved in client protein binding. For example, proteins known to interact this the Hsp90 MD include PKB/Akt1, eNOS, Aha1, Hch1. Furthermore, substrate binding (e.g., by Aha1 and Hch1) to the MD is also known to increase the ATPase activity of Hsp90.

==== C-terminal domain ====
The C-terminal domain possesses an alternative ATP-binding site, which becomes accessible when the N-terminal Bergerat pocket is occupied.

At the very C-terminal end of the protein is the tetratricopeptide repeat (TPR) motif recognition site, the conserved MEEVD pentapeptide, that is responsible for the interaction with co-factors such as the immunophilins FKBP51 and FKBP52, the stress induced phosphoprotein 1 (Sti1/Hop), cyclophilin-40, PP5, Tom70, and many more.

== Mechanism ==
The Hsp90 protein contains three functional domains, the ATP-binding, protein-binding, and dimerizing domain, each of which playing a crucial role in the function of the protein.

=== ATP binding ===
The region of the protein near the N-terminus has a high-affinity ATP-binding site. The ATP binds to a sizable cleft in the side of protein, which is 15 Å (1.5 nanometres) deep. This cleft has a high affinity for ATP, and when given a suitable protein substrate, Hsp90 cleaves the ATP into ADP and P_{i}. Direct inhibitors of ATP binding or allosteric inhibitors of either ATP binding or ATPase activity can block Hsp90 function. Another interesting feature of the ATP-binding region of Hsp90 is that it has a "lid" that is open during the ADP-bound state and closed in the ATP-bound state. In the open conformation, the lid has no intraprotein interaction, and when closed comes into contact with several residues. The contribution of this lid to the activity of Hsp90 has been probed with site-directed mutagenesis. The Ala107Asp mutant stabilizing the closed conformation of the protein through the formation of additional hydrogen bonds substantially increases ATPase activity while leaving the AMP+PnP conformation unchanged.

The ATPase-binding region of Hsp90 is currently under intense study, because it is the principal binding site of drugs targeting this protein. Antitumor drugs targeting this section of Hsp90 include the antibiotics geldanamycin, herbimycin, radicicol, deguelin, derrubone, macbecin, and beta-lactams.

=== Protein binding ===
The protein-binding region of Hsp90 is located toward the C-terminus of the amino sequence. The Hsp90 protein can adopt two major conformational states. The first is an open ATP-bound state and the second is a closed ADP-bound state. Thus, ATP hydrolysis drives what is commonly referred to as a "pincer-type" conformational change in the protein binding site.

Hsp90, while in the open conformation, leaves some hydrophobic residues exposed, to which unfolded and misfolded proteins that have unusual hydrophobic regions exposed are recruited with high affinity. When a bound substrate is in place, the energy-releasing ATP hydrolysis by the ATPase function near the N-terminal domain forces conformational changes that clamp the Hsp90 down onto the substrate. In a reaction similar to that of other molecular clamp proteins like GyrB and MutL, this site drives virtually all of the protein folding functions that Hsp90 plays a role in. In contrast, MutL and GyrB function as topoisomerases and use a charge clamp with a high amount of positively charged sidechains that is electrostatically attracted to the negative backbone of DNA.

The ability of Hsp90 to clamp onto proteins allows it to perform several functions including assisting folding, preventing aggregation, and facilitating transport.

== Function ==
=== Normal cells ===
In unstressed cells, Hsp90 plays a number of important roles, which include assisting folding, intracellular transport, maintenance, and degradation of proteins as well as facilitating cell signaling.

==== Protein folding and role as chaperone ====
Hsp90 is known to associate with the non-native structures of many proteins, which has led to the proposal that Hsp90 is involved in protein folding in general. Furthermore, Hsp90 has been shown to suppress the aggregation of a wide range of "client" or "substrate" proteins and hence acts as a general protective chaperone. However Hsp90 is somewhat more selective than other chaperones.

==== Protein degradation ====
Eukaryotic proteins that are no longer needed or are misfolded or otherwise damaged are usually marked for destruction by the polyubiquitation pathway. These ubiquitinated proteins are recognized and degraded by the 26S proteasome. Hence the 26S proteasome is an integral part of the cell's mechanism to degrade proteins. Furthermore, a constant supply of functional Hsp90 is needed to maintain the tertiary structure of the proteasome. Finally experiments done with heat sensitive Hsp90 mutants and the 26S proteasome suggest that Hsp90 is responsible for most, if not all, of the ATPase activity of the proteasome.

==== Interaction with steroid receptors ====
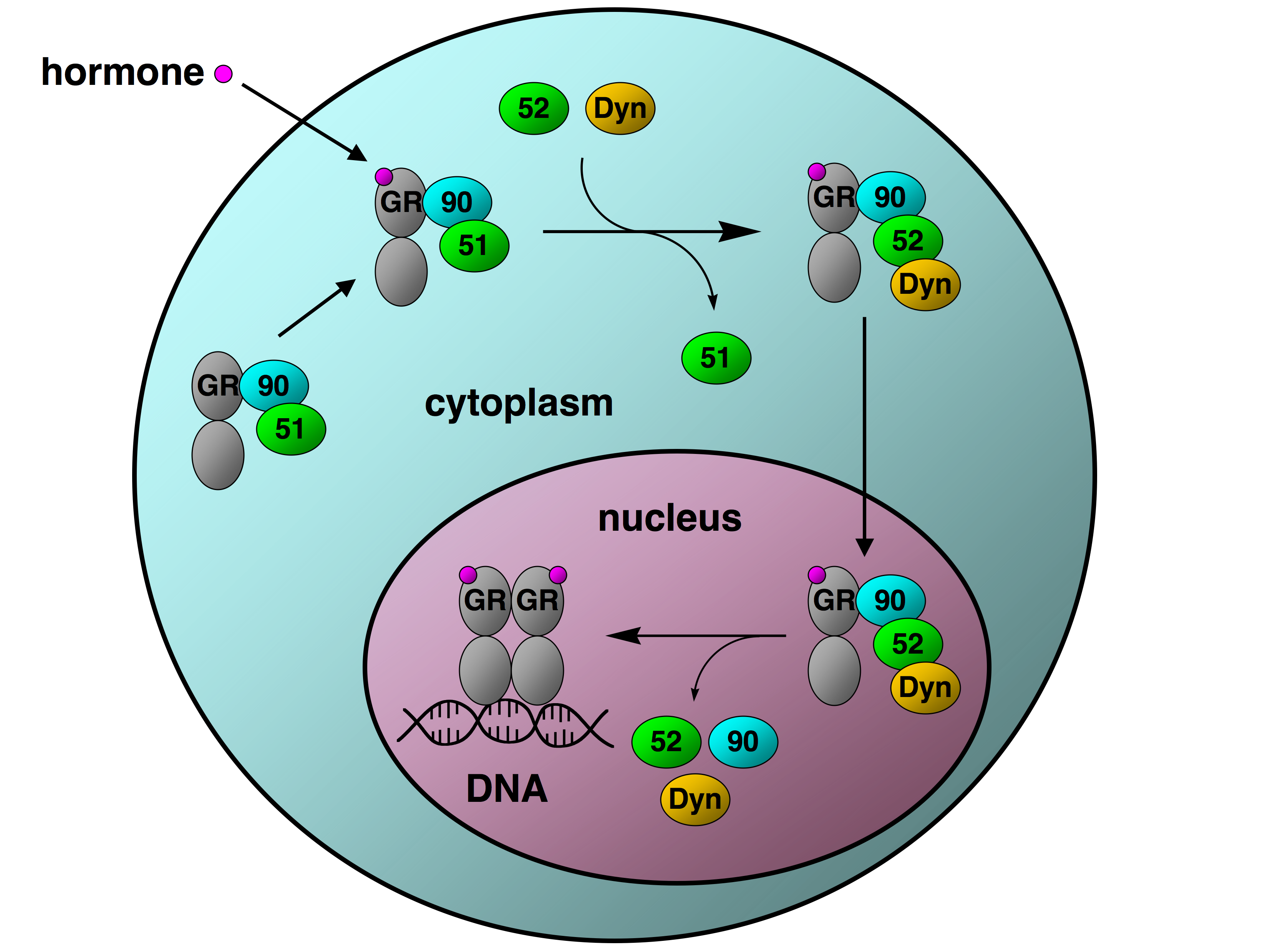
Schematic diagram of the translocation of the glucocorticoid receptor (GR) from the cytoplasm into the nucleus assisted by Hsp90 (90). In the cytoplasm, GR is complexed with Hsp90 and the immunophilin FKBP51 (51). Binding of hormone to GR causes a conformational change in the complex, which results in exchange of FKBP51 for FKBP52 (52). FKBP52 in turn binds the dynein (dyn) motor protein that attaches to the cytoskeleton and transports the GR complex into the nucleus. Once in the nucleus, the complex disassembles releasing GR, which dimerizes and binds to DNA where it facilitates transcription of DNA into mRNA.

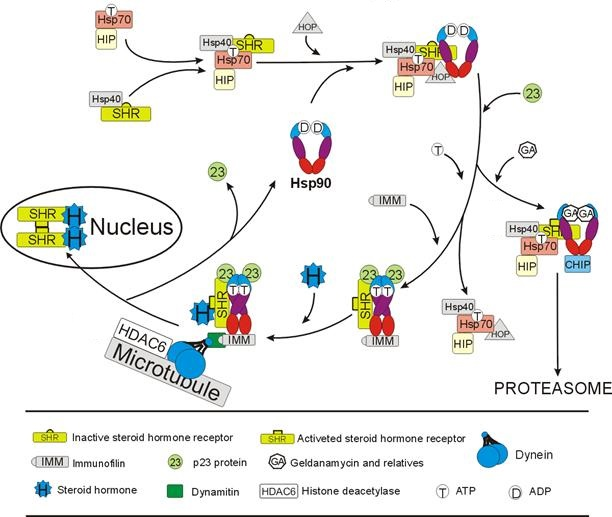
HSP90-dependent cycle of steroid hormone receptor (SHR) activation. The minimal complex for SHR activation include HSP40, HSP70, HOP (Hsp organizing protein), HSP90 and p23 protein. Just after translation the steroid hormone receptor binds to HSP40 and HSP70 (top, left). Next, HOP protein (composed from TPR domains) deliver it to HSP90. HOP mediates interaction between HSP70 and HSP90 through their C-terminal domains. This transfer takes place only if ADP is bound to HSP90. The exchange of ADP to ATP inside N-terminal pocket induces dissociation of HSP70 and its co-chaperones from the complex that associate then with p23 (via N-terminal side of HSP90 dimer) which prevents ATP hydrolysis, and immunophilins, which replaces HOP (right). At this point, if the chaperone binds geldanamycin, which mimics ADP binding, proteins p23 and HOP dissociate and CHIP, an E3 ubiquitin ligase, is attached to the complex and SHR receptor is being degraded through the proteasome-mediateted pathway (bottom, right). Immunophilins, FKBP51 and FKBP52, are responsible for transportation of HSP90-SHR-ligand complexes along the microtubule fibers (additionally, dynamitin and dynein, the microtubule-associated proteins are involved in this process). Therefore, a translocation of hormones, p53 and probably other HSP90 substrate proteins within cytoplasm is fast and tightly controlled. ATP hydrolysis inside HSP90 nucleotide-binding pocket leads to the dissociation of the complex. Next, steroid hormone receptors dimerize and are translocated to the nucleus (bottom, left). Subsequently, SHR-hormone complexes bind to particular DNA sequences in the promoters of hormone-responsive genes to control their transcription. It should be stressed, that the movement of SHRs inside the nucleus is also HSP90- and ATP-dependent. But it is not known whether HSP90-HSP70-SHR complexes can be transmitted through the nuclear envelope pores as a whole or could shuttle between separate HSP90 molecular complexes on both sides of the nuclear envelope

The glucocorticoid receptor (GR) is the most thoroughly studied example of a steroid receptor whose function is crucially dependent on interactions with Hsp90. In the absence of the steroid hormone cortisol, GR resides in the cytosol complexed with several chaperone proteins including Hsp90 (see figure to the right). These chaperones maintain the GR in a state capable of binding hormone. A second role of Hsp90 is to bind immunophilins (e.g., FKBP52) that attach the GR complex to the dynein protein trafficking pathway, which translocates the activated receptor from the cytoplasm into the nucleus. Once in the nucleus, the GR dimerizes and binds to specific sequences of DNA and thereby upregulates the expression of GR responsive genes. Hsp90 is also required for the proper functioning of several other steroid receptors, including those responsible for the binding of aldosterone, androgen, estrogen, and progesterone.

=== Cancerous cells ===
Cancerous cells overexpress a number of proteins, including growth factor receptors, such as EGFR, or signal transduction proteins such as PI3K and AKT (Inhibition of these proteins may trigger apoptosis). Hsp90 stabilizes various growth factor receptors and some signaling molecules including PI3K and AKT proteins. Hence inhibition of Hsp90 downregulates the PI3K/AKT pathway leading to downregulation of the anti-apoptotic protein Bcl-w resulting in apoptosis of cancerous and senescent cells.

Interestingly, the disruption of HSP90 with nano-therapeutics has been implicated in targeting drug-induced resistance and relieves the suppression of Natural Killer (NK) immune cells in breast cancer. Another important role of Hsp90 in cancer is the stabilization of mutant proteins such as v-Src, the fusion oncogene Bcr/Abl, and mutant forms of p53 that appear during cell transformation. It appears that Hsp90 can act as a "protector" of less stable proteins produced by DNA mutations.

Hsp90 is also required for induction of vascular endothelial growth factor (VEGF) and nitric oxide synthase (NOS). Both are important for de novo angiogenesis that is required for tumour growth beyond the limit of diffusion distance of oxygen in tissues. It also promotes the invasion step of metastasis by assisting the matrix metalloproteinase MMP2. Together with its co-chaperones, Hsp90 modulates tumour cell apoptosis "mediated through effects on AKT, tumor necrosis factor receptors (TNFR) and nuclear factor-κB (NF-κB) function.". Also, Hsp90 participates in many key processes in oncogenesis such as self-sufficiency in growth signals, stabilization of mutant proteins, angiogenesis, and metastasis.

== Clinical significance ==
Hsp90 plays apparently conflicting roles in the cell, as it is essential for both the creation and the maintenance as well as the destruction of proteins. Its normal function is critical to maintaining the health of cells, whereas its dysregulation may contribute to carcinogenesis. The ability of this chaperone to both stabilize the 26S proteasome (which enables the cell to degrade unwanted and/or harmful proteins) and to stabilize kinases against the same proteasome demonstrates its functional diversity. The uses of Hsp90 inhibitors in cancer treatment highlight Hsp90's importance as a therapeutic target.

Targeting Hsp90 with drugs has shown promising effects in clinical trials. For example, the Hsp90 inhibitor geldanamycin has been used as an anti-tumor agent. The drug was originally thought to function as a kinase inhibitor but was subsequently shown to be an Hsp90 inhibitor where it uses a compact conformation to insert itself into the ATP binding site.

HSP90 beta has been identified as one of the autoantigenic biomarkers and targets involved in human ovarian autoimmune disease leading to ovarian failure and thereby infertility.

Prediction and validation of the immunodominant epitope/s of HSP90 beta protein has been demonstrated using sera from infertile women having anti-HSP90 autoantibodies. The decapeptide EP6 (380-389)is a major immunogenic epitope of HSP90 followed by EP1 (1-12) and EP8 (488-498). Knowledge of binding epitopes on the autoantigen is necessary to understand the subsequent pathologic events. Predicted 3D structures of these peptides demonstrated that they exist in the loop conformation, which is the most mobile part of the protein. Also, analysis of the sequences of HSP90 beta across several species reveals that EP6 peptide forms a part of a well-conserved motif. A polyclonal antibody generated to the immunodominant epitope- EP6 confirms similar biochemical and cellular immunoreactivity as seen with the patients' sera with anti-HSP90 autoantibodies. The study might generate new tools for the detection of disease-inducing epitopes and a possible therapeutic intervention.

== Evolution ==
Sequence alignments of Hsp90 have shown the protein to have about 40% sequence identity across all homologs, indicating that it is a highly conserved protein. There are two homologs, found in the cytosol and endoplasmic reticulum respectively. The presence of these two homologs was likely caused by a gene duplication event very early in the evolution of eukaryotes that may have accompanied the evolution of the endoplasmic reticulum or the nucleus. This inference is supported by the fact that the duplication is found in Giardia lamblia, one of the earliest branching eukaryotic species. At least 2 other subsequent gene duplications occurred, which explains the different forms of Hsp90 found in fungi and vertebrates. One divergence produced cognate and heat-induced forms of Hsp90 in Saccharomyces cerevisiae, while the second gene duplication event in the cytosolic branch produced the alpha and beta subfamilies of sequences that are found in all vertebrates. In a phylogenetic tree based on Hsp90 sequences, it was found that plants and animals are more closely related to each other than to fungi. Similar to the Hsp90 protein, the gene for Hsp70 protein also underwent duplication at a very early stage in the formation of eukaryotic cells and the homologs in the cytosol and endoplasmic reticulum resulted from this gene duplication event. These gene duplication events are important in terms of the origin of the eukaryotic cell and of the endoplasmic reticulum.

== See also ==
- Evolutionary capacitance
- Hsp90 cis-regulatory element
