= Derrubone =

Names
- IUPAC name 5,7-Dihydroxy-6-(3-methylbut-2-en-1-yl)-3′,4′-[methylenebis(oxy)]isoflavone
- Systematic IUPAC name 3-(2H-1,3-Benzodioxol-5-yl)-5,7-dihydroxy-6-(3-methylbut-2-en-1-yl)-4H-1-benzopyran-4-one
- Other names 5,7-Dihydroxy-3',4'-methylenedioxy-6-prenylisoflavone

Identifiers
CAS Number	22044-58-2
3D model (JSmol)	Interactive image
ChEMBL	ChEMBL412010
ChemSpider	4709237
PubChem CID	5810067
UNII	EVN8G9T8C6
CompTox Dashboard (EPA)	DTXSID601027239
- InChI: InChI=1S/C21H18O6/c1-11(2)3-5-13-15(22)8-18-19(20(13)23)21(24)14(9-25-18)12-4-6-16-17(7-12)27-10-26-16/h3-4,6-9,22-23H,5,10H2,1-2H3 Key: FTBGFGQPUMCUSC-UHFFFAOYSA-N; InChI=1/C21H18O6/c1-11(2)3-5-13-15(22)8-18-19(20(13)23)21(24)14(9-25-18)12-4-6-16-17(7-12)27-10-26-16/h3-4,6-9,22-23H,5,10H2,1-2H3 Key: FTBGFGQPUMCUSC-UHFFFAOYAI
- SMILES: CC(=CCC1=C(C=C2C(=C1O)C(=O)C(=CO2)C3=CC4=C(C=C3)OCO4)O)C

Properties
Chemical formula	C_{21}H_{18}O_{6}
Molar mass	366.369 g·mol^{−1}
- Except where otherwise noted, data are given for materials in their standard state (at 25 °C [77 °F], 100 kPa). verify (what is ?) Infobox references

Derrubone is a prenylated isoflavone, a type of flavonoid. It was originally isolated from the Indian tree Derris robusta. Recent research indicates that it acts as an inhibitor of Hsp90 to its function as a chaperone protein.
