= ST13 =

Identifiers
- Aliases: ST13, AAG2, FAM10A1, FAM10A4, HIP, HOP, HSPABP, HSPABP1, P48, PRO0786, SNC6, ST13 Hsp70 interacting protein
- External IDs: OMIM: 606796; MGI: 1917606; GeneCards: ST13
Available structures
PDB	Ortholog search: PDBe RCSB
PDB	List of PDB id codes 1UZS

Gene location (Human)
Chr.	Chromosome 22 (human)
Band	22q13.2	Start	40,824,535 bp
Band	22q13.2	End	40,856,639 bp

Gene location (Mouse)
Chr.	Chromosome 15 (mouse)
Band	15|15 E1	Start	81,247,870 bp
Band	15|15 E1	End	81,284,278 bp
RNA expression pattern
Bgee	Human / Mouse (ortholog); Top expressed in: left ovary; Achilles tendon; right ovary; epithelium of colon; ganglionic eminence; body of uterus; ventricular zone; stromal cell of endometrium; canal of the cervix; gallbladder / Top expressed in: pineal gland; tail of embryo; neural layer of retina; retinal pigment epithelium; yolk sac; genital tubercle; ventricular zone; abdominal wall; epiblast; dentate gyrus of hippocampal formation granule cell; More reference expression data
BioGPS	n/a
Gene ontology
Molecular function	dATP binding; unfolded protein binding; protein-containing complex binding; Hsp70 protein binding; protein-macromolecule adaptor activity; chaperone binding; protein binding; protein domain specific binding; identical protein binding; protein dimerization activity
Cellular component	extracellular exosome; cytoplasm; cytosol; protein-containing complex
Biological process	protein homooligomerization; protein folding; negative regulation of protein refolding; response to bacterium; chaperone cofactor-dependent protein refolding; protein homotetramerization
Sources:Amigo / QuickGO
Orthologs
Databases	NCBI: entry; OMA: entry
Species	Human	Mouse
Entrez	6767	70356
Ensembl	ENSG00000100380	ENSMUSG00000022403
UniProt	P50502	Q99L47
RefSeq (mRNA)	NM_003932; NM_001278589	NM_133726
RefSeq (protein)	NP_001265518; NP_003923	NP_598487
Location (UCSC)	Chr 22: 40.82 – 40.86 Mb	Chr 15: 81.25 – 81.28 Mb
PubMed search
- Wikidata
View/Edit Human	View/Edit Mouse

Hsc70-interacting protein also known as suppression of tumorigenicity 13 (ST13) is a protein that in humans is encoded by the ST13 gene.

== Function ==
The protein encoded by this gene is an adaptor protein that mediates the association of the heat shock proteins HSP70 and HSP90. This protein has been shown to be involved in the assembly process of glucocorticoid receptor, which requires the assistance of multiple molecular chaperones. The expression of this gene is reported to be downregulated in colorectal carcinoma tissue suggesting that is a candidate tumor suppressor gene.
