= Stress-induced-phosphoprotein 1 =

Protein-coding gene in the species Homo sapiens

STIP1
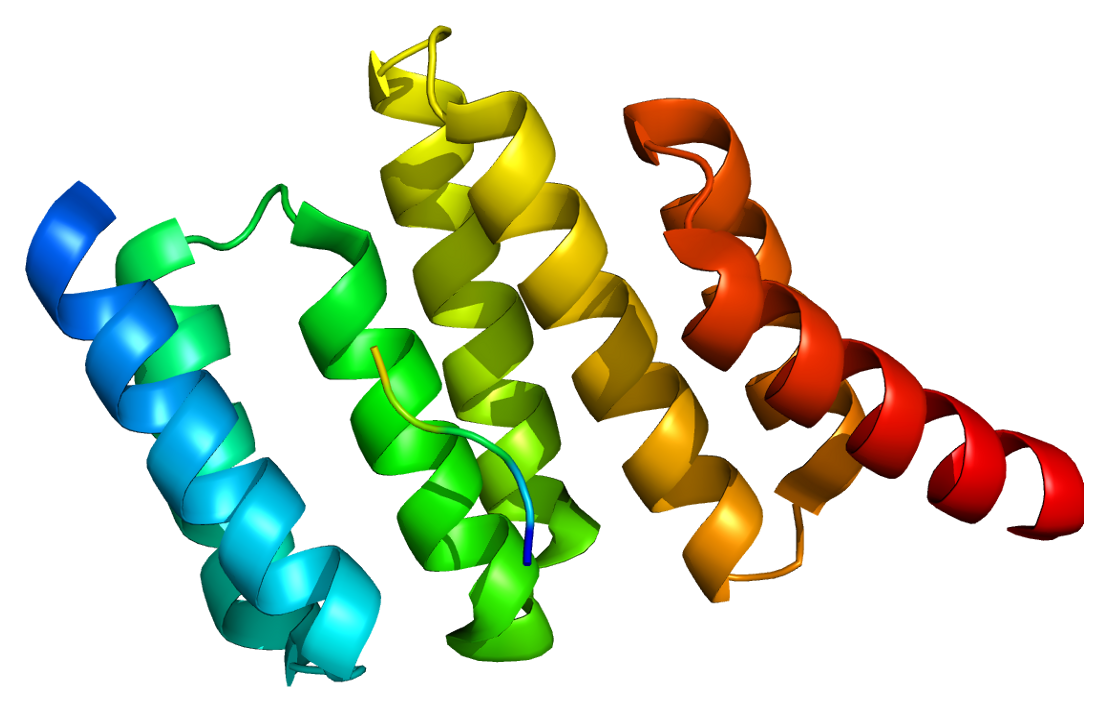

Identifiers
- Aliases: STIP1, HEL-S-94n, HOP, IEF-SSP-3521, P60, STI1, STI1L, stress induced phosphoprotein 1
- External IDs: OMIM: 605063; MGI: 109130; GeneCards: STIP1
Available structures
PDB	Ortholog search: PDBe RCSB
PDB	List of PDB id codes 1ELR, 1ELW, 2LNI, 3ESK, 3FWV

Gene location (Human)
Chr.	Chromosome 11 (human)
Band	11q13.1	Start	64,185,272 bp
Band	11q13.1	End	64,204,543 bp

Gene location (Mouse)
Chr.	Chromosome 19 (mouse)
Band	19|19 A	Start	6,998,070 bp
Band	19|19 A	End	7,017,335 bp
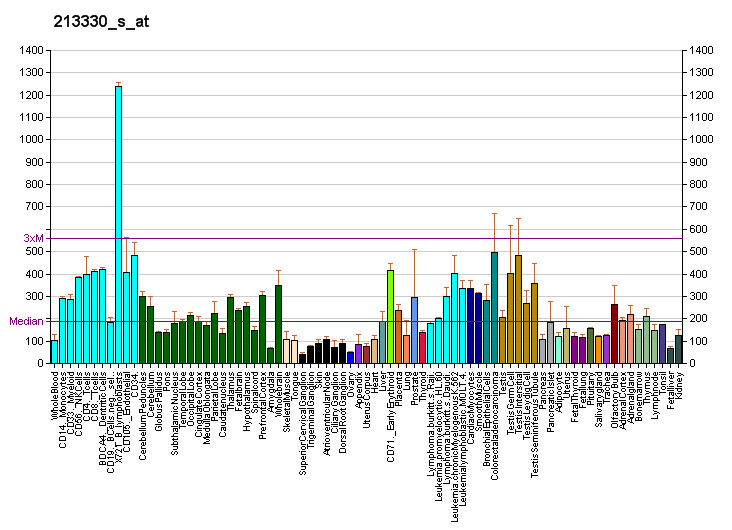

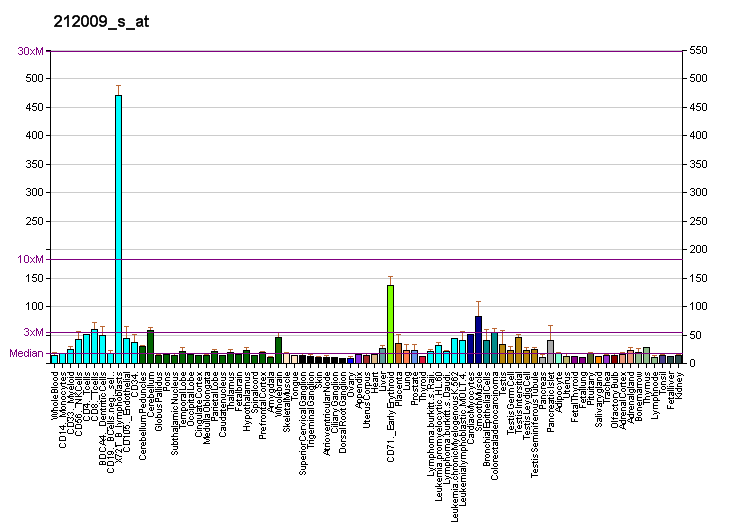
RNA expression pattern
Bgee	Human / Mouse (ortholog); Top expressed in: left testis; ganglionic eminence; ventricular zone; right testis; islet of Langerhans; right adrenal gland; left adrenal gland; right adrenal cortex; left adrenal cortex; stromal cell of endometrium / Top expressed in: morula; morula; tail of embryo; yolk sac; epiblast; blastocyst; ventricular zone; embryo; genital tubercle; neural tube; More reference expression data
BioGPS	More reference expression data
Gene ontology
Molecular function	Hsp70 protein binding; protein C-terminus binding; chaperone binding; protein binding; RNA binding; Hsp90 protein binding
Cellular component	cytoplasm; myelin sheath; Golgi apparatus; nucleus; cytosol; protein-containing complex; chaperone complex
Biological process	response to stress; cellular response to interleukin-7
Sources:Amigo / QuickGO
Orthologs
Databases	NCBI: entry; OMA: entry
Species	Human	Mouse
Entrez	10963	20867
Ensembl	ENSG00000168439	ENSMUSG00000024966
UniProt	P31948	Q60864
RefSeq (mRNA)	NM_006819; NM_001282652; NM_001282653	NM_016737
RefSeq (protein)	NP_001269581; NP_001269582; NP_006810	NP_058017
Location (UCSC)	Chr 11: 64.19 – 64.2 Mb	Chr 19: 7 – 7.02 Mb
PubMed search
- Wikidata
View/Edit Human	View/Edit Mouse

Stress-induced-phosphoprotein 1 also Hsp70-Hsp90 organising protein (Hop) is encoded in the human by the STIP1 gene. It functions as a co-chaperone which reversibly links together the chaperone proteins Hsp70 and Hsp90.

STI1 belongs to the large group of co-chaperones, which regulate and assist the major chaperones (mainly heat shock proteins). It is one of the best studied co-chaperones of the Hsp70-Hsp90 complex. It was first discovered in yeast and homologues were identified in humans, mice, rats, insects, plants, parasites, and viruses. The family of these proteins is referred to as STI1 (stress inducible protein) and can be divided into yeast, plant, and animal STI1 (Hop).

== Synonyms ==
- Hop
- Hsc70/Hsp90-organizing protein
- NY-REN-11 antigen
- P60
- STI1
- STI1L
- STIP1
- Transformation-sensitive protein IEF-SSP-3521

== Gene ==
STIP1 is located on chromosome 11q13.1 and consists of 14 exons.

== Structure ==
STI proteins are characterized by some structural features: All homologues have nine tetratricopeptide repeat (TPR) motifs, that are clustered into domains of three TPRs. The TPR motif is a very common structural feature used by many proteins and provides the ability of directing protein-protein interactions. Crystallographic structural information is available for the N-terminal TPR1 and the central TPR2A domains in complex with Hsp90 resp. Hsp70 ligand peptides.

The Hsp70-Hsp90 Organizing Protein (Hop, STIP1 in humans) is the co-chaperone responsible for the transfer of client proteins between Hsp70 and Hsp90. Hop is evolutionarily conserved in Eukaryotes and is found in both the nucleus and cytoplasm. Drosophila Hop is a monomeric protein that consists of three tetratricopeptide repeat domain regions (TPR1, TPR2A, TPR2B), one aspartic acid-proline repeat domain (DP). The TPR domains interact with the c-terminals of Hsp90 and Hsp70, with TPR1 and TPR2B binding to Hsp70 and TPR2A binding preferentially to Hsp90. The intermediate structures of heat shock machinery are difficult to characterize completely because of the transient and fast-paced nature of chaperone function.

== Function ==
The main function of Hop is to link Hsp70 and Hsp90 together. But recent investigations indicate that it also modulates the chaperone activities of the linked proteins and possibly interacts with other chaperones and proteins. Apart from its role in the Hsp70/Hsp90 "chaperone machine" it seems to participate in other protein complexes too (for example in the signal transduction complex EcR/USP and in the Hepatitis B virus reverse transcriptase complex, which enables the viral replication). It acts as a receptor for prion proteins too. Hop is located in diverse cellular regions and also moves between the cytoplasm and the nucleus.

In Drosophila RNA interference pathways, Hop has been shown to be an integral part of the pre-RISC complex for siRNAs. In the Drosophila Piwi-interacting RNA pathway, the RNA interference pathway responsible for the repression of transposable elements (transposons), Hop has been shown to interact with Piwi, and in the absence of Hop, transposons are derepressed, leading to severe genomic instability and infertility.

== Interactions ==
STI1 has been shown to interact with PRNP and Heat shock protein 90kDa alpha (cytosolic), member A1.
