= MOK protein kinase =

Enzyme found in humans

MOK

Identifiers
- Aliases: MOK, RAGE, RAGE-1, RAGE1, STK30, MOK protein kinase
- External IDs: OMIM: 605762; MGI: 1336881; GeneCards: MOK
Enzyme activity
EC #	BRENDA	ExPASy	KEGG	MetaCyc
2.7.11.22	↗	↗	↗	↗

Gene location (Human)
Chr.	Chromosome 14 (human)
Band	14q32.31	Start	102,224,500 bp
Band	14q32.31	End	102,305,190 bp

Gene location (Mouse)
Chr.	Chromosome 12 (mouse)
Band	12|12 F1	Start	110,807,798 bp
Band	12|12 F1	End	110,840,939 bp
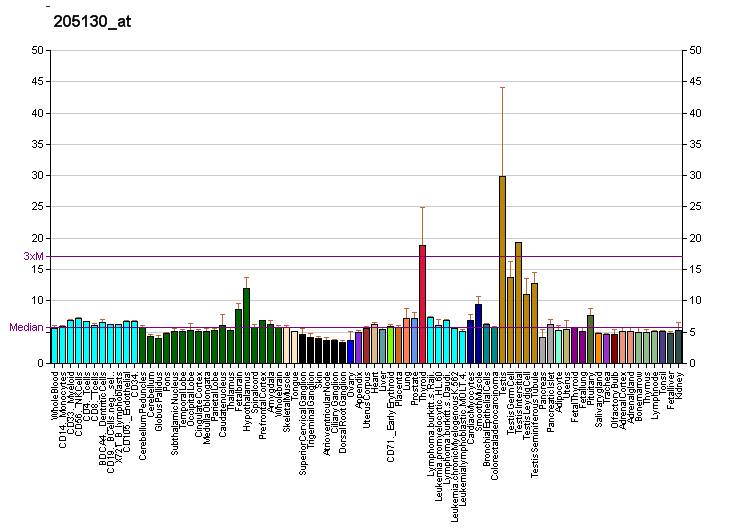
RNA expression pattern
Bgee	Human / Mouse (ortholog); Top expressed in: right uterine tube; left testis; right testis; epithelium of bronchus; anterior pituitary; bronchial epithelial cell; sural nerve; right lobe of thyroid gland; olfactory zone of nasal mucosa; left lobe of thyroid gland / Top expressed in: superior surface of tongue; gallbladder; seminiferous tubule; zygote; spermatid; spermatocyte; secondary oocyte; primary oocyte; neural layer of retina; saccule; More reference expression data
BioGPS	More reference expression data
Gene ontology
Molecular function	transferase activity; protein kinase activity; nucleotide binding; protein serine/threonine kinase activity; cyclin-dependent protein serine/threonine kinase activity; ATP binding; kinase activity; metal ion binding
Cellular component	cell projection; cilium; ciliary base; nucleus; cytoplasm
Biological process	protein phosphorylation; phosphorylation; signal transduction; regulation of cell cycle; regulation of gene expression; intracellular signal transduction
Sources:Amigo / QuickGO
Orthologs
Databases	NCBI: entry; OMA: entry
Species	Human	Mouse
Entrez	5891	26448
Ensembl	ENSG00000080823	ENSMUSG00000056458
UniProt	Q9UQ07	Q9WVS4
RefSeq (mRNA)	NM_001272011; NM_014226; NM_001330234; NM_001353827; NM_001353828 NM_001353829; NM_001353830; NM_001353831; NM_001353832	NM_011973
RefSeq (protein)	NP_001258940; NP_001317163; NP_055041; NP_001340756; NP_001340757 NP_001340758; NP_001340759; NP_001340760; NP_001340761	NP_036103
Location (UCSC)	Chr 14: 102.22 – 102.31 Mb	Chr 12: 110.81 – 110.84 Mb
PubMed search
- Wikidata
View/Edit Human	View/Edit Mouse

MAPK/MAK/MRK overlapping kinase is an enzyme that in humans is encoded by the MOK gene (previously RAGE).
