= TOMM34 =

Protein-coding gene in the species Homo sapiens

Identifiers
- Aliases: TOMM34, HTOM34P, TOM34, URCC3, translocase of outer mitochondrial membrane 34
- External IDs: OMIM: 616049; MGI: 1914395; GeneCards: TOMM34

Gene location (Human)
Chr.	Chromosome 20 (human)
Band	20q13.12	Start	44,942,130 bp
Band	20q13.12	End	44,960,397 bp

Gene location (Mouse)
Chr.	Chromosome 2 (mouse)
Band	2|2 H3	Start	163,895,460 bp
Band	2|2 H3	End	163,913,089 bp
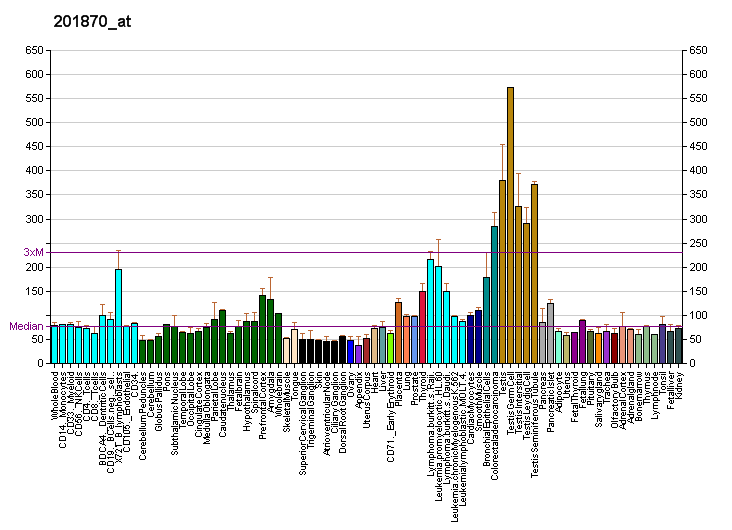
RNA expression pattern
Bgee	Human / Mouse (ortholog); Top expressed in: right testis; left testis; islet of Langerhans; nucleus accumbens; right uterine tube; testicle; right adrenal cortex; caudate nucleus; left adrenal gland; putamen / Top expressed in: blood; zygote; cumulus cell; subiculum; pontine nuclei; mesenteric lymph nodes; primary visual cortex; superior frontal gyrus; dentate gyrus of hippocampal formation granule cell; pituitary gland; More reference expression data
BioGPS	More reference expression data
Gene ontology
Molecular function	protein binding; heat shock protein binding
Cellular component	integral component of membrane; mitochondrial outer membrane; membrane; mitochondrion; nucleus; nucleoplasm; cytoplasm; cytosol
Biological process	protein targeting to mitochondrion
Sources:Amigo / QuickGO
Orthologs
Databases	NCBI: entry; OMA: entry
Species	Human	Mouse
Entrez	10953	67145
Ensembl	ENSG00000025772	ENSMUSG00000018322
UniProt	Q15785	Q9CYG7
RefSeq (mRNA)	NM_006809	NM_001291155; NM_025996
RefSeq (protein)	NP_006800	NP_001278084; NP_080272
Location (UCSC)	Chr 20: 44.94 – 44.96 Mb	Chr 2: 163.9 – 163.91 Mb
PubMed search
- Wikidata
View/Edit Human	View/Edit Mouse

Mitochondrial import receptor subunit TOM34 is a protein that in humans is encoded by the TOMM34 gene.

The protein encoded by this gene is involved in the import of precursor proteins into mitochondria. The encoded protein has a chaperone-like activity, binding the mature portion of unfolded proteins and aiding their import into mitochondria. This protein, which is found in the cytoplasm and sometimes associated with the outer mitochondrial membrane, has a weak ATPase activity and contains 6 TPR repeats.
