= Auxilin =

Protein found in humans

DNAJC6
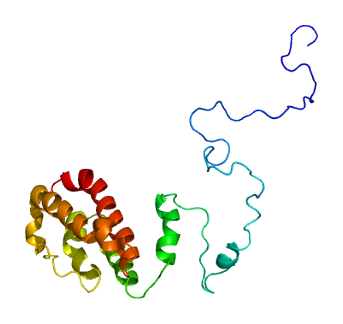

Identifiers
- Aliases: DNAJC6, DJC6, PARK19, Auxilin, DnaJ heat shock protein family (Hsp40) member C6
- External IDs: OMIM: 608375; MGI: 1919935; GeneCards: DNAJC6

Gene location (Human)
Chr.	Chromosome 1 (human)
Band	1p31.3	Start	65,248,219 bp
Band	1p31.3	End	65,415,871 bp

Gene location (Mouse)
Chr.	Chromosome 4 (mouse)
Band	4|4 C6	Start	101,353,828 bp
Band	4|4 C6	End	101,499,996 bp
RNA expression pattern
Bgee	Human / Mouse (ortholog); Top expressed in: endothelial cell; Brodmann area 23; pars compacta; pars reticulata; orbitofrontal cortex; middle temporal gyrus; lateral nuclear group of thalamus; pons; inferior olivary nucleus; Brodmann area 46 / Top expressed in: medial dorsal nucleus; dorsomedial hypothalamic nucleus; ventral tegmental area; pontine nuclei; medial geniculate nucleus; paraventricular nucleus of hypothalamus; lateral geniculate nucleus; piriform cortex; primary motor cortex; central gray substance of midbrain; More reference expression data
BioGPS	n/a
Gene ontology
Molecular function	protein tyrosine phosphatase activity; SH3 domain binding; phosphoprotein phosphatase activity; hydrolase activity; clathrin binding
Cellular component	cytosol; synapse; vesicle; postsynaptic density; cytoplasm; intracellular membrane-bounded organelle; presynapse
Biological process	peptidyl-tyrosine dephosphorylation; regulation of clathrin-dependent endocytosis; protein dephosphorylation; clathrin coat disassembly; receptor-mediated endocytosis; membrane organization; synaptic vesicle uncoating; clathrin-dependent endocytosis
Sources:Amigo / QuickGO
Orthologs
Databases	NCBI: entry; OMA: entry
Species	Human	Mouse
Entrez	9829	72685
Ensembl	ENSG00000116675	ENSMUSG00000028528
UniProt	O75061	Q80TZ3
RefSeq (mRNA)	NM_001256864; NM_001256865; NM_014787	NM_001164583; NM_001164584; NM_001164585; NM_198412; NM_001355179 NM_001355180
RefSeq (protein)	NP_001243793; NP_001243794; NP_055602	NP_001158055; NP_001158056; NP_001158057; NP_940804; NP_001342108 NP_001342109
Location (UCSC)	Chr 1: 65.25 – 65.42 Mb	Chr 4: 101.35 – 101.5 Mb
PubMed search
- Wikidata
View/Edit Human	View/Edit Mouse

Putative tyrosine-protein phosphatase auxilin is an enzyme that in humans is encoded by the DNAJC6 gene.

== Function ==
DNAJC6 belongs to the evolutionarily conserved DNAJ/HSP40 family of proteins, which regulate molecular chaperone activity by stimulating ATPase activity. DNAJ proteins may have up to 3 distinct domains: a conserved 70-amino acid J domain, usually at the N terminus, a glycine/phenylalanine (G/F)-rich region, and a cysteine-rich domain containing 4 motifs resembling a zinc-finger domain (Ohtsuka and Hata, 2000).

== Structure ==
The protein tyrosine phosphatase domain and C2 domain pair of auxilin, located near the N-terminus of the polypeptide, constitute a superdomain, a tandem arrangement of two or more nominally unrelated domains that form a single heritable unit. The phosphatase domain belongs to the auxilin subfamily of lipid phosphatases and is predicted to be catalytically inactive.
