= HSP90B1 =

Protein-coding gene in the species Homo sapiens

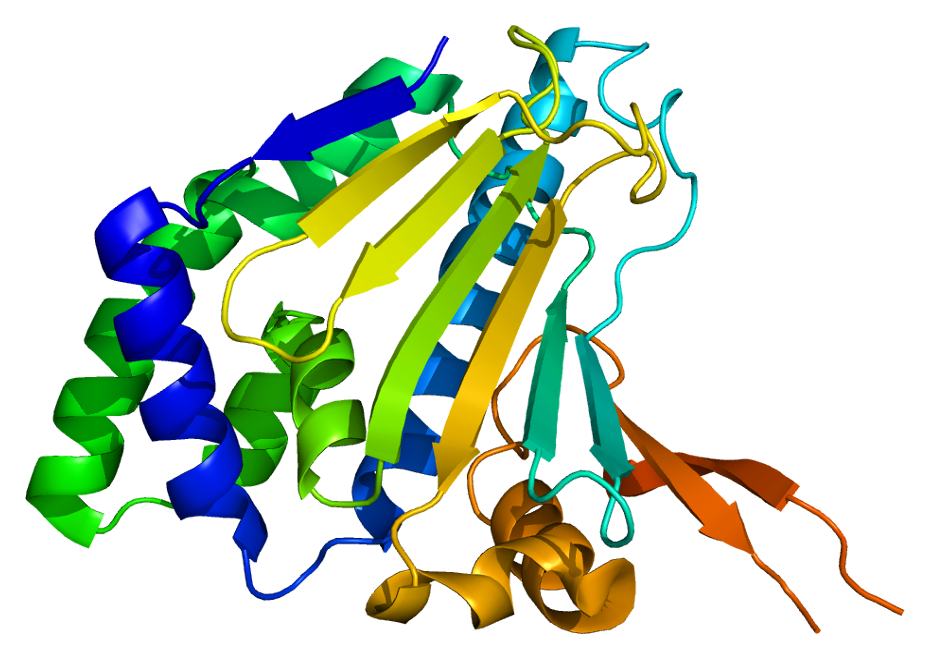

Identifiers
- Aliases: HSP90B1, ECGP, GP96, GRP94, HEL-S-125m, HEL35, TRA1, heat shock protein 90kDa beta family member 1, heat shock protein 90 beta family member 1
- External IDs: OMIM: 191175; MGI: 98817; GeneCards: HSP90B1
Available structures
PDB	Ortholog search: PDBe RCSB
PDB	List of PDB id codes 4NH9

Gene location (Human)
Chr.	Chromosome 12 (human)
Band	12q23.3	Start	103,930,107 bp
Band	12q23.3	End	103,953,931 bp

Gene location (Mouse)
Chr.	Chromosome 10 (mouse)
Band	10 C1|10 43.05 cM	Start	86,526,073 bp
Band	10 C1|10 43.05 cM	End	86,541,373 bp
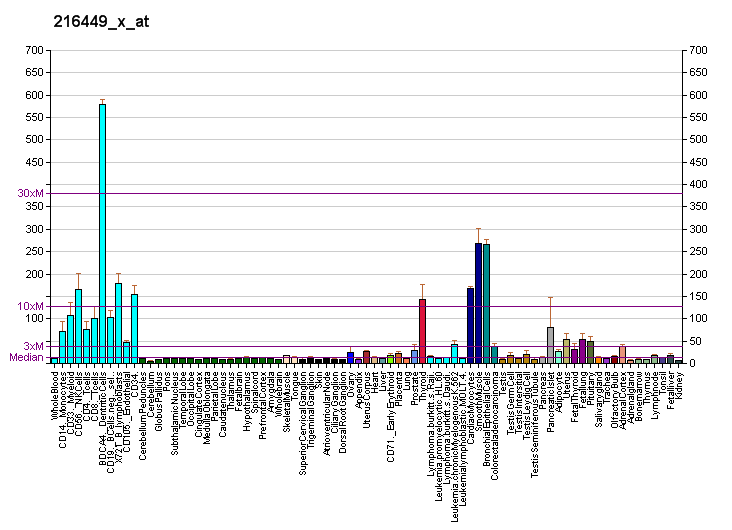

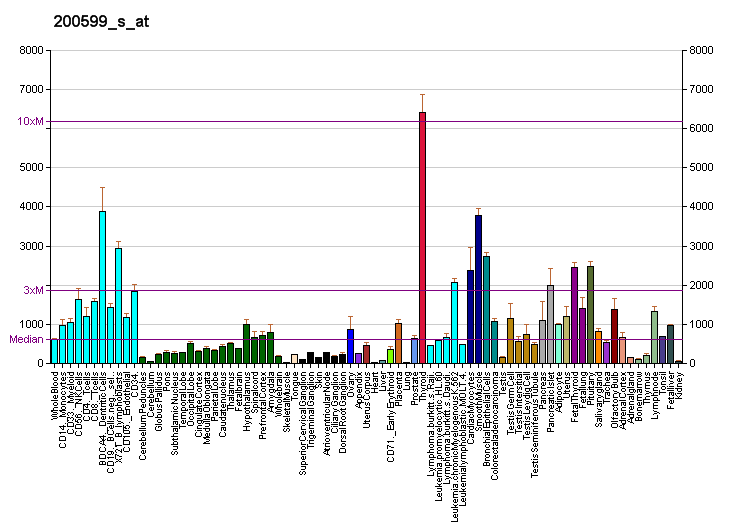

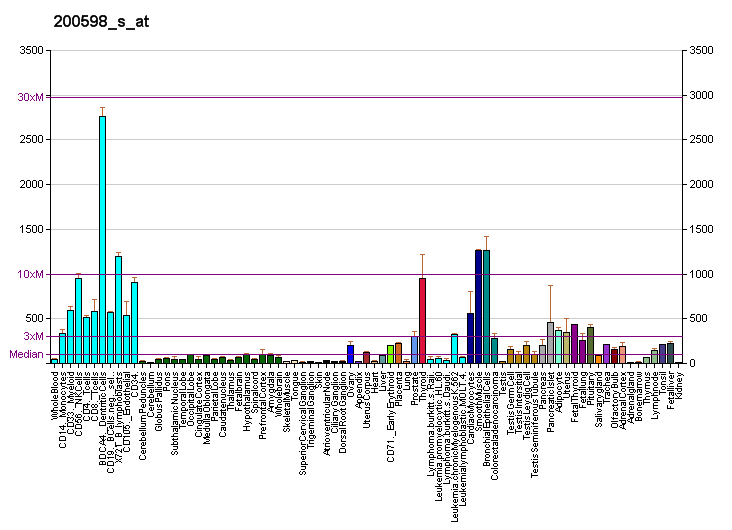
RNA expression pattern
Bgee	Human / Mouse (ortholog); Top expressed in: right lobe of thyroid gland; left lobe of thyroid gland; corpus epididymis; pericardium; islet of Langerhans; anterior pituitary; tendon of biceps brachii; pylorus; Achilles tendon; caput epididymis / Top expressed in: tail of embryo; genital tubercle; migratory enteric neural crest cell; medullary collecting duct; abdominal wall; dermis; spermatocyte; renal corpuscle; supraoptic nucleus; seminal vesicula; More reference expression data
BioGPS	More reference expression data
Gene ontology
Molecular function	nucleotide binding; calcium ion binding; unfolded protein binding; low-density lipoprotein particle receptor binding; protein binding; RNA binding; protein phosphatase binding; ATP binding
Cellular component	cytosol; endocytic vesicle lumen; endoplasmic reticulum lumen; endoplasmic reticulum membrane; membrane; focal adhesion; extracellular matrix; melanosome; plasma membrane; endoplasmic reticulum chaperone complex; extracellular region; midbody; endoplasmic reticulum; perinuclear region of cytoplasm; extracellular exosome; nucleus; protein-containing complex; collagen-containing extracellular matrix
Biological process	response to hypoxia; response to stress; protein folding in endoplasmic reticulum; negative regulation of apoptotic process; receptor-mediated endocytosis; response to endoplasmic reticulum stress; toll-like receptor signaling pathway; regulation of phosphoprotein phosphatase activity; ATF6-mediated unfolded protein response; actin rod assembly; retrograde protein transport, ER to cytosol; sequestering of calcium ion; protein folding; ubiquitin-dependent ERAD pathway; protein transport; cellular response to ATP; post-translational protein modification; cytokine-mediated signaling pathway
Sources:Amigo / QuickGO
Orthologs
Databases	NCBI: entry; OMA: entry
Species	Human	Mouse
Entrez	7184	22027
Ensembl	ENSG00000166598	ENSMUSG00000020048
UniProt	P14625	P08113
RefSeq (mRNA)	NM_003299	NM_011631
RefSeq (protein)	NP_003290	NP_035761
Location (UCSC)	Chr 12: 103.93 – 103.95 Mb	Chr 10: 86.53 – 86.54 Mb
PubMed search
- Wikidata
View/Edit Human	View/Edit Mouse

Heat shock protein 90kDa beta member 1 (HSP90B1), known also as endoplasmin, gp96, grp94, or ERp99, is a chaperone protein that in humans is encoded by the HSP90B1 gene.

HSP90B1 is an HSP90 paralogue that is found in the endoplasmic reticulum. It plays critical roles in folding proteins in the secretory pathway such as Toll-like receptors and integrins. It has been implicated as an essential immune chaperone to regulate both innate and adaptive immunity. Tumor-derived HSP90B1 (vitespen) has entered clinical trials for cancer immunotherapy.

grp94 has been shown to be a target for treatment of a plethora of diseases such as glaucoma, multiple myeloma, and metastatic cancer. grp94 includes 5 distinct amino acids in its primary sequence which creates 2 unique sub-pockets, S1 and S2. These sub-pockets have been utilized in current research in order to inhibit the chaperone since its client proteins seem to be up-regulated in cancer cells.
