= AHSA1 =

Protein-coding gene in the species Homo sapiens

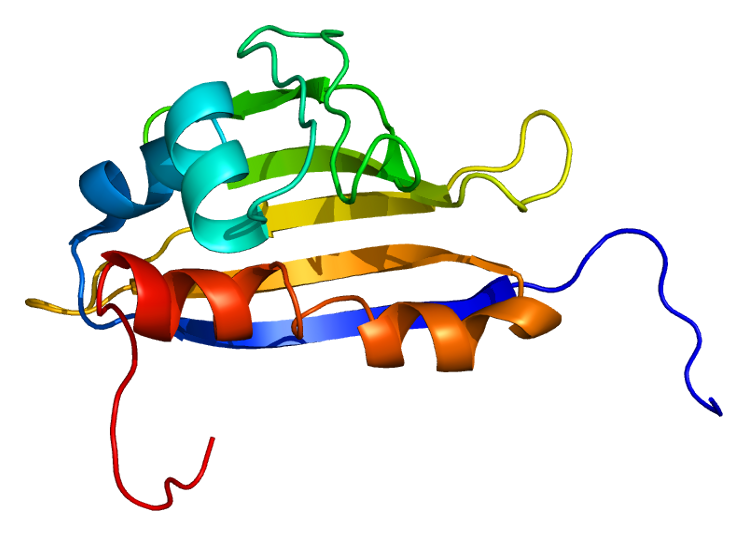
Available structures
| PDB | Ortholog search: PDBe RCSB |
| PDB | List of PDB id codes 1X53 |

Identifiers
- Aliases: AHSA1, AHA1, C14orf3, p38, hAha1, activator of Hsp90 ATPase activity 1
- External IDs: OMIM: 608466; MGI: 2387603; HomoloGene: 8106; GeneCards: AHSA1; OMA:AHSA1 - orthologs

Gene location (Human)
| Chr. | Chromosome 14 (human) |
| Band | 14q24.3 | Start | 77,457,870 bp |
| Band | 14q24.3 | End | 77,469,472 bp |

Gene location (Mouse)
| Chr. | Chromosome 12 (mouse) |
| Band | 12|12 D2 | Start | 87,313,253 bp |
| Band | 12|12 D2 | End | 87,320,772 bp |
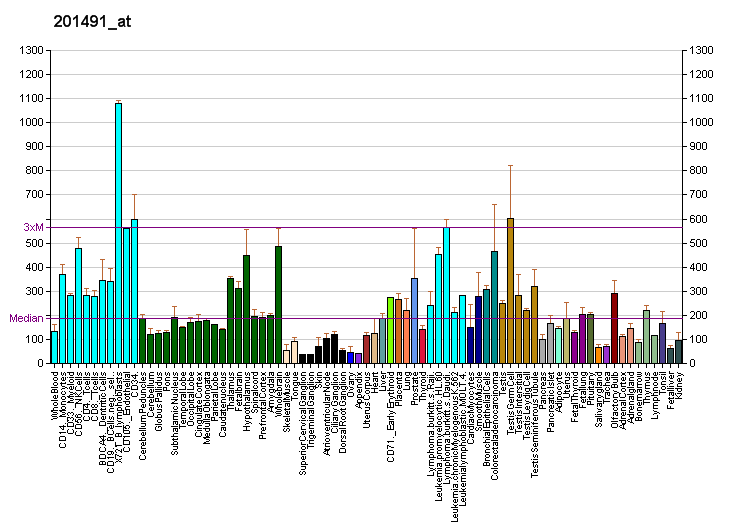
RNA expression pattern
| Bgee | Human / Mouse (ortholog); Top expressed in: oocyte; right testis; secondary oocyte; left testis; right uterine tube; ventricular zone; ganglionic eminence; muscle of thigh; C1 segment; Brodmann area 9 / Top expressed in: otic vesicle; saccule; otic placode; zygote; epiblast; mandibular prominence; embryo; maxillary prominence; fetal liver hematopoietic progenitor cell; dentate gyrus of hippocampal formation granule cell; More reference expression data |
| BioGPS | More reference expression data |
Gene ontology
| Molecular function | ATPase activator activity; chaperone binding; protein binding; cadherin binding; Hsp90 protein binding |
| Cellular component | extracellular exosome; endoplasmic reticulum; cytoplasm; cytosol |
| Biological process | response to stress; positive regulation of ATP-dependent activity |
Sources:Amigo / QuickGO
Orthologs
| Species | Human | Mouse |
| Entrez | 10598 | 217737 |
| Ensembl | ENSG00000100591 | ENSMUSG00000021037 |
| UniProt | O95433 | Q8BK64 |
| RefSeq (mRNA) | NM_012111; NM_001321441 | NM_146036 |
| RefSeq (protein) | NP_001308370; NP_036243 | NP_666148 |
| Location (UCSC) | Chr 14: 77.46 – 77.47 Mb | Chr 12: 87.31 – 87.32 Mb |
| PubMed search |
- Wikidata
| View/Edit Human | View/Edit Mouse |

Activator of 90 kDa heat shock protein ATPase homolog 1 is an enzyme that in humans is encoded by the AHSA1 gene.

== Interactions ==
AHSA1 has been shown to interact with Heat shock protein 90kDa alpha (cytosolic), member A1.
