= Chaperone-assisted selective autophagy =

Chaperone-assisted selective autophagy is a cellular process for the selective, ubiquitin-dependent degradation of chaperone-bound proteins in lysosomes.

Autophagy (Greek: ‘self-eating’) was initially identified as a catabolic process for the unselective degradation of cellular content in lysosomes under starvation conditions. However, autophagy also comprises selective degradation pathways, which depend on ubiquitin conjugation to initiate sorting to lysosomes. In the case of chaperone-assisted selective autophagy, dysfunctional, nonnative proteins are recognized by molecular chaperones and become ubiquitinated by chaperone-associated ubiquitin ligases. The ubiquitinated proteins are enclosed in autophagosomes, which eventually fuse with lysosomes, leading to the degradation of the dysfunctional proteins. Chaperone-assisted selective autophagy is a vital part of the cellular protein quality control system. It is essential for protein homeostasis (proteostasis) in neurons and in mechanically strained cells and tissues such as skeletal muscle, heart and lung.

== Components and mechanism ==
The chaperone-assisted selective autophagy complex comprises the molecular chaperones HSPA8 and HSPB8, and the cochaperones BAG3 and STUB1. The cochaperone BAG3 plays a vital role in maintaining homeostasis. BAG3 facilitates the cooperation of HSPA8 and HSPB8 during the recognition of nonnative client proteins. HSPBs are chaperones that interact with misfolded substrates without the need for ATP to avoid aggregation. HSPB8 interacts with other HSPBs weakly and mostly forms homodimers. STUB1 mediates the ubiquitination of the chaperone-bound client, which induces the recruitment of the autophagic ubiquitin adaptor SQSTM1. The adaptor simultaneously interacts with the ubiquitinated client and autophagosome membrane precursors, thereby inducing the autophagic engulfment of the client. Autophagosome formation during chaperone-assisted selective autophagy depends on an interaction of BAG3 with SYNPO2, which triggers the cooperation with a VPS18-containing protein complex that mediates the fusion of autophagosome membrane precursors. The formed autophagosomes finally fuse with lysosomes, resulting in client degradation. There are 5 main components for the chaperone-assisted selective autophagy complex are the molecular chaperones, autophagy receptors, autophagy equipment, lysosomes, and the substrates. The damaged and misfolded proteins inside the cell are recognized by the molecular chaperones, which afterwards bind to them. The receptors attach themselves to substrates that are connected to chaperones. This helps the substrate degrade. The chaperone-assisted selective autophagy substrates could be sent to specific areas like aggresomes for additional processing. The aggresomes are stress-induced juxta-nuclear inclusion bodies that requires an intact microtubular network to colocalize misfolded proteins, molecular chaperones, and UPS components at the microtubule organizing center. The chaperone-assisted selective autophagy is dependent on the formation of a heteromeric complex. This consists of the heat shock proteins and BAG3. The BAG family has 6 cochaperone members and BAG1 was identified as an interactor of Bcl-2 proteins which is an anti-apoptotic protein. The activation of HSF1 is the primary mechanism by which heat shock, proteasome inhibition, oxidative stress, and other stressors increase BAG3 expression.

The chaperone-assisted selective autophagy complex comprises the molecular chaperones HSPA8 and HSPB8, and the cochaperones BAG3 and STUB1. BAG3 facilitates the cooperation of HSPA8 and HSPB8 during the recognition of nonnative client proteins. STUB1 mediates the ubiquitination of the chaperone-bound client, which induces the recruitment of the autophagic ubiquitin adaptor SQSTM1. The adaptor simultaneously interacts with the ubiquitinated client and autophagosome membrane precursors, thereby inducing the autophagic engulfment of the client. Autophagosome formation during chaperone-assisted selective autophagy depends on an interaction of BAG3 with SYNPO2, which triggers the cooperation with a VPS18-containing protein complex that mediates the fusion of autophagosome membrane precursors. The formed autophagosomes finally fuse with lysosomes, resulting in client degradation.

== Clients and physiological role ==
Proteins that are degraded by chaperone-assisted selective autophagy include pathogenic forms of the Huntingtin protein, which cause Huntington's disease. Furthermore, the expression of the cochaperone BAG3 is upregulated in aged neuronal cells, which correlates with an increased necessity to dispose oxidatively damaged proteins through autophagy. Chaperone-assisted selective autophagy is thus essential for proteostasis in neurons.

In mechanically strained cells and tissues, chaperone-assisted selective autophagy mediates the degradation of the actin-crosslinking protein filamin. Mechanical tension results in unfolding of filamin, leading to recognition by the chaperone complex and to the autophagic degradation of damaged filamin. This is a prerequisite for the maintenance of the actin cytoskeleton in mechanically strained cells and tissues. Impairment of chaperone-assisted selective autophagy in patients and animal models causes muscle dystrophy and cardiomyopathy.
