= BAG3 =

Protein found in humans

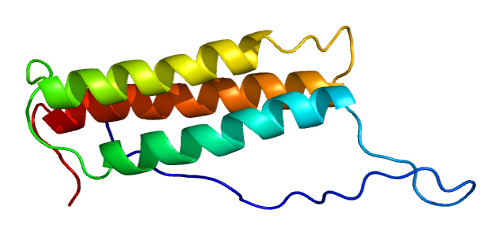

Identifiers
- Aliases: BAG3, BAG-3, BIS, CAIR-1, MFM6, BCL2 associated athanogene 3, BAG cochaperone 3
- External IDs: OMIM: 603883; MGI: 1352493; GeneCards: BAG3
Available structures
| PDB | Ortholog search: PDBe RCSB |
| PDB | List of PDB id codes 1UK5 |

Gene location (Human)
| Chr. | Chromosome 10 (human) |
| Band | 10q26.11 | Start | 119,651,380 bp |
| Band | 10q26.11 | End | 119,677,819 bp |

Gene location (Mouse)
| Chr. | Chromosome 7 (mouse) |
| Band | 7|7 F3 | Start | 128,125,340 bp |
| Band | 7|7 F3 | End | 128,148,705 bp |
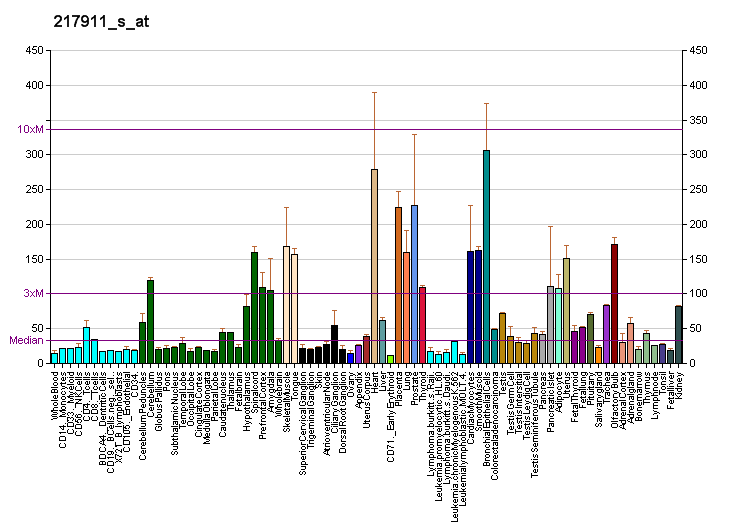
RNA expression pattern
| Bgee | Human / Mouse (ortholog); Top expressed in: gastrocnemius muscle; Skeletal muscle tissue of rectus abdominis; body of tongue; glutes; muscle of thigh; quadriceps femoris muscle; vastus lateralis muscle; tibialis anterior muscle; triceps brachii muscle; vena cava / Top expressed in: cardiac muscle tissue of left ventricle; gastrula; muscle of thigh; ankle; plantaris muscle; interventricular septum; right ventricle; soleus muscle; extraocular muscle; digastric muscle; More reference expression data |
| BioGPS | More reference expression data |
Gene ontology
| Molecular function | chaperone binding; protein binding; adenyl-nucleotide exchange factor activity; cadherin binding; protein-containing complex binding |
| Cellular component | cytosol; plasma membrane; Z discdkac; neuron projection; nucleus; cytoplasm |
| Biological process | negative regulation of striated muscle cell apoptotic process; protein stabilization; negative regulation of apoptotic process; cellular response to mechanical stimulus; brain development; protein folding; spinal cord development; extrinsic apoptotic signaling pathway in absence of ligand; regulation of cellular response to heat; extrinsic apoptotic signaling pathway via death domain receptors; apoptotic process; regulation of catalytic activity; cellular response to heat; positive regulation of protein export from nucleus; negative regulation of transcription from RNA polymerase II promoter in response to stress; positive regulation of protein import into nucleus |
Sources:Amigo / QuickGO
Orthologs
| Databases | NCBI: entry; OMA: entry |
| Species | Human | Mouse |
| Entrez | 9531 | 29810 |
| Ensembl | ENSG00000151929 | ENSMUSG00000030847 |
| UniProt | O95817 | Q9JLV1 |
| RefSeq (mRNA) | NM_004281 | NM_013863 |
| RefSeq (protein) | NP_004272 | NP_038891 |
| Location (UCSC) | Chr 10: 119.65 – 119.68 Mb | Chr 7: 128.13 – 128.15 Mb |
| PubMed search |
- Wikidata
| View/Edit Human | View/Edit Mouse |

BAG family molecular chaperone regulator 3 is a protein that in humans is encoded by the BAG3 gene. BAG3 is involved in chaperone-assisted selective autophagy.

== Function ==
BAG proteins compete with Hip-1 for binding to the Hsc70/Hsp70 ATPase domain and promote substrate release. All the BAG proteins have an approximately 45-amino acid BAG domain near the C terminus but differ markedly in their N-terminal regions. The protein encoded by this gene contains a WW domain in the N-terminal region and a BAG domain in the C-terminal region. The BAG domains of BAG1, BAG2, and BAG3 interact specifically with the Hsc70 ATPase domain in vitro and in mammalian cells. All 3 proteins bind with high affinity to the ATPase domain of Hsc70 and inhibit its chaperone activity in a Hip-repressible manner.

== Clinical significance ==
BAG gene has been implicated in age related neurodegenerative diseases such as Alzheimer's. It has been demonstrated that BAG1 and BAG3 regulate the proteasomal and lysosomal protein elimination pathways, respectively. It has also been shown to be a cause of familial dilated cardiomyopathy. That BAG3 mutations are responsible for familial dilated cardiomyopathy is confirmed by another study describing 6 new molecular variants (2 missense and 4 premature Stops ). Moreover, the same publication reported that BAG3 polymorphisms are also associated with sporadic forms of the disease together with HSPB7 locus.

In muscle cells, BAG3 cooperates with the molecular chaperones Hsc70 and HspB8 to induce the degradation of mechanically damaged cytoskeleton components in lysosomes. This process is called chaperone-assisted selective autophagy and is essential for maintaining muscle activity in flies, mice and men.

BAG3 is able to stimulate the expression of cytoskeleton proteins in response to mechanical tension by activating the transcription regulators YAP1 and WWTR1. BAG3 balances protein synthesis and protein degradation under mechanical stress.

== Interactions ==
PLCG1 has been shown to interact with:

- FGFR1,
- CD117,
- CD31,
- Cbl gene
- CISH
- Epidermal growth factor receptor,
- Eukaryotic translation elongation factor 1 alpha 1,
- FLT1,
- GAB1,
- GIT1,
- Grb2,
- HER2/neu,
- IRS2,
- ITK,
- KHDRBS1,
- Linker of activated T cells,
- Lymphocyte cytosolic protein 2,
- PDGFRA,
- PLD2,
- RHOA,
- SOS1,
- TUB,
- TrkA,
- TrkB,
- VAV1, and
- Wiskott-Aldrich syndrome protein.
