= LAMP3 =

Protein-coding gene in the species Homo sapiens

Identifiers
- Aliases: LAMP3, CD208, DC LAMP, DC-LAMP, DCLAMP, LAMP, LAMP-3, TSC403, lysosomal-associated membrane protein 3, lysosomal associated membrane protein 3
- External IDs: OMIM: 605883; MGI: 2441659; GeneCards: LAMP3
Available structures
PDB	Ortholog search: PDBe RCSB
PDB	List of PDB id codes 4AKM

Gene location (Human)
Chr.	Chromosome 3 (human)
Band	3q27.1	Start	183,122,215 bp
Band	3q27.1	End	183,163,839 bp

Gene location (Mouse)
Chr.	Chromosome 16 (mouse)
Band	16|16 A3	Start	19,472,128 bp
Band	16|16 A3	End	19,525,125 bp
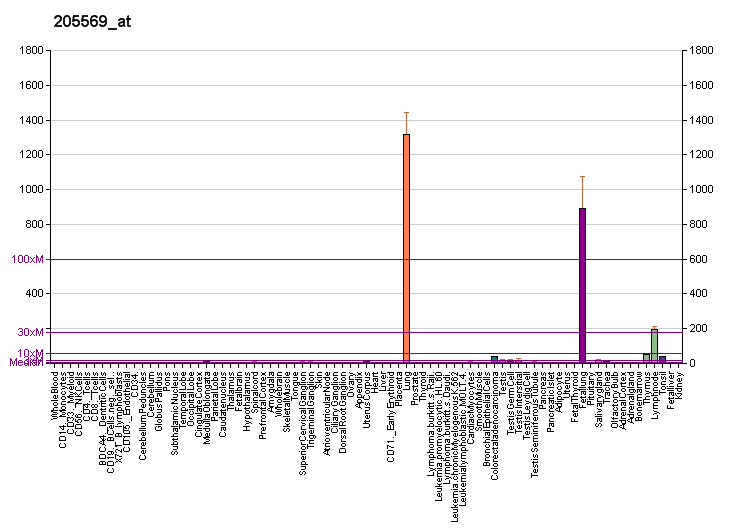
RNA expression pattern
Bgee	Human / Mouse (ortholog); Top expressed in: lower lobe of lung; sperm; visceral pleura; palpebral conjunctiva; epithelium of nasopharynx; upper lobe of lung; appendix; upper lobe of left lung; hair follicle; gingival epithelium / Top expressed in: lung; blastocyst; lens; neural layer of retina; spleen; spermatid; heart; More reference expression data
BioGPS	More reference expression data
Orthologs
Databases	NCBI: entry; OMA: entry
Species	Human	Mouse
Entrez	27074	239739
Ensembl	ENSG00000078081	ENSMUSG00000041247
UniProt	Q9UQV4	Q7TST5
RefSeq (mRNA)	NM_014398	NM_177356
RefSeq (protein)	NP_055213	NP_796330
Location (UCSC)	Chr 3: 183.12 – 183.16 Mb	Chr 16: 19.47 – 19.53 Mb
PubMed search
- Wikidata
View/Edit Human	View/Edit Mouse

Lysosome-associated membrane glycoprotein 3 (LAMP3, Lamp3) is a protein that in humans is encoded by the LAMP3 gene. It is one of the lysosome-associated membrane glycoproteins.

LAMP3 also known as DC-LAMP (Dendritic cell lysosomal associated membrane glycoprotein) is a member of the LAMP family along with LAMP1 and LAMP2, these proteins make up the members of the glycoconjugate coat present on the inside of the lysosomal membrane. In humans, this protein is almost exclusively found in mature Dendritic cells. While LAMP3 can be observed on the surface of dendritic cells, the protein is mainly found within lysosomes. LAMP3 first appears in the MHC Class II compartment and in cells aids in the identifying and processing of an antigen during an immune response. LAMP3 protein is linked with the maturation of dendritic cells, and as a marker for transformed type II pneumocytes or alveolar cells.

Studies have linked LAMP3 with the inhibition of the viral replication of Influenza A cells.

== Structure and Tissue Distribution ==
LAMP3 is a Type I integral membrane protein consisting of about 416 amino acid residues with about 90% of the protein located within the lumen of the lysosomes. LAMP3 has been shown to be highly expressed in dendritic cells during cell differentiation and maturation. During human fetal development, between weeks 10 and 20, LAMP3 is highly expressed in the lungs, while in normal adult tissue cells LAMP3 is expressed in the lungs, appendix, testis and lymph nodes.
