= QX39 =

Chemical compound

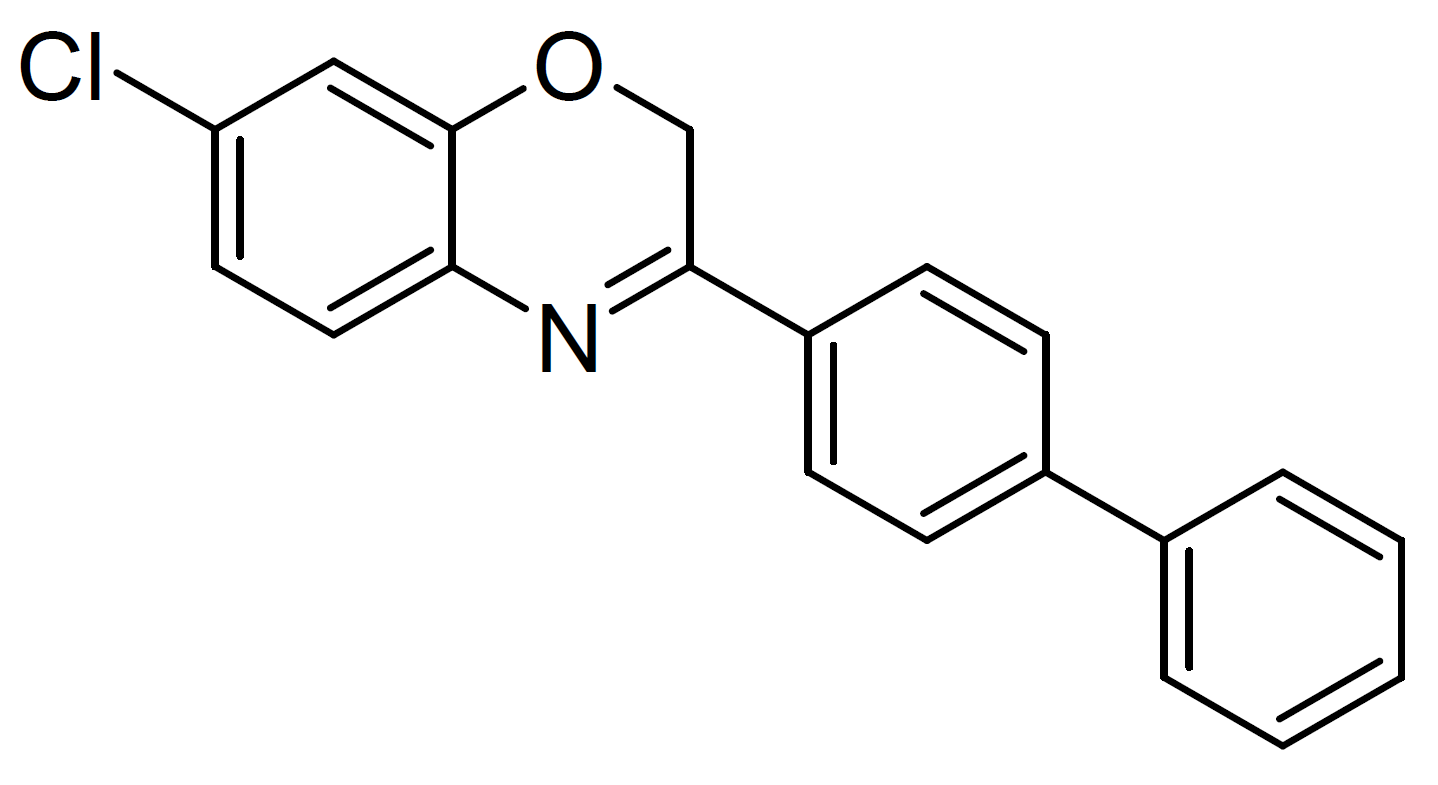

Identifiers
- IUPAC name: N-(4-(6-chloroquinoxalin-2-yl)phenyl)acetamide
- CAS Number: 1798331-71-1
- PubChem CID: 91809172
- CompTox Dashboard (EPA): DTXSID101336839

Chemical and physical data
- Formula: C_{20}H_{14}ClNO
- Molar mass: 319.79 g·mol^{−1}
- 3D model (JSmol): Interactive image
- SMILES: C1C(=NC2=C(O1)C=C(C=C2)Cl)C3=CC=C(C=C3)C4=CC=CC=C4
- InChI: InChI=1S/C20H14ClNO/c21-17-10-11-18-20(12-17)23-13-19(22-18)16-8-6-15(7-9-16)14-4-2-1-3-5-14/h1-12H,13H2; Key:RJFBVAUZKPHMJI-UHFFFAOYSA-N

QX39 (Compound A, CA39) is a synthetic compound that activates chaperone-mediated autophagy (CMA) by increasing the expression of the lysosomal receptor for this pathway, LAMP2A lysosomes. It showed potent activity in vitro but has poor pharmacokinetic properties and was not suitable for animal research. Subsequent research led to the development of CA77.1, a CMA activator suitable for in vivo use.
