= CA77 =

CA77 or CA-77 may refer to:

- California State Route 77, a highway in the US state of California
- Ōgaki Station, a railway station in Ōgaki, Gifu, Japan (station code CA77)
- CA77.1, a chemical compound
