= Athanogene =

The term Athanogene, derived from the Greek for "against death" ('athánatos), was incorporated into name of the gene Bcl-2-associated athanogene 1 (BAG-1; alias HAP46/BAG-1M) upon discovery of its ability to confer transfected cells with resistance to apoptosis.
