= VPS11 =

Protein-coding gene in the species Homo sapiens

Identifiers
- Aliases: VPS11, END1, PEP5, RNF108, hHLD12, CORVET/HOPS core subunit, VPS11 core subunit of CORVET and HOPS complexes
- External IDs: OMIM: 608549; MGI: 1918982; GeneCards: VPS11

Gene location (Human)
Chr.	Chromosome 11 (human)
Band	11q23.3	Start	119,067,692 bp
Band	11q23.3	End	119,081,978 bp

Gene location (Mouse)
Chr.	Chromosome 9 (mouse)
Band	9|9 A5.2	Start	44,259,046 bp
Band	9|9 A5.2	End	44,272,967 bp
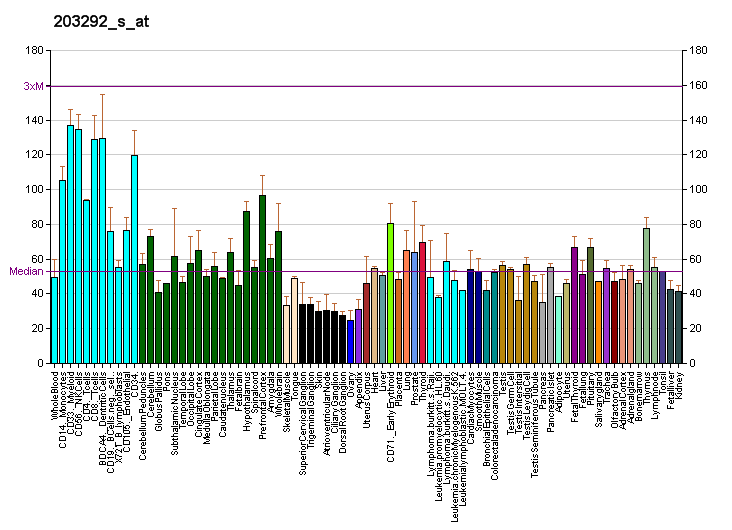
RNA expression pattern
Bgee	Human / Mouse (ortholog); Top expressed in: prefrontal cortex; pituitary gland; apex of heart; right frontal lobe; anterior pituitary; right hemisphere of cerebellum; right adrenal gland; primary visual cortex; putamen; right adrenal cortex / Top expressed in: interventricular septum; granulocyte; neural layer of retina; dentate gyrus of hippocampal formation granule cell; superior frontal gyrus; primary visual cortex; ankle; muscle of thigh; cerebellar cortex; right kidney; More reference expression data
BioGPS	More reference expression data
Gene ontology
Molecular function	nucleotide binding; protein-macromolecule adaptor activity; protein domain specific binding; metal ion binding; protein binding; syntaxin binding
Cellular component	HOPS complex; endosome; late endosome; late endosome membrane; membrane; endocytic vesicle; autophagosome; lysosomal membrane; early endosome; lysosome; cytoplasmic vesicle; clathrin-coated vesicle
Biological process	endosomal vesicle fusion; regulation of protein stability; regulation of organelle assembly; positive regulation of protein targeting to mitochondrion; endosome to lysosome transport; autophagy; positive regulation of early endosome to late endosome transport; protein transport; intracellular protein transport; vesicle-mediated transport; regulation of SNARE complex assembly; lysosome organization; endosome organization; vesicle docking involved in exocytosis; transport
Sources:Amigo / QuickGO
Orthologs
Databases	NCBI: entry; OMA: entry
Species	Human	Mouse
Entrez	55823	71732
Ensembl	ENSG00000160695; ENSG00000280616	ENSMUSG00000032127
UniProt	Q9H270	Q91W86
RefSeq (mRNA)	NM_001290185; NM_021729	NM_027889; NM_001357393
RefSeq (protein)	NP_001277114; NP_068375; NP_001365147; NP_001365148; NP_001365149 NP_001365150	NP_082165; NP_001344322
Location (UCSC)	Chr 11: 119.07 – 119.08 Mb	Chr 9: 44.26 – 44.27 Mb
PubMed search
- Wikidata
View/Edit Human	View/Edit Mouse

Vacuolar protein sorting-associated protein 11 homolog is a protein that in humans is encoded by the VPS11 gene.

== Function ==
Vesicle mediated protein sorting plays an important role in segregation of intracellular molecules into distinct organelles. Genetic studies in yeast have identified more than 40 vacuolar protein sorting (VPS) genes involved in vesicle transport to vacuoles. This gene encodes the human homolog of yeast class C Vps11 protein. The mammalian class C Vps proteins are predominantly associated with late endosomes/lysosomes, and like their yeast counterparts, may mediate vesicle trafficking steps in the endosome/lysosome pathway.

== Interactions ==
VPS11 has been shown to interact with VPS18, VPS33A and STX7.
