= Lysosome-associated membrane glycoprotein =

Lysosome-associated membrane glycoprotein (Lamp)

Identifiers
- Symbol: Lamp, LAMP (root symbol of family)
- Pfam: PF01299
- InterPro: IPR002000
- PROSITE: PDOC00280
- TCDB: 9.A.16
- OPM superfamily: 423
- OPM protein: 2mom
- Membranome: 51
Available protein structures:
- PDB: IPR002000 PF01299 (ECOD; PDBsum)
- AlphaFold: IPR002000; PF01299

Lysosome-associated membrane glycoproteins (LAMPs) are integral membrane proteins, specific to lysosomes, and whose exact biological function is not yet clear. Structurally, the lamp proteins consist of two internally homologous lysosome-luminal domains separated by a proline-rich hinge region; at the C-terminal extremity there is a transmembrane region (TM) followed by a very short cytoplasmic tail (C). In each of the duplicated domains, there are two conserved disulfide bonds. This structure is schematically represented in the figure below.

  +-----+            +-----+         +-----+            +-----+
  |     |            |     |         |     |            |     |
 xCxxxxxCxxxxxxxxxxxxCxxxxxCxxxxxxxxxCxxxxxCxxxxxxxxxxxxCxxxxxCxxxxxxxx
 +--------------------------++Hinge++--------------------------++TM++C+

In mammals, there are two closely related types of LAMP: LAMP1 and LAMP2.

CD68 (also called gp110 or macrosialin) is a heavily glycosylated integral membrane protein whose structure consists of a mucin-like domain followed by a proline-rich hinge; a single LAMP-like domain; a transmembrane region and a short cytoplasmic tail.

CD molecules are leucocyte antigens on cell surfaces. CD antigen nomenclature is updated at Protein Reviews On The Web (https://web.archive.org/web/20080920090434/http://mpr.nci.nih.gov/prow/).

== Human proteins containing this domain ==
- CD68
- LAMP1
- LAMP2
- LAMP3
