= CITED1 =

Protein-coding gene in humans

Identifiers
- Aliases: CITED1, MSG1, Cbp/p300 interacting transactivator with Glu/Asp rich carboxy-terminal domain 1
- External IDs: OMIM: 300149; MGI: 108023; HomoloGene: 3057; GeneCards: CITED1; OMA:CITED1 - orthologs

Gene location (Human)
Chr.	X chromosome (human)
Band	Xq13.1	Start	72,301,638 bp
Band	Xq13.1	End	72,307,187 bp

Gene location (Mouse)
Chr.	X chromosome (mouse)
Band	X D|X 45.25 cM	Start	101,290,987 bp
Band	X D|X 45.25 cM	End	101,295,787 bp
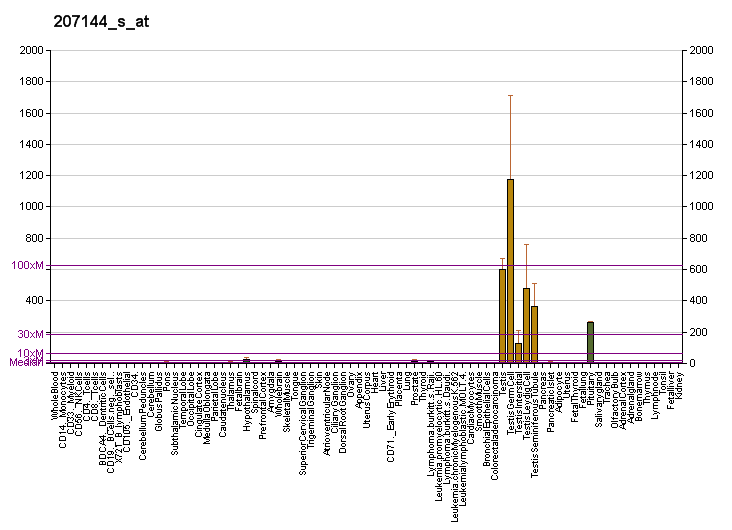
RNA expression pattern
Bgee	Human / Mouse (ortholog); Top expressed in: right testis; left testis; anterior pituitary; hypothalamus; testicle; prefrontal cortex; anterior cingulate cortex; amygdala; dorsolateral prefrontal cortex; superior frontal gyrus / Top expressed in: yolk sac; morula; tail of embryo; reticular formation; atrium; paraxial mesoderm; lactiferous gland; raphe nuclei; endocardium; endocardial cushion; More reference expression data
BioGPS	More reference expression data
Gene ontology
Molecular function	transcription coactivator activity; co-SMAD binding; protein homodimerization activity; DNA-binding transcription factor activity; chromatin binding; LBD domain binding; protein C-terminus binding; protein binding
Cellular component	cytoplasm; cytosol; nucleus; nucleoplasm
Biological process	negative regulation of neuron apoptotic process; response to transforming growth factor beta; positive regulation of transforming growth factor beta receptor signaling pathway; cell differentiation; response to cytokine; melanin biosynthetic process; spongiotrophoblast layer development; response to interleukin-1; regulation of transcription, DNA-templated; SMAD protein signal transduction; response to interleukin-4; response to interferon-gamma; response to interleukin-6; placenta development; regulation of transcription by RNA polymerase II; response to interleukin-2; negative regulation of mesenchymal to epithelial transition involved in metanephros morphogenesis; labyrinthine layer development; response to interleukin-11; negative regulation of Wnt signaling pathway; embryonic axis specification; negative regulation of osteoblast differentiation; transcription, DNA-templated; response to estrogen; vasculogenesis; positive regulation of transcription, DNA-templated; response to insulin; multicellular organism development; response to lipopolysaccharide; branching involved in ureteric bud morphogenesis; brain development; positive regulation of gene expression; response to parathyroid hormone; nucleocytoplasmic transport; pigmentation; response to cAMP; cell population proliferation; metanephros development; melanocyte differentiation; negative regulation of transcription, DNA-templated; response to interleukin-9; transforming growth factor beta receptor signaling pathway; mesenchymal to epithelial transition; apoptotic process; positive regulation of transcription by RNA polymerase II; regulation of apoptotic process; transcription by RNA polymerase II; positive regulation of mesenchymal stem cell proliferation
Sources:Amigo / QuickGO
Orthologs
Species	Human	Mouse
Entrez	4435	12705
Ensembl	ENSG00000125931	ENSMUSG00000051159
UniProt	Q99966	P97769
RefSeq (mRNA)	NM_001144885; NM_001144886; NM_001144887; NM_004143	NM_001276466; NM_001276473; NM_001276474; NM_007709
RefSeq (protein)	NP_001138357; NP_001138358; NP_001138359; NP_004134	NP_001263395; NP_001263402; NP_001263403; NP_031735
Location (UCSC)	Chr X: 72.3 – 72.31 Mb	Chr X: 101.29 – 101.3 Mb
PubMed search
- Wikidata
View/Edit Human	View/Edit Mouse

Cbp/p300-interacting transactivator 1 is a protein that in humans is encoded by the CITED1 gene.

== Interactions ==
CITED1 has been shown to interact with HSPA8 and EP300.
