= VPS33A =

Protein-coding gene in the species Homo sapiens

Identifiers
- Aliases: VPS33A, CORVET/HOPS core subunit
- External IDs: OMIM: 610034; MGI: 1924823; GeneCards: VPS33A
Available structures
PDB	Ortholog search: PDBe RCSB
PDB	List of PDB id codes 4BX8, 4BX9

Gene location (Mouse)
Chr.	Chromosome 5 (mouse)
Band	5 F|5 63.03 cM	Start	123,666,722 bp
Band	5 F|5 63.03 cM	End	123,711,101 bp
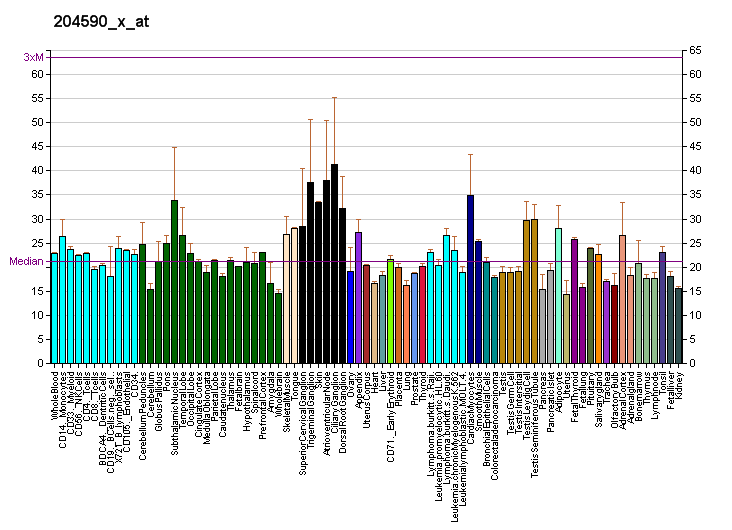
RNA expression pattern
Bgee	Human / Mouse (ortholog); n/a / Top expressed in: greater petrosal nerve; dentate gyrus of hippocampal formation granule cell; primary visual cortex; superior frontal gyrus; supraoptic nucleus; trigeminal ganglion; muscle of thigh; substantia nigra; Region I of hippocampus proper; cerebellar cortex
BioGPS	More reference expression data
Gene ontology
Molecular function	protein binding
Cellular component	HOPS complex; AP-3 adaptor complex; endosome; late endosome; membrane; late endosome membrane; clathrin complex; lysosomal membrane; early endosome; perinuclear region of cytoplasm; lysosome; cytoplasmic vesicle; clathrin-coated vesicle; autophagosome
Biological process	endosome to lysosome transport; platelet formation; melanosome localization; vesicle docking involved in exocytosis; autophagy; autophagosome maturation; lysosome localization; protein transport; regulation of developmental pigmentation; vesicle-mediated transport; regulation of lysosomal lumen pH; transport
Sources:Amigo / QuickGO
Orthologs
Databases	NCBI: entry; OMA: entry
Species	Human	Mouse
Entrez	65082	77573
Ensembl	ENSG00000139719	ENSMUSG00000029434
UniProt	Q96AX1	Q9D2N9
RefSeq (mRNA)	NM_022916	NM_029929; NM_001359513
RefSeq (protein)	NP_075067; NP_001337947; NP_001337948; NP_001337949; NP_001337950	NP_084205; NP_001346442
Location (UCSC)	n/a	Chr 5: 123.67 – 123.71 Mb
PubMed search
- Wikidata
View/Edit Human	View/Edit Mouse

Vacuolar protein sorting-associated protein 33A is a protein that in humans is encoded by the VPS33A gene.

== Function ==
Vesicle mediated protein sorting plays an important role in segregation of intracellular molecules into distinct organelles. Genetic studies in yeast have identified more than 40 vacuolar protein sorting (VPS) genes involved in vesicle transport to vacuoles. This gene is a member of the Sec-1 domain family, and it encodes a protein similar to the yeast class C Vps33 protein. The mammalian class C VPS proteins are predominantly associated with late endosomes/lysosomes, and like their yeast counterparts, may mediate vesicle trafficking steps in the endosome/lysosome pathway.

== Interactions ==
VPS33A has been shown to interact with VPS11.

== Clinical ==
A syndrome has been described that appears to be associated with mutations in this gene. This syndrome has since been named Mucopolysaccharidosis-plus syndrome.
