= CD68 =

Mammalian protein found in humans

Identifiers
- Aliases: CD68, GP110, LAMP4, SCARD1, CD68 molecule
- External IDs: OMIM: 153634; MGI: 88342; GeneCards: CD68

Gene location (Human)
Chr.	Chromosome 17 (human)
Band	17p13.1	Start	7,579,491 bp
Band	17p13.1	End	7,582,111 bp

Gene location (Mouse)
Chr.	Chromosome 11 (mouse)
Band	11 B3|11 42.86 cM	Start	69,555,039 bp
Band	11 B3|11 42.86 cM	End	69,556,979 bp
RNA expression pattern
Bgee	Human / Mouse (ortholog); Top expressed in: white blood cell; monocyte; granulocyte; duodenum; appendix; stromal cell of endometrium; gallbladder; placenta; right lung; lymph node / Top expressed in: stroma of bone marrow; calvaria; decidua; granulocyte; spleen; body of femur; ankle; tibiofemoral joint; right lung lobe; mesenteric lymph nodes; More reference expression data
BioGPS	n/a
Orthologs
Databases	NCBI: entry; OMA: entry
Species	Human	Mouse
Entrez	968	12514
Ensembl	ENSG00000129226	ENSMUSG00000018774
UniProt	P34810	P31996
RefSeq (mRNA)	NM_001251; NM_001040059	NM_001291058; NM_009853
RefSeq (protein)	NP_001035148; NP_001242	NP_001277987
Location (UCSC)	Chr 17: 7.58 – 7.58 Mb	Chr 11: 69.56 – 69.56 Mb
PubMed search
- Wikidata
View/Edit Human	View/Edit Mouse

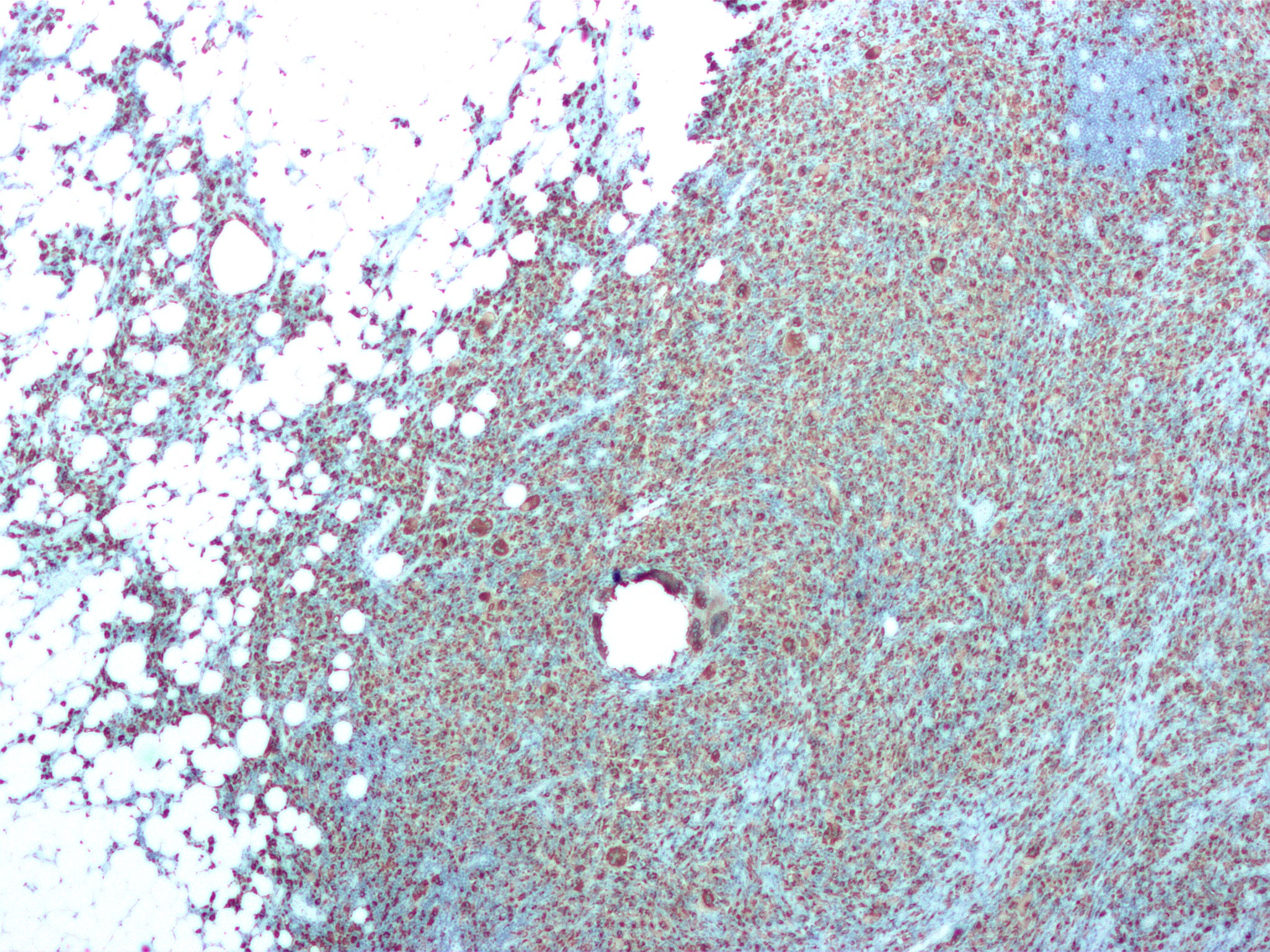
CD68 immunostaining demonstrating macrophages and giant cells in a case of xanthogranulomatous pyelonephritis

CD68 (Cluster of Differentiation 68) is a protein highly expressed by cells in the monocyte lineage (e.g., monocytic phagocytes, osteoclasts), by circulating macrophages, and by tissue macrophages (e.g., Kupffer cells, microglia).

== Structure and function ==
Human CD68 is a Type I transmembrane glycoprotein, heavily glycosylated in its extracellular domain, with a molecular weight of 110 kD. Its primary sequence consists of 354 amino acids with predicted molecular weight of 37.4 kD if it were not glycosylated. The human CD68 protein is encoded by the CD68 gene which maps to chromosome 17. Other names or aliases for this gene in humans and other animals include: CD68 Molecule, CD68 Antigen, GP110, Macrosialin, Scavenger Receptor Class D, Member 1, SCARD1, and LAMP4. The mouse equivalent is known as "macrosialin".

CD68 is functionally and evolutionarily related to other gene/protein family members, including:

- the hematopoietic mucin-like family of molecules that includes leukosialin/CD43 and stem cell antigen CD34;
- the lysosome-associated membrane glycoprotein (LAMP) family (CD68 localizes primarily to lysosomes and endosomes, but with a smaller fraction circulating to the cell surface);
- the scavenger receptor family, whose members typically function to clear cellular debris, promote phagocytosis, and mediate the recruitment and activation of macrophages.

== Use in pathology and research ==
Immunohistochemistry can be used to identify the presence of CD68, which is found in the cytoplasmic granules of a range of different blood cells and myocytes. It is particularly useful as a marker for the various cells of the macrophage lineage, including monocytes, histiocytes, giant cells, Kupffer cells, and osteoclasts. This allows it to be used to distinguish diseases of otherwise similar appearance, such as the monocyte/macrophage and lymphoid forms of leukaemia (the latter being CD68 negative). Its presence in macrophages also makes it useful in diagnosing conditions related to proliferation or abnormality of these cells, such as malignant histiocytosis, histiocytic lymphoma, and Gaucher's disease.

Anti-CD68 monoclonal antibodies that react with tissues of rodent and other species include ED1, FA-11, KP1 (a.k.a. C68/684), 6A326, 6F3, 12E2, 10B1909, and SPM130. Monoclonals that react with humans include, Ki-M7, PG-M1, 514H12, ABM53F5, 3F7C6, 3F7D3, Y1/82A, EPR20545, CDLA68-1, LAMP4-824.

=== ED1 ===
ED1 is the most widely used monoclonal antibody clone directed against the rat CD68 protein and is used to identify macrophages, Kupffer cells, osteoclasts, monocytes, and activated microglia in rat tissues. In this species, it is expressed in most macrophage populations and thus ED1 is commonly used as a pan-macrophage marker. However, in some cell types it is detectable only when up-regulated, such as activated but not quiescent microglia, and can thus be used as a marker of inflammatory conditions and immune reactions in those instances. Commercial suppliers report that ED1 is used for detection of the CD68 protein by immunohistochemical staining, flow cytometry, and western blot methods and that in addition to rat it cross-reacts with bovine species.

The ED1 anti-CD68 antibody is not to be confused with the fibronectin extra domain ED1.

== See also ==
- Cluster of differentiation
- Lysosome-associated membrane glycoprotein
- Scavenger receptor (immunology)
