= HSPA8 =

Protein-coding gene in the species Homo sapiens

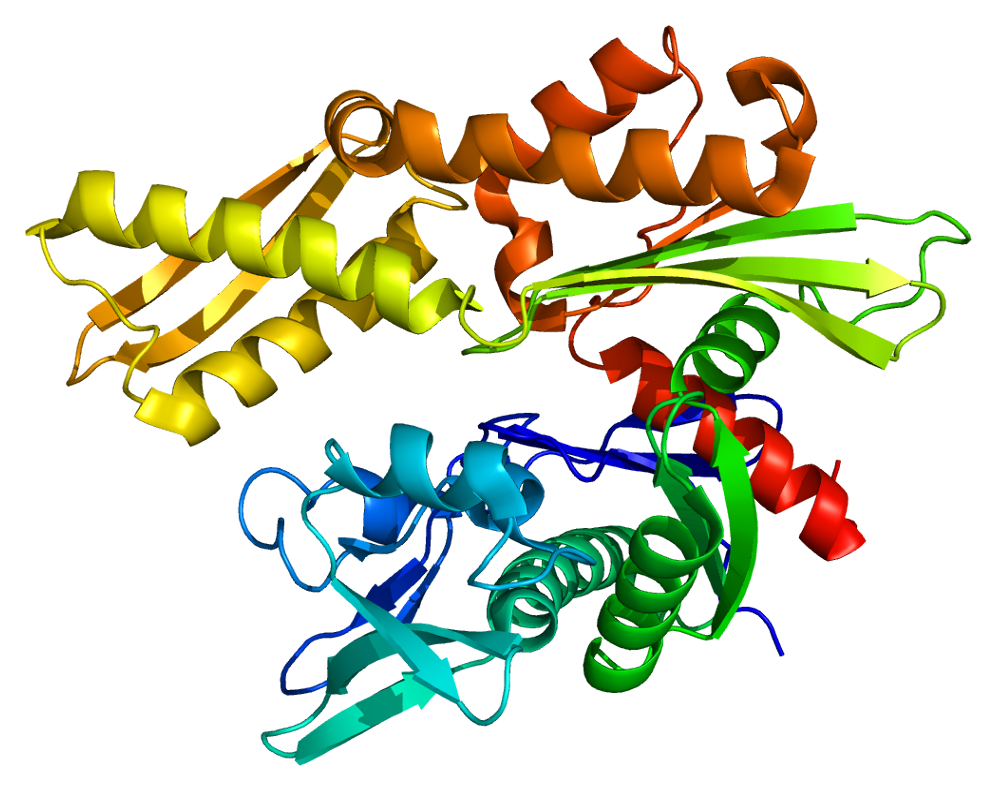

Identifiers
- Aliases: HSPA8, HEL-33, HEL-S-72p, HSC54, HSC70, HSC71, HSP71, HSP73, HSPA10, LAP-1, LAP1, NIP71, heat shock protein family A (Hsp70) member 8
- External IDs: OMIM: 600816; MGI: 105384; GeneCards: HSPA8
Available structures
| PDB | Ortholog search: PDBe RCSB |
| PDB | List of PDB id codes 3AGY, 3AGZ, 3ESK, 3FZF, 3FZH, 3FZK, 3FZL, 3FZM, 4HWI, 3LDQ, 3M3Z, 4H5N, 4H5R, 4H5T, 4H5V, 4H5W, 4KBQ |
Enzyme activity
| EC # | BRENDA | ExPASy | KEGG | MetaCyc |
|---|---|---|---|---|
| 3.6.4.10 | ↗ | ↗ | ↗ | ↗ |

Gene location (Human)
| Chr. | Chromosome 11 (human) |
| Band | 11q24.1 | Start | 123,057,489 bp |
| Band | 11q24.1 | End | 123,063,230 bp |

Gene location (Mouse)
| Chr. | Chromosome 9 (mouse) |
| Band | 9 A5.1|9 21.55 cM | Start | 40,712,280 bp |
| Band | 9 A5.1|9 21.55 cM | End | 40,721,383 bp |
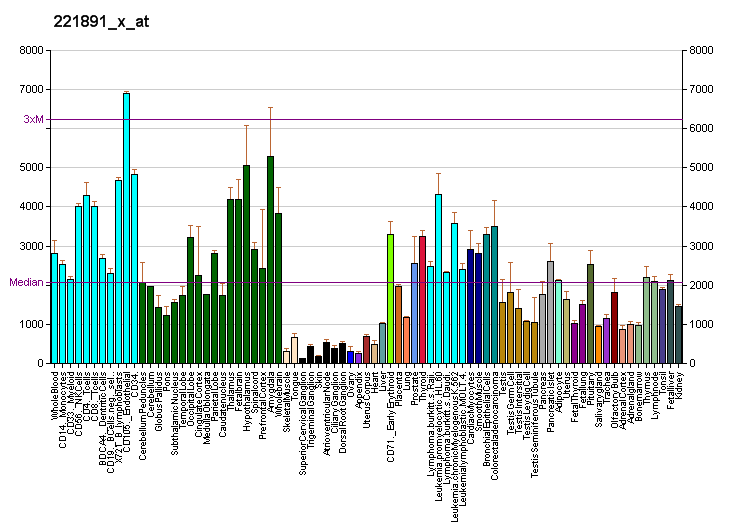

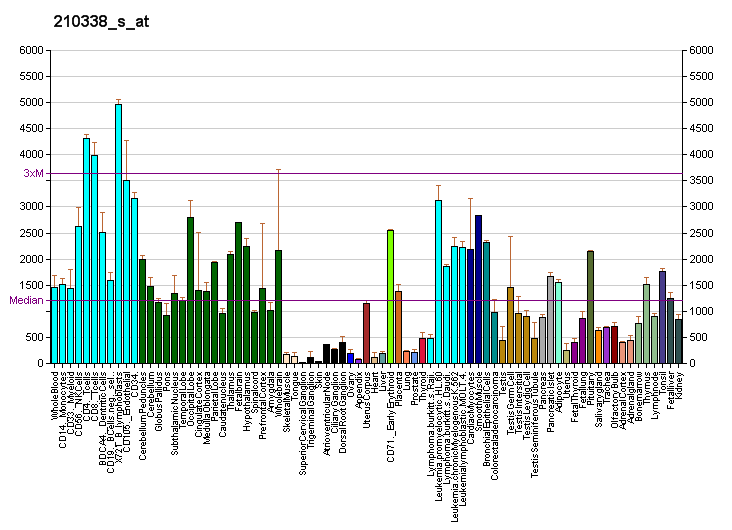

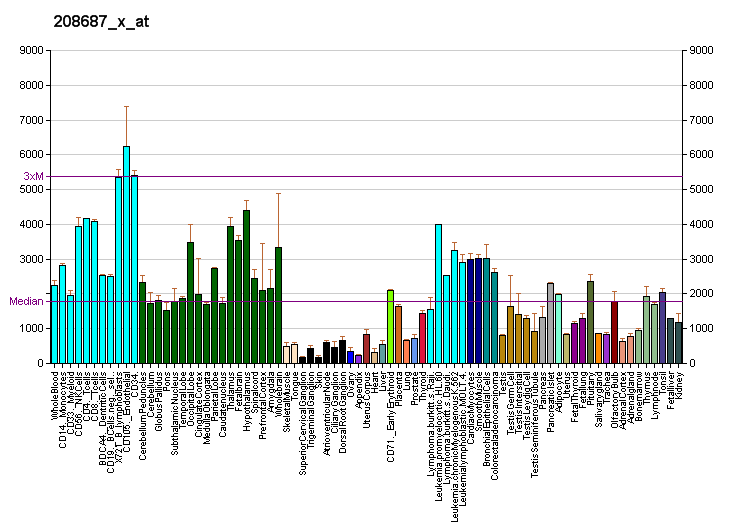
RNA expression pattern
| Bgee | Human / Mouse (ortholog); Top expressed in: corpus callosum; superior frontal gyrus; right hemisphere of cerebellum; prefrontal cortex; right frontal lobe; ventricular zone; gonad; ganglionic eminence; right testis; primary visual cortex / Top expressed in: tail of embryo; genital tubercle; ventricular zone; ganglionic eminence; ovary; mesencephalon; neural tube; right kidney; hippocampus proper; proximal tubule; More reference expression data |
| BioGPS | More reference expression data |
Gene ontology
| Molecular function | nucleotide binding; heat shock protein binding; unfolded protein binding; phosphatidylserine binding; C3HC4-type RING finger domain binding; protein binding; MHC class II protein complex binding; enzyme binding; G protein-coupled receptor binding; ATP binding; ubiquitin protein ligase binding; ATPase activity; RNA binding; cadherin binding; protein-macromolecule adaptor activity; protein folding chaperone activity; chaperone binding; misfolded protein binding; clathrin-uncoating ATPase activity |
| Cellular component | cytoplasm; cytosol; late endosome; blood microparticle; membrane; focal adhesion; ubiquitin ligase complex; melanosome; myelin sheath; plasma membrane; clathrin-sculpted gamma-aminobutyric acid transport vesicle membrane; intracellular anatomical structure; Prp19 complex; nucleoplasm; lysosomal membrane; lysosomal lumen; nucleolus; spliceosomal complex; lumenal side of lysosomal membrane; extracellular exosome; nucleus; presynapse; extracellular matrix; extracellular region; extracellular space; secretory granule lumen; ficolin-1-rich granule lumen; lysosome; autophagosome; axon; dendrite; terminal bouton; presynaptic cytosol; postsynaptic cytosol; chaperone complex; ribonucleoprotein complex |
| Biological process | chaperone-mediated autophagy; mRNA splicing, via spliceosome; late endosomal microautophagy; regulation of transcription, DNA-templated; regulation of protein stability; regulation of mRNA stability; positive regulation of mRNA splicing, via spliceosome; cellular response to starvation; mRNA processing; chaperone-mediated autophagy translocation complex disassembly; transcription, DNA-templated; chaperone cofactor-dependent protein refolding; regulation of cell cycle; regulation of protein complex stability; ATP metabolic process; response to unfolded protein; clathrin coat disassembly; protein folding; protein refolding; regulation of cellular response to heat; viral process; negative regulation of transcription, DNA-templated; neurotransmitter secretion; regulation of protein-containing complex assembly; negative regulation of supramolecular fiber organization; regulation of protein import; RNA splicing; protein methylation; neutrophil degranulation; modulation by host of viral process; positive regulation by host of viral genome replication; membrane organization; protein targeting to lysosome involved in chaperone-mediated autophagy; axo-dendritic transport; vesicle-mediated transport; cytokine-mediated signaling pathway; cellular response to heat; Unfolded protein response; slow axonal transport |
Sources:Amigo / QuickGO
Orthologs
| Databases | NCBI: entry; OMA: entry |
| Species | Human | Mouse |
| Entrez | 3312 | 15481 |
| Ensembl | ENSG00000109971 | ENSMUSG00000015656 |
| UniProt | P11142 | P63017 |
| RefSeq (mRNA) | NM_006597; NM_153201 | NM_031165; NM_001364480 |
| RefSeq (protein) | NP_006588; NP_694881 | NP_112442; NP_001351409 |
| Location (UCSC) | Chr 11: 123.06 – 123.06 Mb | Chr 9: 40.71 – 40.72 Mb |
| PubMed search |
- Wikidata
| View/Edit Human | View/Edit Mouse |

Heat shock 70 kDa protein 8 also known as heat shock cognate 71 kDa protein or Hsc70 or Hsp73 is a heat shock protein that in humans is encoded by the HSPA8 gene on chromosome 11. As a member of the heat shock protein 70 family and a chaperone protein, it facilitates the proper folding of newly translated and misfolded proteins, as well as stabilize or degrade mutant proteins. Its functions contribute to biological processes including signal transduction, apoptosis, autophagy, protein homeostasis, and cell growth and differentiation. It has been associated with an extensive number of cancers, neurodegenerative diseases, cell senescence, and aging.

== Structure ==
This gene encodes a 70kDa heat shock protein which is a member of the heat shock protein 70 (Hsp70) family. As a Hsp70 protein, it has a C-terminal protein substrate-binding domain and an N-terminal ATP-binding domain. The substrate-binding domain consists of two subdomains, a two-layered β-sandwich subdomain (SBDβ) and an α-helical subdomain (SBDα), which are connected by the loop Lα,β. SBDβ contains the peptide binding pocket while SBDα serves as a lid to cover the substrate binding cleft. The ATP binding domain consists of four subdomains split into two lobes by a central ATP/ADP binding pocket. The two terminal domains are linked together by a conserved region referred to as loop LL,1, which is critical for allosteric regulation. The unstructured region at the very end of the C-terminal is believed to be the docking site for co-chaperones.

== Function ==
The heat shock protein 70 (Hsp70) family contains both heat-inducible and constitutively expressed members. The latter are called heat-shock cognate (Hsc) proteins. The heat shock 70 kDa protein 8 also known as Hsc70 belongs to the heat-shock cognate subgroup. This protein binds to nascent polypeptides to facilitate correct protein folding. In order to properly fold non-native proteins, Hsp70 chaperones interact with the hydrophobic peptide segments of proteins in an ATP-controlled fashion. Though the exact mechanism still remains unclear, there are at least two alternative modes of action: kinetic partitioning and local unfolding. In kinetic partitioning, Hsp70s repetitively bind and release substrates in cycles that maintain low concentrations of free substrate. This effectively prevents aggregation while allowing free molecules to fold to the native state. In local unfolding, the binding and release cycles induce localized unfolding in the substrate, which helps to overcome kinetic barriers for folding to the native state. Ultimately, its role in protein folding contributes to its function in signal transduction, apoptosis, protein homeostasis, and cell growth and differentiation. Hsc70 is known to localize to the cytoplasm and lysosome, where it participates in chaperone-mediated autophagy by aiding the unfolding and translocation of substrate proteins across the membrane into the lysosomal lumen. Through this pathway, Hsc70 also contributes to the degradation of the proapoptotic BBC3/PUMA under normal conditions, thus conferring cytoprotection.

Hsc70 additionally serves as a positive regulator of cell cycle transition and carcinogenesis. For example, Hsc70 regulates the nuclear accumulation of cyclin D1, which is a key player in G1 to S phase cell cycle transition.

Another function of Hsc70 is as an ATPase in the disassembly of clathrin-coated vesicles during transport of membrane components through the cell. It works with auxilin to remove clathrin from coated vesicles. In neurons, synaptojanin is also an important protein involved in vesicle uncoating. Hsc70 is a key component of chaperone-mediated autophagy wherein it imparts selectivity to the proteins being degraded by this lysosomal pathway.

=== Hsc70 vs Hsp70 comparison ===
Human Hsc70 has 85% identity with human Hsp70 (SDSC workbench, blosom26 default analysis). The scientific community has long assumed that Hsp70 and Hsc70 have similar cellular roles, but this assumption proved incomplete. While Hsc70 also performed chaperone functions under normal conditions, unlike canonical heat shock proteins, Hsc70 is constitutively expressed and performs functions related to normal cellular processes, such as protein ubiquitylation and degradation.

== Clinical significance ==
The Hsp70 member proteins are important apoptotic constituents. During a normal embryologic processes, or during cell injury (such as ischemia-reperfusion injury during heart attacks and strokes) or during developments and processes in cancer, an apoptotic cell undergoes structural changes including cell shrinkage, plasma membrane blebbing, nuclear condensation, and fragmentation of the DNA and nucleus. This is followed by fragmentation into apoptotic bodies that are quickly removed by phagocytes, thereby preventing an inflammatory response. It is a mode of cell death defined by characteristic morphological, biochemical and molecular changes. It was first described as a "shrinkage necrosis", and then this term was replaced by apoptosis to emphasize its role opposite mitosis in tissue kinetics. In later stages of apoptosis the entire cell becomes fragmented, forming a number of plasma membrane-bounded apoptotic bodies which contain nuclear and or cytoplasmic elements. The ultrastructural appearance of necrosis is quite different, the main features being mitochondrial swelling, plasma membrane breakdown and cellular disintegration. Apoptosis occurs in many physiological and pathological processes. It plays an important role during embryonal development as programmed cell death and accompanies a variety of normal involutional processes in which it serves as a mechanism to remove "unwanted" cells.

Hsp70 member proteins, including Hsp72, inhibit apoptosis by acting on the caspase-dependent pathway and against apoptosis-inducing agents such as tumor necrosis factor-α (TNFα), staurosporine, and doxorubicin. This role leads to its involvement in many pathological processes, such as oncogenesis, neurodegeneration, and senescence. In particular, overexpression of HSP72 has been linked to the development some cancers, such as hepatocellular carcinoma, gastric cancers, colon cancers, breast cancers, and lung cancers, which led to its use as a prognostic marker for these cancers. Elevated Hsp70 levels in tumor cells may increase malignancy and resistance to therapy by complexing, and hence, stabilizing, oncofetal proteins and products and transporting them into intracellular sites, thereby promoting tumor cell proliferation. As a result, tumor vaccine strategies for Hsp70s have been highly successful in animal models and progressed to clinical trials. One treatment, a Hsp72/AFP recombined vaccine, elicited robust protective immunity against AFP-expressing tumors in mice experiments. Therefore, the vaccine holds promise for treating hepatocellular carcinoma. Alternatively, overexpression of Hsp70 can mitigate damage from ischemia-reperfusion in cardiac muscle, as well damage from neurodegenerative diseases, such as Alzheimer's disease, Parkinson's disease, Huntington's disease, and spinocerebellar ataxias, and aging and cell senescence, as observed in centenarians subjected to heat shock challenge. In particular, Hsc70 plays a protective role in the aforementioned diseases, as well as in other neuropsychiatric disorders such as schizophrenia. Its protective role was further highlighted in a study that identified HSPA8 alongside other HSP70 proteins in a core sub-network of the wider chaperome interactome that functions as a proteostasis safeguard and that is repressed in aging brains and in the brains of Alzheimer's, Parkinson's and Huntington's disease patients.

== Interactions ==
Hsc70 forms a chaperone complex by interacting with the heat shock protein of 40 kDa (Hsp40), the heat shock protein of 90 kDa (Hsp90), the hsc70-interacting protein (HIP), the hsc70-hsp90 organizing protein (HOP), and the Bcl2-associated athanogene 1 protein (BAG1).

HSPA8 has also been shown to interact with:

- BBC Three,
- BAG1,
- BAG2,
- BAG3,
- BAG4,
- CDC5L,
- CITED1,
- CCND1,
- DNAJA3,
- GJA1,
- HSPBP1,
- PARK2, and
- STUB1.
