= CA77.1 =

Chemical compound

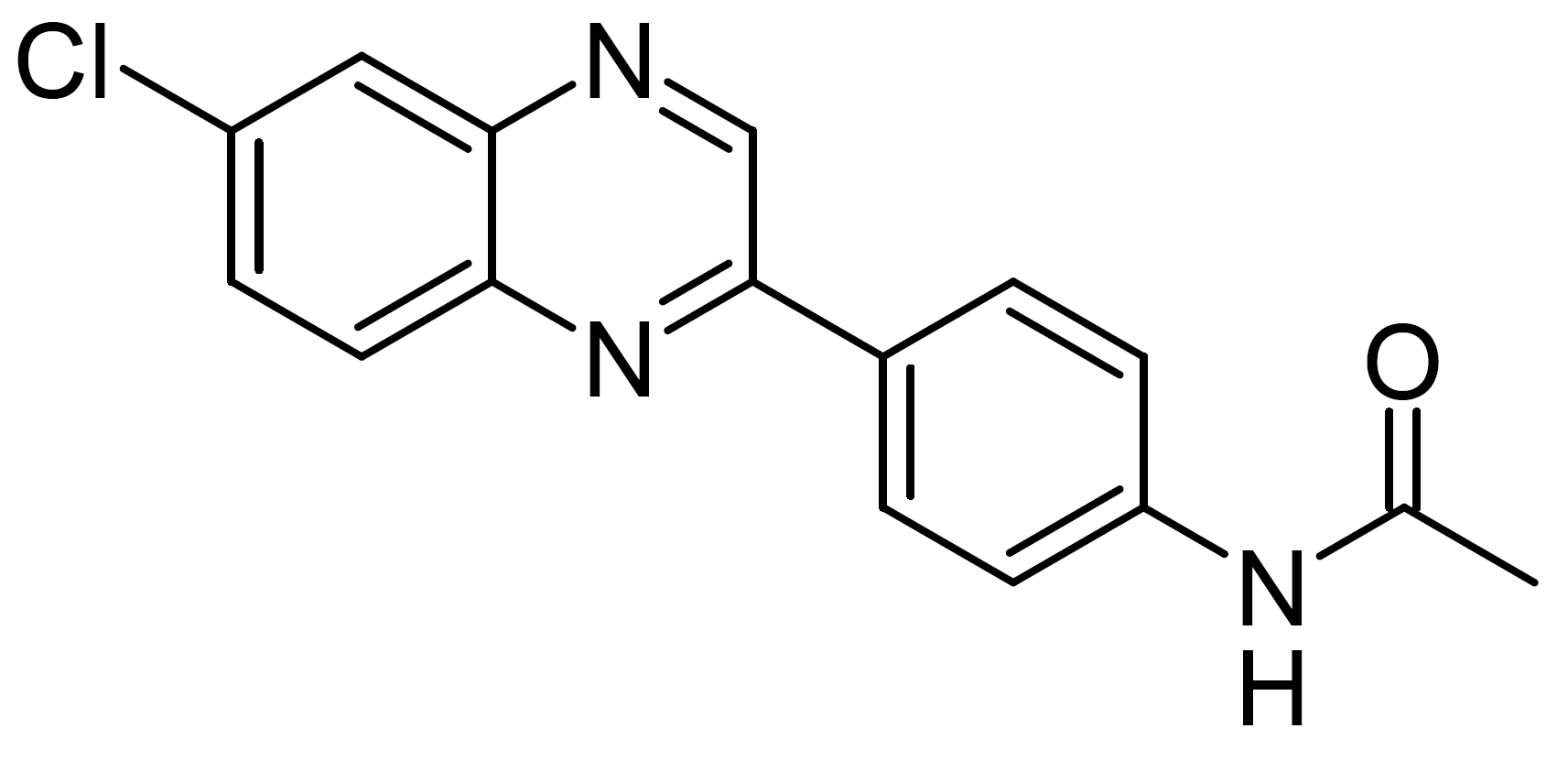

Identifiers
- IUPAC name: N-[4-(6-chloroquinoxalin-2-yl)phenyl]acetamide
- CAS Number: 2412270-22-3
- PubChem CID: 146439211
- ChemSpider: 114641988
- CompTox Dashboard (EPA): DTXSID701336851

Chemical and physical data
- Formula: C_{16}H_{12}ClN_{3}O
- Molar mass: 297.74 g·mol^{−1}
- 3D model (JSmol): Interactive image
- SMILES: CC(=O)NC1=CC=C(C=C1)C2=CN=C3C=C(C=CC3=N2)Cl
- InChI: InChI=1S/C16H12ClN3O/c1-10(21)19-13-5-2-11(3-6-13)16-9-18-15-8-12(17)4-7-14(15)20-16/h2-9H,1H3,(H,19,21); Key:ZQXMPDVGBWOTBY-UHFFFAOYSA-N

CA77.1 (CA) is a synthetic compound that activates chaperone-mediated autophagy (CMA) by increasing the expression of the lysosomal receptor for this pathway, LAMP2A, in lysosomes. CA77.1 is a derivative of earlier compound AR7(HY-101106), which shows potent CMA activation in vitro but is not suitable for in vivo use. CA77.1 is able to activate CMA in vivo, and demonstrates brain penetrance and favorable pharmacokinetics. It has been shown in animal studies that in vivo administration of CA77.1 to enhance chaperone-mediated autophagy, may help to degrade toxic pathogenic protein products such as tau proteins and has potential applications in the treatment of Alzheimer's disease particularly in improving both behavior and neuropathology in PS19 mice models.
