= VPS18 =

Protein-coding gene in the species Homo sapiens

Identifiers
- Aliases: VPS18, PEP3, CORVET/HOPS core subunit, VPS18 core subunit of CORVET and HOPS complexes
- External IDs: OMIM: 608551; MGI: 2443626; GeneCards: VPS18

Gene location (Human)
Chr.	Chromosome 15 (human)
Band	15q15.1	Start	40,894,450 bp
Band	15q15.1	End	40,903,975 bp

Gene location (Mouse)
Chr.	Chromosome 2 (mouse)
Band	2|2 E5	Start	119,119,221 bp
Band	2|2 E5	End	119,128,934 bp
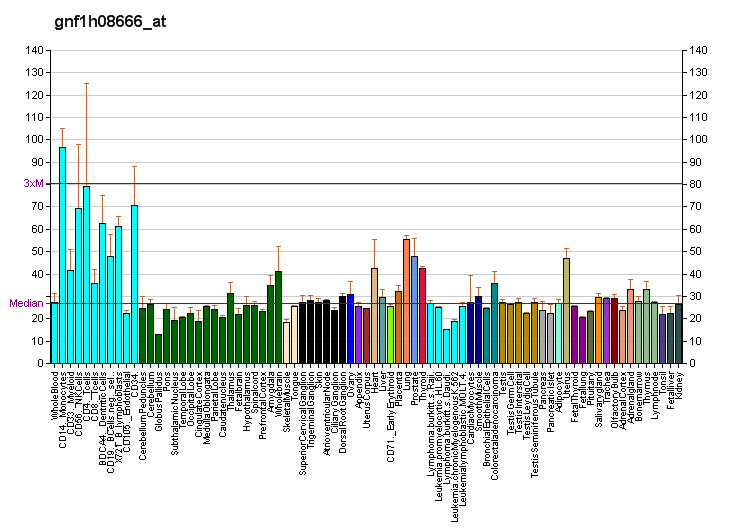
RNA expression pattern
Bgee	Human / Mouse (ortholog); Top expressed in: pancreatic ductal cell; tendon of biceps brachii; stromal cell of endometrium; apex of heart; tibialis anterior muscle; blood; muscle of thigh; islet of Langerhans; prefrontal cortex; white blood cell / Top expressed in: ankle joint; neural layer of retina; granulocyte; yolk sac; stroma of bone marrow; primary visual cortex; superior frontal gyrus; right kidney; dentate gyrus of hippocampal formation granule cell; muscle of thigh; More reference expression data
BioGPS	More reference expression data
Gene ontology
Molecular function	protein-macromolecule adaptor activity; metal ion binding; protein binding; actin binding; syntaxin binding
Cellular component	HOPS complex; AP-3 adaptor complex; endosome; late endosome; membrane; late endosome membrane; autophagosome; lysosomal membrane; early endosome; actin filament; CORVET complex; lysosome; cytoplasmic vesicle; clathrin-coated vesicle; presynapse; glutamatergic synapse
Biological process	endosome to lysosome transport; endosome organization; autophagy; protein transport; viral entry into host cell; intracellular protein transport; lysosome organization; vesicle-mediated transport; vesicle docking involved in exocytosis; regulation of SNARE complex assembly; transport; regulation of synaptic vesicle exocytosis; vacuole organization
Sources:Amigo / QuickGO
Orthologs
Databases	NCBI: entry; OMA: entry
Species	Human	Mouse
Entrez	57617	228545
Ensembl	ENSG00000104142	ENSMUSG00000034216
UniProt	Q9P253	Q8R307
RefSeq (mRNA)	NM_020857	NM_172269
RefSeq (protein)	NP_065908; NP_065908.1	NP_758473
Location (UCSC)	Chr 15: 40.89 – 40.9 Mb	Chr 2: 119.12 – 119.13 Mb
PubMed search
- Wikidata
View/Edit Human	View/Edit Mouse

Vacuolar protein sorting-associated protein 18 homolog is a protein that in humans is encoded by the VPS18 gene.

== Function ==
Vesicle mediated protein sorting plays an important role in segregation of intracellular molecules into distinct organelles. Genetic studies in yeast have identified more than 40 vacuolar protein sorting (VPS) genes involved in vesicle transport to vacuoles. This gene encodes the human homolog of yeast class C Vps18 protein. The mammalian class C Vps proteins are predominantly associated with late endosomes/lysosomes, and like their yeast counterparts, may mediate vesicle trafficking steps in the endosome/lysosome pathway.

== Interactions ==
VPS18 has been shown to interact with VPS11 and STX7.
