= LAMP1 =

Protein-coding gene in humans

Identifiers
- Aliases: LAMP1, CD107a, LAMPA, LGP120, lysosomal associated membrane protein 1
- External IDs: OMIM: 153330; MGI: 96745; GeneCards: LAMP1

Gene location (Human)
Chr.	Chromosome 13 (human)
Band	13q34	Start	113,297,239 bp
Band	13q34	End	113,323,672 bp

Gene location (Mouse)
Chr.	Chromosome 8 (mouse)
Band	8 A1.1|8 5.73 cM	Start	13,209,161 bp
Band	8 A1.1|8 5.73 cM	End	13,225,338 bp
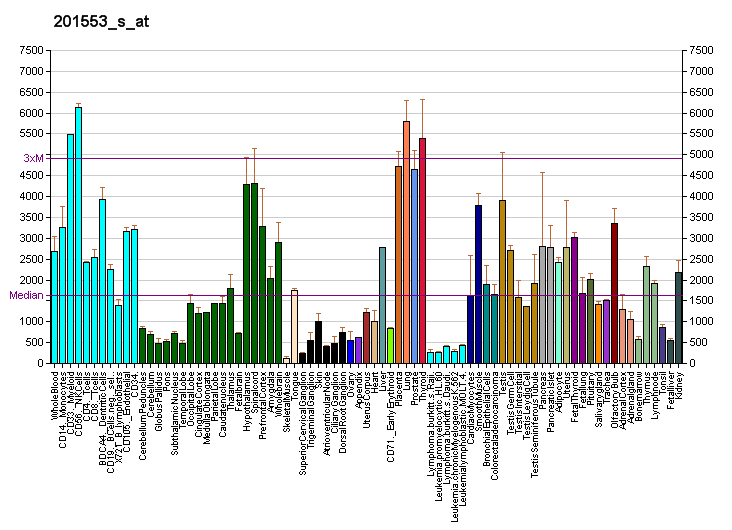

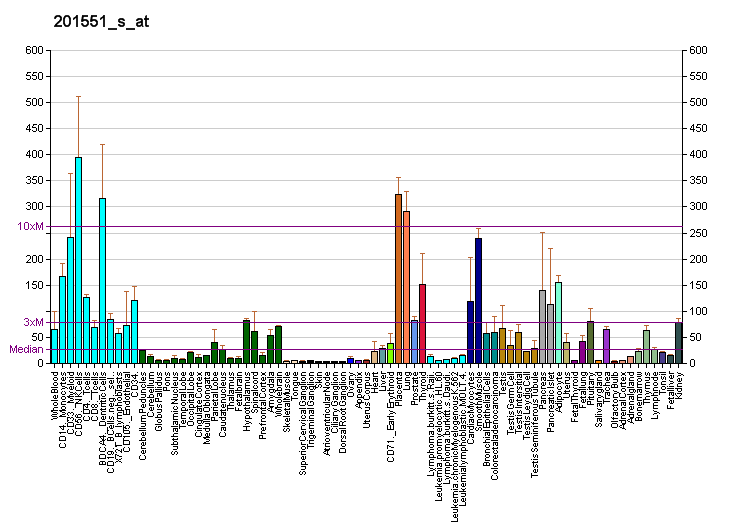

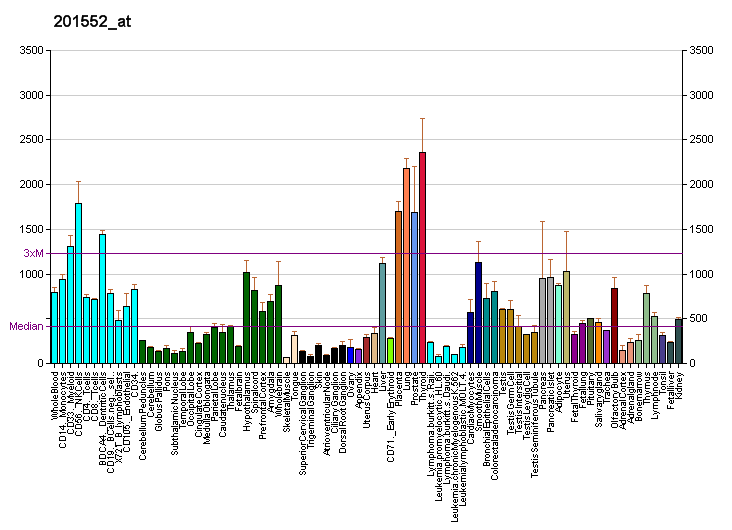
RNA expression pattern
Bgee	Human / Mouse (ortholog); Top expressed in: endothelial cell; visceral pleura; parotid gland; inferior olivary nucleus; dorsal motor nucleus of vagus nerve; glomerulus; kidney tubule; metanephric glomerulus; gingival epithelium; pancreatic ductal cell / Top expressed in: stroma of bone marrow; vestibular membrane of cochlear duct; calvaria; right kidney; lactiferous gland; spermatocyte; sciatic nerve; mesenteric lymph nodes; molar; carotid body; More reference expression data
BioGPS	More reference expression data
Gene ontology
Molecular function	protein domain specific binding; virus receptor activity; protein binding; enzyme binding
Cellular component	integral component of membrane; multivesicular body; phagolysosome membrane; vesicle; endosome; late endosome; membrane; synaptic vesicle; cytolytic granule; melanosome; integral component of plasma membrane; alveolar lamellar body; cell surface; lysosomal membrane; soma; vacuole; dendrite; phagocytic vesicle; perinuclear region of cytoplasm; sarcolemma; lysosome; endosome membrane; extracellular exosome; cytoplasmic vesicle; external side of plasma membrane; cytosol; cytoplasm; plasma membrane; azurophil granule membrane; autolysosome; ficolin-1-rich granule membrane; integral component of synaptic vesicle membrane; late endosome membrane
Biological process	protein stabilization; Golgi to lysosome transport; positive regulation of natural killer cell degranulation; regulation of organelle transport along microtubule; viral entry into host cell; viral process; establishment of protein localization to organelle; positive regulation of natural killer cell mediated cytotoxicity; granzyme-mediated apoptotic signaling pathway; autophagic cell death; neutrophil degranulation
Sources:Amigo / QuickGO
Orthologs
Databases	NCBI: entry; OMA: entry
Species	Human	Mouse
Entrez	3916	16783
Ensembl	ENSG00000185896	ENSMUSG00000031447
UniProt	P11279	P11438
RefSeq (mRNA)	NM_005561	NM_010684; NM_001317353
RefSeq (protein)	NP_005552	NP_001304282; NP_034814
Location (UCSC)	Chr 13: 113.3 – 113.32 Mb	Chr 8: 13.21 – 13.23 Mb
PubMed search
- Wikidata
View/Edit Human	View/Edit Mouse

Lysosomal-associated membrane protein 1 (LAMP-1) also known as lysosome-associated membrane glycoprotein 1 and CD107a (Cluster of Differentiation 107a), is a protein that in humans is encoded by the LAMP1 gene. The human LAMP1 gene is located on the long arm (q) of chromosome 13 at region 3, band 4 (13q34).

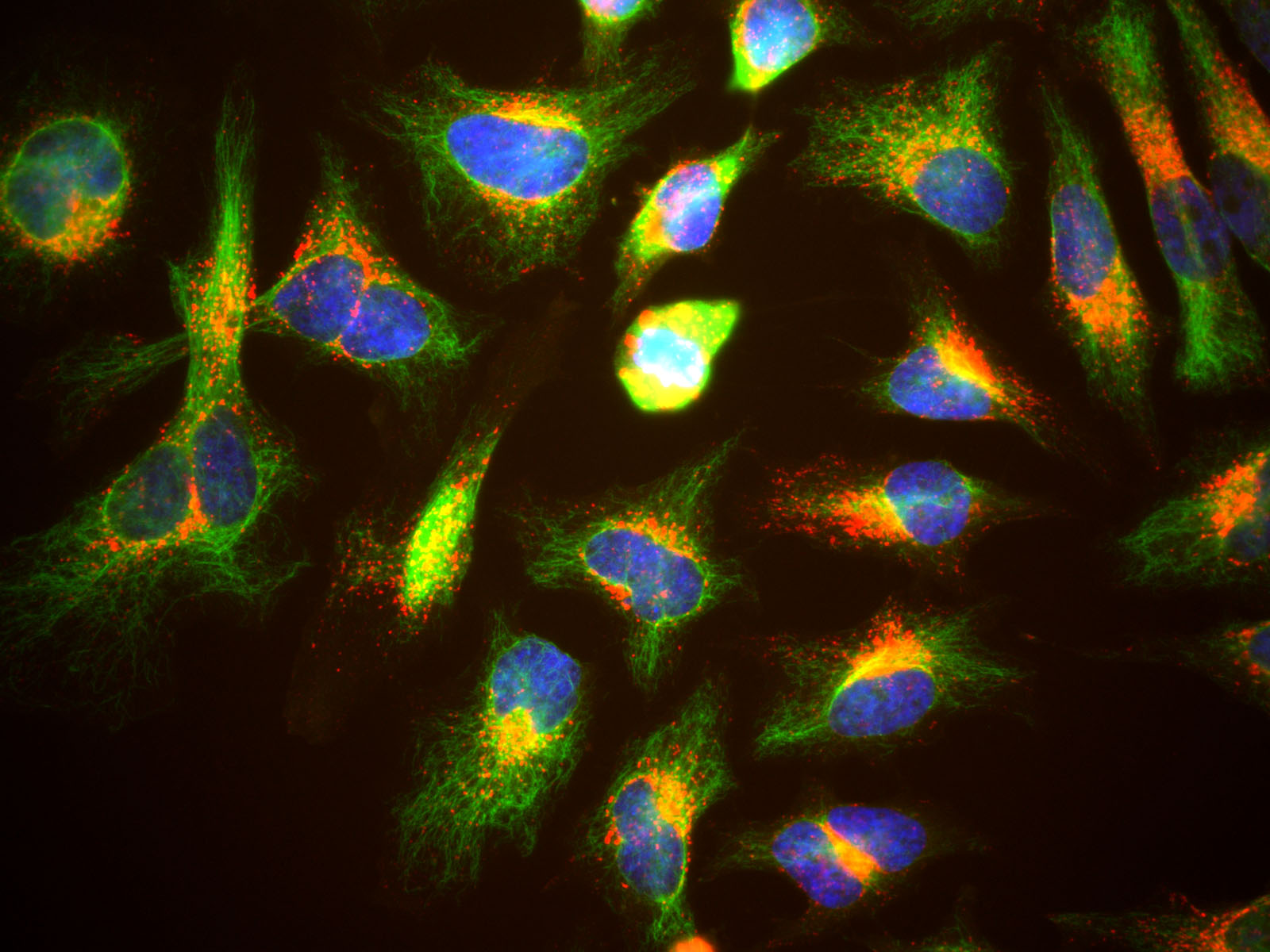
Immunofluorescence staining of HeLa Cells with antibody to reveal lysosomal LAMP1 in red and vimentin containing intermediate filaments in green. Nuclear DNA is seen in blue. Antibodies and image courtesy EnCor Biotechnology Inc.

Lysosomal-associated membrane protein 1 is a glycoprotein from a family of Lysosome-associated membrane glycoproteins. The LAMP-1 glycoprotein is a type I transmembrane protein which is expressed at high or medium levels in at least 76 different normal tissue cell types. It resides primarily across lysosomal membranes, and functions to provide selectins with carbohydrate ligands. CD107a has also been shown to be a marker of degranulation on lymphocytes such as CD8+ and NK cells, and may also play a role in tumor cell differentiation and metastasis.

== Structure ==
Residing primarily across lysosomal membranes, these glycoproteins consist of a large, highly glycosylated end with N-linked carbon chains on the luminal side of the membrane, and a short C-terminal tail exposed to the cytoplasm. The extracytoplasmic region contains a hinge-like structure which can form disulphide bridges homologous to those observed in human immunoglobulin A. Other characteristics of the structure of the LAMP-1 glycoproteins include:

- A polypeptide core of ~40 kDa
- 18 {N-glycosylation} sites to help with the addition of sugar chains
- Polylactosamine attachments which protect the glyocoprotein from degradation by lysosomal proteases
- Significant quantities of polylactosaminoglycan and sialic acid to traverse the trans-Golgi cisternae.
- poly-N-acetyllactosamine groups which are involved in interactions with selectin and other glycan-binding proteins

== Function ==
LAMP1 and LAMP2 glycoproteins comprise 50% of all lysosomal membrane proteins, and are thought to be responsible in part for maintaining lysosomal integrity, pH and catabolism. The expression of LAMP1 and LAMP2 glycoproteins are linked, as deficiencies in LAMP1 gene will lead to increased expression of LAMP2 glycoproteins. The two are therefore thought to share similar functions in vivo. However, this makes the determining the precise function of LAMP1 difficult, because while the LAMP1 deficient phenotype is little different than the wild type due to LAMP2 up regulation, the LAMP1/LAMP2 double deficient phenotype leads to embryonic lethality.

Although the LAMP1 glycoproteins primarily reside across lysosomal membranes, in certain cases they can be expressed across the plasma membrane of the cell. Expression of LAMP1 at the cell surface can occur due to lysosomal fusion with the cell membrane. Cell surface expression of LAMP1 can serve as a ligand for selectins and help mediate cell-cell adhesion. Accordingly, cell surface expression of LAMP1 is seen in cells with migratory or invasive functions, such as cytotoxic T cells, platelets and macrophages. Cell surface expression of LAMP1 and LAMP2 is also often seen in cancer cells, particularly cancers with high metastatic potential, such as colon carcinoma and melanoma, and has been shown to correlate with their metastatic potential.

== Role in cancer ==
LAMP1 expression on the surface of tumor cells has been observed for a number of different cancer types, particularly in highly metastatic cancers such as pancreatic cancer, colon cancer and melanoma. The structure of LAMP1 correlates with differentiation and metastatic potential of tumor cells as it is thought to help mediate cell-cell adhesion and migration. Indeed, the adhesion of some cancer cells to the extracellular matrix is mediated by interactions between LAMP1 and LAMP2 and E-selectin and galectins, with the LAMPs serving as ligands for the cell-adhesion molecules.

Cell membrane expression of LAMP-1 observed in the following cancer types:

- Human fibrosarcoma,
- Colon adenocarcinoma,
- Melanoma,
- Pancreatic adenocarcinoma, and
- Astrocytoma.

== See also ==
- Cluster of differentiation
