= BAG2 =

Protein-coding gene in the species Homo sapiens

Identifiers
- Aliases: BAG2, BAG-2, dJ417I1.2, BCL2 associated athanogene 2, BAG cochaperone 2
- External IDs: OMIM: 603882; MGI: 1891254; GeneCards: BAG2
Available structures
PDB	Ortholog search: PDBe RCSB
PDB	List of PDB id codes 3CQX, 3D0T

Gene location (Human)
Chr.	Chromosome 6 (human)
Band	6p12.1	Start	57,172,326 bp
Band	6p12.1	End	57,189,833 bp

Gene location (Mouse)
Chr.	Chromosome 1 (mouse)
Band	1|1 B	Start	33,784,565 bp
Band	1|1 B	End	33,796,876 bp
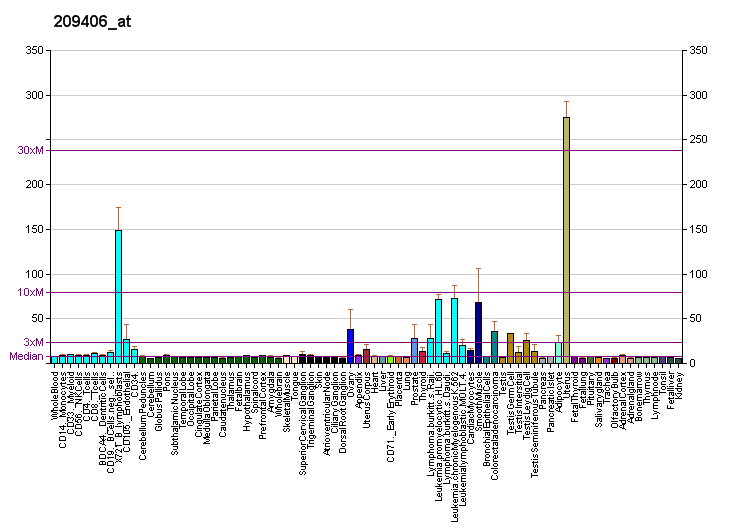
RNA expression pattern
Bgee	Human / Mouse (ortholog); Top expressed in: tail of epididymis; right ventricle; biceps brachii; Skeletal muscle tissue of biceps brachii; saphenous vein; seminal vesicula; smooth muscle tissue; thoracic diaphragm; muscle layer of sigmoid colon; Skeletal muscle tissue of rectus abdominis / Top expressed in: interventricular septum; cardiac muscle tissue of left ventricle; yolk sac; right ventricle; extraocular muscle; entorhinal cortex; perirhinal cortex; temporal muscle; digastric muscle; lumbar spinal ganglion; More reference expression data
BioGPS	More reference expression data
Gene ontology
Molecular function	chaperone binding; protein binding; identical protein binding; adenyl-nucleotide exchange factor activity; heat shock protein binding; ubiquitin protein ligase binding; transmembrane transporter binding; tau protein binding
Cellular component	cytosol; microtubule; axon; dendrite; chaperone complex; dendritic microtubule
Biological process	regulation of cellular response to heat; protein metabolic process; protein folding; regulation of catalytic activity; positive regulation of protein processing; negative regulation of protein ubiquitination; negative regulation of protein binding; positive regulation of proteasomal ubiquitin-dependent protein catabolic process; protein stabilization; positive regulation of proteasomal protein catabolic process; negative regulation of ubiquitin protein ligase activity
Sources:Amigo / QuickGO
Orthologs
Databases	NCBI: entry; OMA: entry
Species	Human	Mouse
Entrez	9532	213539
Ensembl	ENSG00000112208	ENSMUSG00000042215
UniProt	O95816	Q91YN9
RefSeq (mRNA)	NM_004282	NM_145392
RefSeq (protein)	NP_004273	NP_663367
Location (UCSC)	Chr 6: 57.17 – 57.19 Mb	Chr 1: 33.78 – 33.8 Mb
PubMed search
- Wikidata
View/Edit Human	View/Edit Mouse

BAG family molecular chaperone regulator 2 is a protein that in humans is encoded by the BAG2 gene.

BAG proteins compete with Hip for binding to the Hsc70/Hsp70 ATPase domain and promote substrate release. All the BAG proteins have an approximately 45-amino acid BAG domain near the C terminus but differ markedly in their N-terminal regions. The predicted BAG2 protein contains 211 amino acids. The BAG domains of BAG1, BAG2, and BAG3 interact specifically with the Hsc70 ATPase domain in vitro and in mammalian cells. All 3 proteins bind with high affinity to the ATPase domain of Hsc70 and inhibit its chaperone activity in a Hip-repressible manner.

== Interactions ==
BAG2 has been shown to interact with HSPA8.
