= STUB1 =

Protein-coding gene in the species Homo sapiens

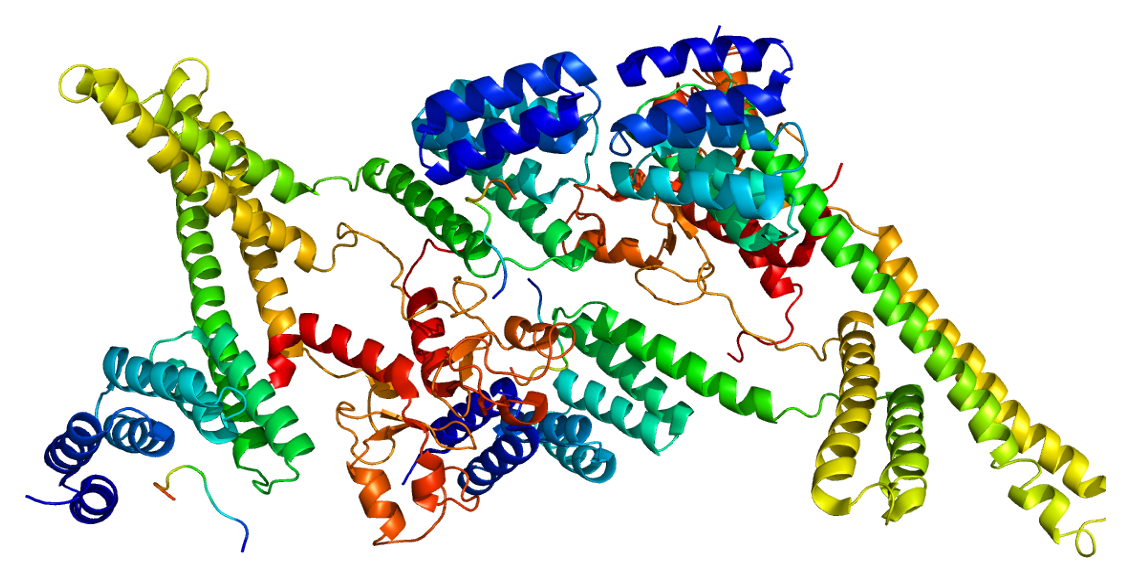

Identifiers
- Aliases: STUB1, CHIP, HSPABP2, NY-CO-7, SCAR16, SDCCAG7, UBOX1, STIP1 homology and U-box containing protein 1, SCA48
- External IDs: OMIM: 607207; MGI: 1891731; GeneCards: STUB1
Available structures
PDB	Ortholog search: PDBe RCSB
PDB	List of PDB id codes 4KBQ
Enzyme activity
EC #	BRENDA	ExPASy	KEGG	MetaCyc
2.3.2.27	↗	↗	↗	↗

Gene location (Human)
Chr.	Chromosome 16 (human)
Band	16p13.3	Start	680,224 bp
Band	16p13.3	End	682,870 bp

Gene location (Mouse)
Chr.	Chromosome 17 (mouse)
Band	17 A3.3|17 12.93 cM	Start	26,049,479 bp
Band	17 A3.3|17 12.93 cM	End	26,052,378 bp
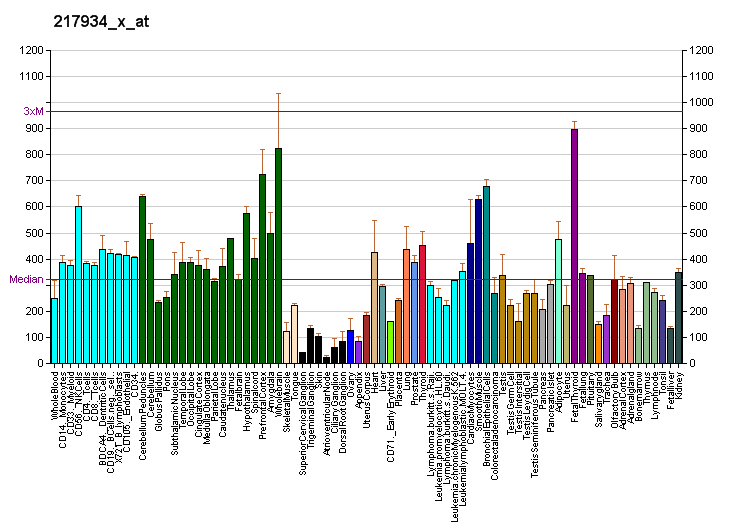
RNA expression pattern
Bgee	Human / Mouse (ortholog); Top expressed in: lateral nuclear group of thalamus; postcentral gyrus; pars compacta; external globus pallidus; pars reticulata; spinal ganglia; superior vestibular nucleus; ventral tegmental area; parotid gland; pons / Top expressed in: neural tube; lens; bone marrow; islet of Langerhans; mesencephalon; adrenal gland; rhombencephalon; striatum of neuraxis; hypothalamus; urinary bladder; More reference expression data
BioGPS	More reference expression data
Gene ontology
Molecular function	Hsp90 protein binding; protein-macromolecule adaptor activity; protein homodimerization activity; misfolded protein binding; ubiquitin protein ligase activity; ubiquitin-protein transferase activity; ubiquitin-ubiquitin ligase activity; kinase binding; protein binding; enzyme binding; TPR domain binding; G protein-coupled receptor binding; ubiquitin protein ligase binding; transferase activity; Hsp70 protein binding; SMAD binding; heat shock protein binding; tau protein binding; chaperone binding
Cellular component	cytoplasm; ubiquitin ligase complex; nucleoplasm; Z discdkac; endoplasmic reticulum; nuclear inclusion body; extracellular exosome; ubiquitin conjugating enzyme complex; nucleus; cytosol; chaperone complex
Biological process	positive regulation of chaperone-mediated protein complex assembly; regulation of protein stability; ubiquitin-dependent protein catabolic process; regulation of glucocorticoid metabolic process; protein K63-linked ubiquitination; protein maturation; protein polyubiquitination; protein quality control for misfolded or incompletely synthesized proteins; negative regulation of protein binding; ubiquitin-dependent SMAD protein catabolic process; cellular response to DNA damage stimulus; endoplasmic reticulum unfolded protein response; positive regulation of ubiquitin-protein transferase activity; protein ubiquitination; positive regulation of protein ubiquitination; positive regulation of proteasomal ubiquitin-dependent protein catabolic process; DNA repair; proteasome-mediated ubiquitin-dependent protein catabolic process; protein autoubiquitination; cellular response to misfolded protein; ERBB2 signaling pathway; negative regulation of transforming growth factor beta receptor signaling pathway; ubiquitin-dependent ERAD pathway; response to ischemia; cellular response to heat; chaperone-mediated autophagy; cellular response to hypoxia
Sources:Amigo / QuickGO
Orthologs
Databases	NCBI: entry; OMA: entry
Species	Human	Mouse
Entrez	10273	56424
Ensembl	ENSG00000103266	ENSMUSG00000039615
UniProt	Q9UNE7	Q9WUD1
RefSeq (mRNA)	NM_005861; NM_001293197	NM_019719
RefSeq (protein)	NP_001280126; NP_005852	NP_062693
Location (UCSC)	Chr 16: 0.68 – 0.68 Mb	Chr 17: 26.05 – 26.05 Mb
PubMed search
- Wikidata
View/Edit Human	View/Edit Mouse

STUB1 (STIP1 homology and U-Box containing protein 1) is a human gene that codes for the protein CHIP (C terminus of HSC70-Interacting Protein).

== Function ==
The CHIP protein encoded by this gene binds to and inhibits the ATPase activity of the chaperone proteins HSC70 and HSP70 and blocks the forward reaction of the HSC70-HSP70 substrate-binding cycle. In addition, CHIP possesses E3 ubiquitin ligase activity and promotes ubiquitylation, mainly of chaperone-bound misfolded proteins.

CHIP enhances HSP70 induction during acute stress and also mediates its turnover during the stress recovery process. Hence CHIP appears to maintain protein homeostasis by controlling chaperone levels during stress and recovery.

Mutations in STUB1 cause spinocerebellar ataxia type 16.

STUB1 regulates cytokine receptors in T cells and myeloid cells.

== Interactions ==
STUB1 has been shown to interact with:

- C-Raf,
- DNAJB1,
- HSPA1A,
- HSPA4,
- HSPA8,
- Parkin (ligase), and
- RUNX2.
