= BAG1 =

Protein-coding gene in the species Homo sapiens

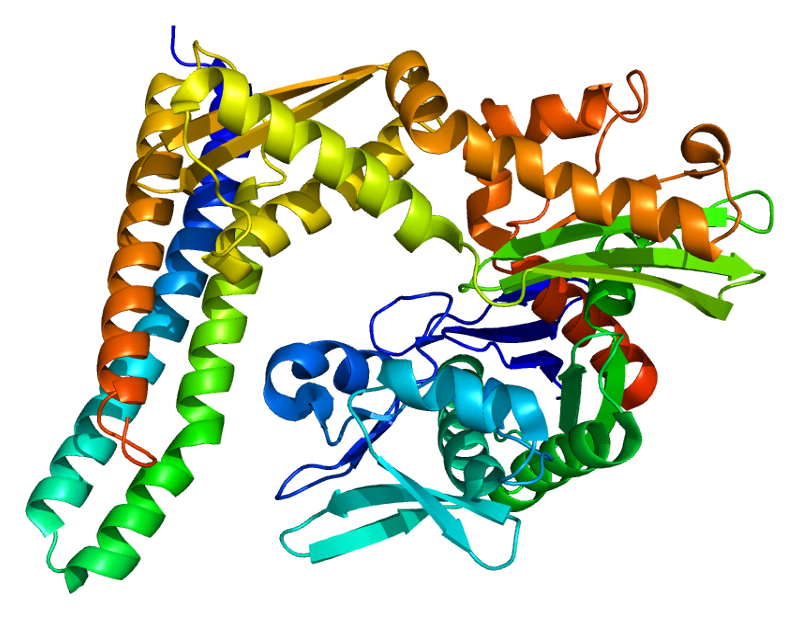

Identifiers
- Aliases: BAG1, BAG-1, HAP, RAP46, BCL2 associated athanogene 1, BAG cochaperone 1
- External IDs: OMIM: 601497; MGI: 108047; GeneCards: BAG1
Available structures
PDB	Ortholog search: PDBe RCSB
PDB	List of PDB id codes 1HX1, 1WXV, 3FZF, 3FZH, 3FZK, 3FZL, 3FZM, 3LDQ, 3M3Z

Gene location (Human)
Chr.	Chromosome 9 (human)
Band	9p13.3	Start	33,247,820 bp
Band	9p13.3	End	33,264,720 bp

Gene location (Mouse)
Chr.	Chromosome 4 (mouse)
Band	4|4 A5	Start	40,936,398 bp
Band	4|4 A5	End	40,948,294 bp
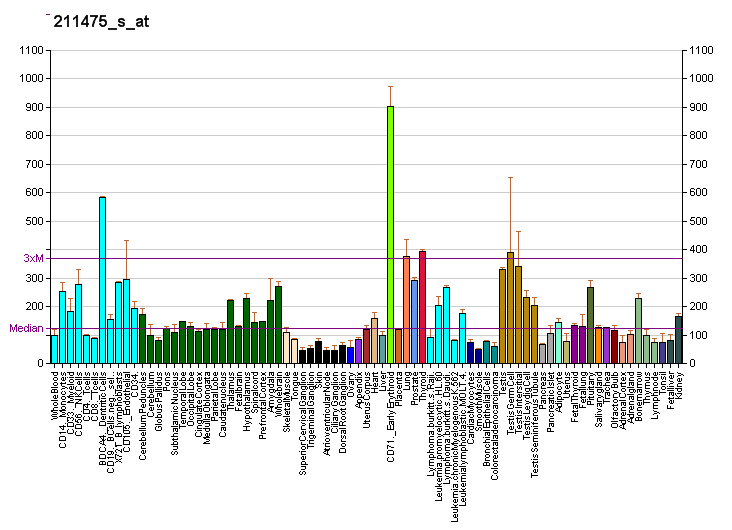

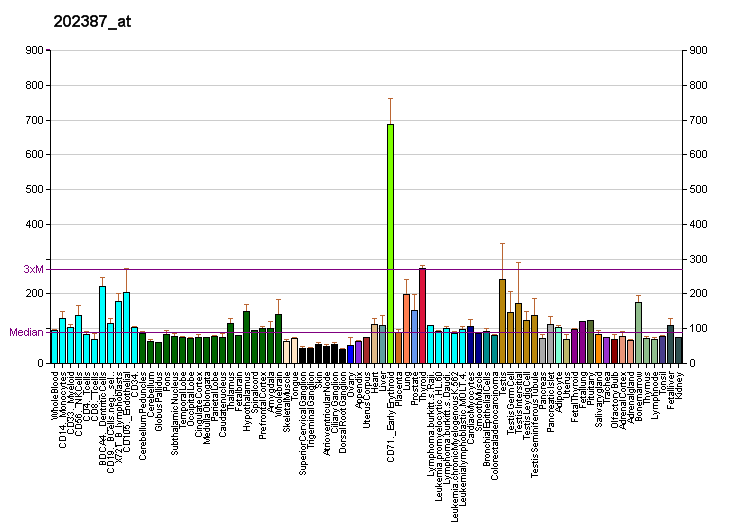
RNA expression pattern
Bgee	Human / Mouse (ortholog); Top expressed in: palpebral conjunctiva; sperm; apex of heart; olfactory zone of nasal mucosa; right auricle of heart; right testis; left testis; skin of abdomen; gastrocnemius muscle; skin of leg / Top expressed in: seminiferous tubule; epithelium of stomach; lacrimal gland; crypt of lieberkuhn of small intestine; blood; mucous cell of stomach; decidua; right kidney; muscle of thigh; parotid gland; More reference expression data
BioGPS	More reference expression data
Gene ontology
Molecular function	chaperone binding; protein binding; adenyl-nucleotide exchange factor activity; ubiquitin protein ligase binding
Cellular component	cytoplasm; cytosol; nucleus
Biological process	regulation of cellular response to heat; cell surface receptor signaling pathway; negative regulation of apoptotic process; apoptotic process; regulation of catalytic activity; chaperone cofactor-dependent protein refolding
Sources:Amigo / QuickGO
Orthologs
Databases	NCBI: entry; OMA: entry
Species	Human	Mouse
Entrez	573	12017
Ensembl	ENSG00000107262	ENSMUSG00000028416
UniProt	Q99933	Q60739
RefSeq (mRNA)	NM_004323; NM_001172415; NM_001349286; NM_001349299	NM_001171739; NM_009736
RefSeq (protein)	NP_001165886; NP_004314; NP_001336215; NP_001336228	NP_001165210; NP_033866
Location (UCSC)	Chr 9: 33.25 – 33.26 Mb	Chr 4: 40.94 – 40.95 Mb
PubMed search
- Wikidata
View/Edit Human	View/Edit Mouse

BAG family molecular chaperone regulator 1 is a protein that in humans is encoded by the BAG1 gene.

== Function ==
The oncogene BCL2 is a membrane protein that blocks a step in a pathway leading to apoptosis or programmed cell death. The protein encoded by this gene binds to BCL2 and is referred to as BCL2-associated athanogene. It enhances the anti-apoptotic effects of BCL2 and represents a link between growth factor receptors and anti-apoptotic mechanisms. At least three protein isoforms are encoded by this mRNA through the use of alternative translation initiation sites, including a non-AUG site.

== Clinical significance ==
BAG gene has been implicated in age related neurodegenerative diseases as Alzheimer's. It has been demonstrated that BAG1 and BAG 3 regulate the proteasomal and lysosomal protein elimination pathways, respectively.

== Interactions ==
BAG1 has been shown to interact with:

- Androgen receptor,
- C-Raf,
- Calcitriol receptor,
- Glucocorticoid receptor,
- HSPA8,
- HBEGF,
- PPP1R15A,
- NR1B1, and
- SIAH1.
