= LAMP2 =

Protein-coding gene in the species Homo sapiens

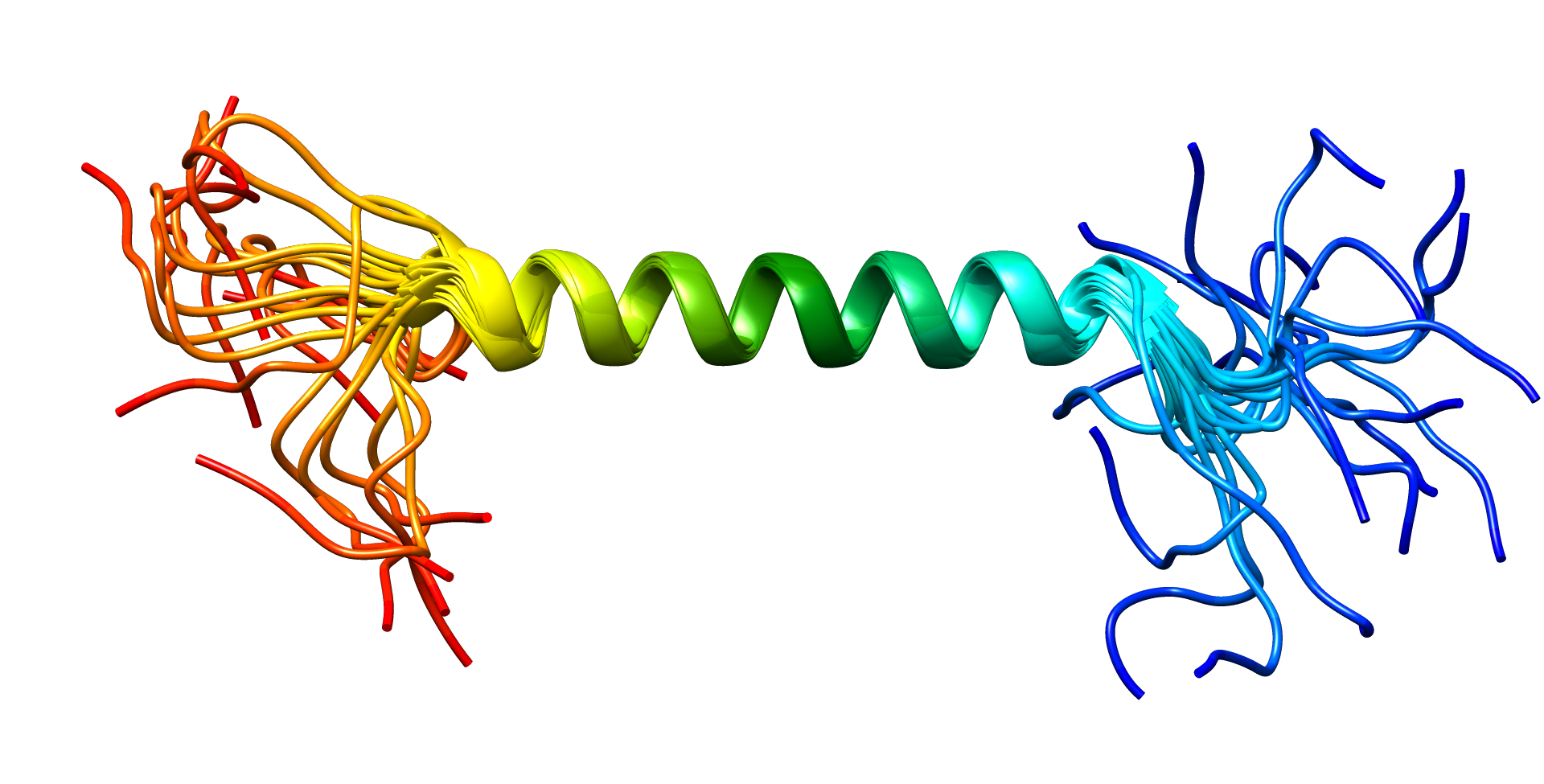

Identifiers
- Aliases: LAMP2, CD107b, LAMP-2, LAMPB, LGP110, lysosomal associated membrane protein 2, LGP-96, DND
- External IDs: OMIM: 309060; MGI: 96748; GeneCards: LAMP2
Available structures
PDB	Ortholog search: PDBe RCSB
PDB	List of PDB id codes 2MOF, 2MOM

Gene location (Human)
Chr.	X chromosome (human)
Band	Xq24	Start	120,426,148 bp
Band	Xq24	End	120,469,365 bp

Gene location (Mouse)
Chr.	X chromosome (mouse)
Band	X A3.3|X 22.67 cM	Start	37,490,234 bp
Band	X A3.3|X 22.67 cM	End	37,545,331 bp
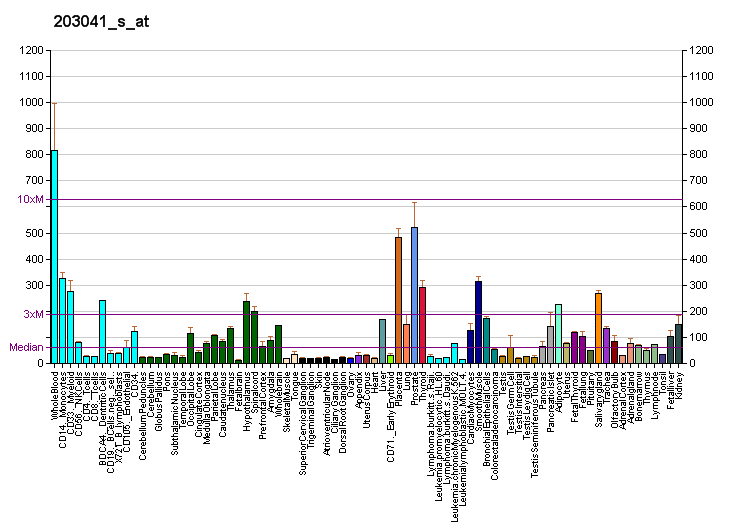

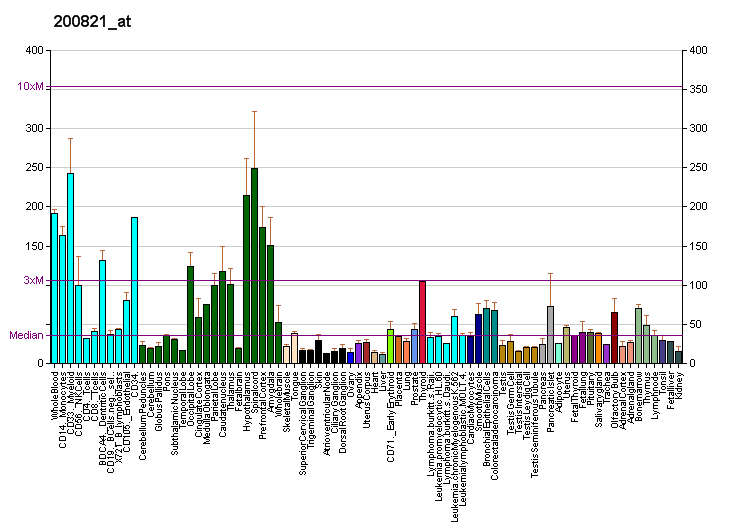

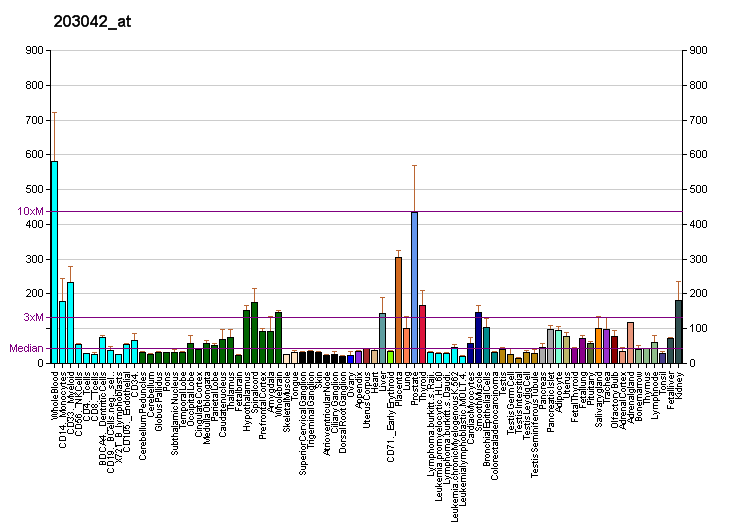
RNA expression pattern
Bgee	Human / Mouse (ortholog); Top expressed in: corpus callosum; external globus pallidus; kidney tubule; parotid gland; gallbladder; inferior ganglion of vagus nerve; stromal cell of endometrium; C1 segment; gingival epithelium; pars reticulata / Top expressed in: ciliary body; iris; Epithelium of choroid plexus; conjunctival fornix; vestibular sensory epithelium; aortic valve; right kidney; hair follicle; stroma of bone marrow; molar; More reference expression data
BioGPS	More reference expression data
Gene ontology
Molecular function	protein domain specific binding; protein binding; enzyme binding
Cellular component	integral component of membrane; membrane microdomain; endosome; late endosome; phagocytic vesicle membrane; chaperone-mediated autophagy translocation complex; membrane; late endosome membrane; plasma membrane; lysosomal membrane; lysosomal lumen; platelet dense granule membrane; lysosome; endosome membrane; extracellular exosome; autophagosome membrane; extracellular space; trans-Golgi network; cytoplasmic vesicle; azurophil granule membrane; autolysosome; perinuclear region of cytoplasm; integral component of autophagosome membrane; ficolin-1-rich granule membrane; membrane raft; lysosomal matrix
Biological process	regulation of protein stability; muscle cell cellular homeostasis; protein stabilization; platelet degranulation; protein import; protein targeting; autophagy; cellular response to starvation; negative regulation of protein homooligomerization; neutrophil degranulation; chaperone-mediated autophagy; protein targeting to lysosome involved in chaperone-mediated autophagy; autophagosome maturation; lysosomal protein catabolic process; establishment of protein localization to organelle
Sources:Amigo / QuickGO
Orthologs
Databases	NCBI: entry; OMA: entry
Species	Human	Mouse
Entrez	3920	16784
Ensembl	ENSG00000005893	ENSMUSG00000016534
UniProt	P13473	P17047
RefSeq (mRNA)	NM_013995; NM_001122606; NM_002294	NM_001017959; NM_001290485; NM_010685
RefSeq (protein)	NP_001116078; NP_002285; NP_054701	NP_001017959; NP_001277414; NP_034815
Location (UCSC)	Chr X: 120.43 – 120.47 Mb	Chr X: 37.49 – 37.55 Mb
PubMed search
- Wikidata
View/Edit Human	View/Edit Mouse

Lysosome-associated membrane protein 2 (LAMP2), also known as CD107b (Cluster of Differentiation 107b) and Mac-3, is a human gene. Its protein, LAMP2, is one of the lysosome-associated membrane glycoproteins.

The protein encoded by this gene is a member of a family of membrane glycoproteins. This glycoprotein provides selectins with carbohydrate ligands. It may play a role in tumor cell metastasis. It may also function in the protection, maintenance, and adhesion of the lysosome. Alternative splicing of the gene produces three variants - LAMP-2A, LAMP-2B and LAMP-2C. LAMP-2A is the receptor for chaperone-mediated autophagy. Recently it has been determined that antibodies against LAMP-2 account for a fraction of patients who get a serious kidney disease termed focal necrotizing glomerulonephritis.

LAMP-2B is associated with Danon disease.

== Structure and tissue distribution ==
The gene for LAMP2 has 9 coding exons and 2 alternate last exons, 9a and 9b. When the last exon is spliced with the alternative exon, it is a variant called LAMP2b, which varies in the last 11 amino acids of its C-terminal sequence: in the luminal domain, the transmembrane domain, and the cytoplasmic tail. The original (LAMP2a) is highly expressed in the placenta, lung, and liver, while LAMP2b is highly expressed in skeletal muscle.

== Function ==
Lysosomes are cell organelles found in most animal cells. Their main functions center around breaking down materials and debris in the cell. Some of this is done via acid hydrolases that degrade foreign materials and have specialized autolytic functions. These hydrolyses are stored in the lysosomal membrane, which also house lysosomal membrane glycoproteins.

LAMP1 and LAMP2 make up about 50% of lysosomal membrane glycoproteins. (See LAMP1 for more information on both LAMP1 and LAMP2.) Both of these consist of polypeptides of about 40 kD, with the core polypeptide surrounded by 16 to 20 attached N-linked saccharides. The biological functions of these glycoproteins are disputed. They are believed to be significantly involved in operations of the lysosomes, including maintaining integrity, pH and catabolism. Further, some of the functions of LAMP2 are believed to be protecting the lysosomal membrane from proteolytic enzymes that are within the lysosome itself (as in autodigestion), acting as a receptor into the lysosome for proteins, adhesion (when expressed on the outside surface of the plasma membrane) and signal transduction, both inter- and intra-. It also provides protection for the cell from methylating mutagens.

== Role in cancer ==
LAMP2 has been specifically implicated in tumor cell metastasis. Both LAMP1 and LAMP2 have been found expressed on the surface of cancerous tumors, specifically in cells of highly metastatic cancer such as colon cancer and melanoma. They are rarely found on the plasma membranes of normal cells, and are found more on highly metastatic tumors than on poorly metastatic ones. LAMP2, along with LAMP1, interact with E-selectin and galectins to mediate the adhesion of some cancer cells to the ECM. The two LAMP molecules act as ligands for the cell-adhesion molecules.

It has also been shown that the down-regulation of LAMP2 could both reduce the resistance of breast cancer cells to the paclitaxel and could inhibit cell proliferation in multiple myeloma cells.

Along with other genes such as LC3B, p62 and CTSB, a strong up regulation of LAMP2 was detected in perinecrotic areas of glioblastomas. This suggests autophagy induction in gliomas could be caused by micro-environmental changes.

In a study of glial tumors, the cell membranes of glial and endothelial cells were found to contain LAMP1 and LAMP2, while YKL-40 (a different glycoprotein) was found in the cytoplasm. This suggests that the three glycoproteins are involved in tumor development, specifically in the processes of angiogenesis and tissue remodeling.

== Inducers ==
- CA77.1
- QX39

== See also ==
- Cluster of differentiation
