= List of human protein-coding genes 2 =

Human protein-coding genes listed in the HGNC database
index	Gene symbol	HGNC and UniProt ID(s)
2251	CCDC18	HGNC:30370; Q5T9S5
2252	CCDC22	HGNC:28909; O60826
2253	CCDC24	HGNC:28688; Q8N4L8
2254	CCDC25	HGNC:25591; Q86WR0
2255	CCDC27	HGNC:26546; Q2M243
2256	CCDC28A	HGNC:21098; Q8IWP9
2257	CCDC28B	HGNC:28163; Q9BUN5
2258	CCDC30	HGNC:26103; Q5VVM6
2259	CCDC32	HGNC:28295; Q9BV29
2260	CCDC33	HGNC:26552; Q8N5R6
2261	CCDC34	HGNC:25079; Q96HJ3
2262	CCDC38	HGNC:26843; Q502W7
2263	CCDC39	HGNC:25244; Q9UFE4
2264	CCDC40	HGNC:26090; Q4G0X9
2265	CCDC42	HGNC:26528; Q96M95
2266	CCDC43	HGNC:26472; Q96MW1
2267	CCDC47	HGNC:24856; Q96A33
2268	CCDC50	HGNC:18111; Q8IVM0
2269	CCDC51	HGNC:25714; Q96ER9
2270	CCDC54	HGNC:30703; Q8NEL0
2271	CCDC57	HGNC:27564; Q2TAC2
2272	CCDC59	HGNC:25005; Q9P031
2273	CCDC60	HGNC:28610; Q8IWA6
2274	CCDC61	HGNC:33629; Q9Y6R9
2275	CCDC62	HGNC:30723; Q6P9F0
2276	CCDC63	HGNC:26669; Q8NA47
2277	CCDC66	HGNC:27709; A2RUB6
2278	CCDC68	HGNC:24350; Q9H2F9
2279	CCDC69	HGNC:24487; A6NI79
2280	CCDC70	HGNC:25303; Q6NSX1
2281	CCDC71	HGNC:25760; Q8IV32
2282	CCDC71L	HGNC:26685; Q8N9Z2
2283	CCDC73	HGNC:23261; Q6ZRK6
2284	CCDC74A	HGNC:25197; Q96AQ1
2285	CCDC74B	HGNC:25267; Q96LY2
2286	CCDC77	HGNC:28203; Q9BR77
2287	CCDC78	HGNC:14153; A2IDD5
2288	CCDC80	HGNC:30649; Q76M96
2289	CCDC81	HGNC:26281; Q6ZN84
2290	CCDC82	HGNC:26282; Q8N4S0
2291	CCDC83	HGNC:28535; Q8IWF9
2292	CCDC85A	HGNC:29400; Q96PX6
2293	CCDC85B	HGNC:24926; Q15834
2294	CCDC85C	HGNC:35459; A6NKD9
2295	CCDC86	HGNC:28359; Q9H6F5
2296	CCDC87	HGNC:25579; Q9NVE4
2297	CCDC88A	HGNC:25523; Q3V6T2
2298	CCDC88B	HGNC:26757; A6NC98
2299	CCDC88C	HGNC:19967; Q9P219
2300	CCDC89	HGNC:26762; Q8N998
2301	CCDC90B	HGNC:28108; Q9GZT6
2302	CCDC91	HGNC:24855; Q7Z6B0
2303	CCDC92	HGNC:29563; Q53HC0
2304	CCDC92B	HGNC:52279; A0A8I5KY20
2305	CCDC93	HGNC:25611; Q567U6
2306	CCDC97	HGNC:28289; Q96F63
2307	CCDC102A	HGNC:28097; Q96A19
2308	CCDC102B	HGNC:26295; Q68D86
2309	CCDC106	HGNC:30181; Q9BWC9
2310	CCDC107	HGNC:28465; Q8WV48
2311	CCDC110	HGNC:28504; Q8TBZ0
2312	CCDC112	HGNC:28599; Q8NEF3
2313	CCDC116	HGNC:26688; Q8IYX3
2314	CCDC117	HGNC:26599; Q8IWD4
2315	CCDC120	HGNC:28910; Q96HB5
2316	CCDC121	HGNC:25833; Q6ZUS5
2317	CCDC122	HGNC:26478; Q5T0U0
2318	CCDC124	HGNC:25171; Q96CT7
2319	CCDC125	HGNC:28924; Q86Z20
2320	CCDC126	HGNC:22398; Q96EE4
2321	CCDC127	HGNC:30520; Q96BQ5
2322	CCDC134	HGNC:26185; Q9H6E4
2323	CCDC136	HGNC:22225; Q96JN2
2324	CCDC137	HGNC:33451; Q6PK04
2325	CCDC138	HGNC:26531; Q96M89
2326	CCDC141	HGNC:26821; Q6ZP82
2327	CCDC142	HGNC:25889; Q17RM4
2328	CCDC144A	HGNC:29072; A2RUR9
2329	CCDC146	HGNC:29296; Q8IYE0
2330	CCDC148	HGNC:25191; Q8NFR7
2331	CCDC149	HGNC:25405; Q6ZUS6
2332	CCDC150	HGNC:26834; Q8NCX0
2333	CCDC152	HGNC:34438; Q4G0S7
2334	CCDC154	HGNC:34454; A6NI56
2335	CCDC157	HGNC:33854; Q569K6
2336	CCDC158	HGNC:26374; Q5M9N0
2337	CCDC159	HGNC:26996; P0C7I6
2338	CCDC160	HGNC:37286; A6NGH7
2339	CCDC163	HGNC:27003; A0A0D9SF12
2340	CCDC166	HGNC:41910; P0CW27
2341	CCDC167	HGNC:21239; Q9P0B6
2342	CCDC169	HGNC:34361; A6NNP5
2343	CCDC170	HGNC:21177; Q8IYT3
2344	CCDC171	HGNC:29828; Q6TFL3
2345	CCDC172	HGNC:30524; P0C7W6
2346	CCDC174	HGNC:28033; Q6PII3
2347	CCDC175	HGNC:19847; P0C221
2348	CCDC177	HGNC:23243; Q9NQR7
2349	CCDC178	HGNC:29588; Q5BJE1
2350	CCDC179	HGNC:44653; H3BU77
2351	CCDC180	HGNC:29303; Q9P1Z9
2352	CCDC181	HGNC:28051; Q5TID7
2353	CCDC182	HGNC:49392; A6NF36
2354	CCDC183	HGNC:28236; Q5T5S1
2355	CCDC184	HGNC:33749; Q52MB2
2356	CCDC185	HGNC:26654; Q8N715
2357	CCDC186	HGNC:24349; Q7Z3E2
2358	CCDC187	HGNC:30942; A0A096LP49
2359	CCDC188	HGNC:51899; H7C350
2360	CCDC190	HGNC:28736; Q86UF4
2361	CCDC191	HGNC:29272; Q8NCU4
2362	CCDC192	HGNC:49566; P0DO97
2363	CCDC194	HGNC:53438; A0A1B0GVG4
2364	CCDC195	HGNC:53441; A0A1B0GUA6
2365	CCDC196	HGNC:20100; A0A1B0GTZ2
2366	CCDC197	HGNC:19860; Q8NCU1
2367	CCDC198	HGNC:20189; Q9NVL8
2368	CCDC200	HGNC:43658; A0A1B0GVQ3
2369	CCDC201	HGNC:54081; A0A1B0GTI1
2370	CCER1	HGNC:28373; Q8TC90
2371	CCER2	HGNC:44662; I3L3R5
2372	CCHCR1	HGNC:13930; Q8TD31
2373	CCIN	HGNC:1568; Q13939
2374	CCK	HGNC:1569; P06307
2375	CCKAR	HGNC:1570; P32238
2376	CCKBR	HGNC:1571; P32239
2377	CCL1	HGNC:10609; P22362
2378	CCL2	HGNC:10618; P13500
2379	CCL3	HGNC:10627; P10147
2380	CCL3L3	HGNC:30554; P16619
2381	CCL4	HGNC:10630; P13236
2382	CCL4L2	HGNC:24066; Q8NHW4
2383	CCL5	HGNC:10632; P13501
2384	CCL7	HGNC:10634; P80098
2385	CCL8	HGNC:10635; P80075
2386	CCL11	HGNC:10610; P51671
2387	CCL13	HGNC:10611; Q99616
2388	CCL14	HGNC:10612; Q16627
2389	CCL15	HGNC:10613; Q16663
2390	CCL16	HGNC:10614; O15467
2391	CCL17	HGNC:10615; Q92583
2392	CCL18	HGNC:10616; P55774
2393	CCL19	HGNC:10617; Q99731
2394	CCL20	HGNC:10619; P78556
2395	CCL21	HGNC:10620; O00585
2396	CCL22	HGNC:10621; O00626
2397	CCL23	HGNC:10622; P55773
2398	CCL24	HGNC:10623; O00175
2399	CCL25	HGNC:10624; O15444
2400	CCL26	HGNC:10625; Q9Y258
2401	CCL27	HGNC:10626; Q9Y4X3
2402	CCL28	HGNC:17700; Q9NRJ3
2403	CCM2	HGNC:21708; Q9BSQ5
2404	CCM2L	HGNC:16153; Q9NUG4
2405	CCN1	HGNC:2654; O00622
2406	CCN2	HGNC:2500; P29279
2407	CCN3	HGNC:7885; P48745
2408	CCN4	HGNC:12769; O95388
2409	CCN5	HGNC:12770; O76076
2410	CCN6	HGNC:12771; O95389
2411	CCNA1	HGNC:1577; P78396
2412	CCNA2	HGNC:1578; P20248
2413	CCNB1	HGNC:1579; P14635
2414	CCNB1IP1	HGNC:19437; Q9NPC3
2415	CCNB2	HGNC:1580; O95067
2416	CCNB3	HGNC:18709; Q8WWL7
2417	CCNC	HGNC:1581; P24863
2418	CCND1	HGNC:1582; P24385
2419	CCND2	HGNC:1583; P30279
2420	CCND3	HGNC:1585; P30281
2421	CCNDBP1	HGNC:1587; O95273
2422	CCNE1	HGNC:1589; P24864
2423	CCNE2	HGNC:1590; O96020
2424	CCNF	HGNC:1591; P41002
2425	CCNG1	HGNC:1592; P51959
2426	CCNG2	HGNC:1593; Q16589
2427	CCNH	HGNC:1594; P51946
2428	CCNI	HGNC:1595; Q14094
2429	CCNI2	HGNC:33869; Q6ZMN8
2430	CCNJ	HGNC:23434; Q5T5M9
2431	CCNJL	HGNC:25876; Q8IV13
2432	CCNK	HGNC:1596; O75909
2433	CCNL1	HGNC:20569; Q9UK58
2434	CCNL2	HGNC:20570; Q96S94
2435	CCNO	HGNC:18576; P22674
2436	CCNP	HGNC:25805; Q9H8S5
2437	CCNQ	HGNC:28434; Q8N1B3
2438	CCNT1	HGNC:1599; O60563
2439	CCNT2	HGNC:1600; O60583
2440	CCNY	HGNC:23354; Q8ND76
2441	CCNYL1	HGNC:26868; Q8N7R7
2442	CCNYL1B	HGNC:56313; A0A8V8TMC4
2443	CCP110	HGNC:24342; O43303
2444	CCPG1	HGNC:24227; Q9ULG6
2445	CCR1	HGNC:1602; P32246
2446	CCR2	HGNC:1603; P41597
2447	CCR3	HGNC:1604; P51677
2448	CCR4	HGNC:1605; P51679
2449	CCR5	HGNC:1606; P51681
2450	CCR6	HGNC:1607; P51684
2451	CCR7	HGNC:1608; P32248
2452	CCR8	HGNC:1609; P51685
2453	CCR9	HGNC:1610; P51686
2454	CCR10	HGNC:4474; P46092
2455	CCRL2	HGNC:1612; O00421
2456	CCS	HGNC:1613; O14618
2457	CCSAP	HGNC:29578; Q6IQ19
2458	CCSER1	HGNC:29349; Q9C0I3
2459	CCSER2	HGNC:29197; Q9H7U1
2460	CCT2	HGNC:1615; P78371
2461	CCT3	HGNC:1616; P49368
2462	CCT4	HGNC:1617; P50991
2463	CCT5	HGNC:1618; P48643
2464	CCT6A	HGNC:1620; P40227
2465	CCT6B	HGNC:1621; Q92526
2466	CCT7	HGNC:1622; Q99832
2467	CCT8	HGNC:1623; P50990
2468	CCT8L2	HGNC:15553; Q96SF2
2469	CCZ1	HGNC:21691; P86791
2470	CCZ1B	HGNC:21717; P86790
2471	CD1A	HGNC:1634; P06126
2472	CD1B	HGNC:1635; P29016
2473	CD1C	HGNC:1636; P29017
2474	CD1D	HGNC:1637; P15813
2475	CD1E	HGNC:1638; P15812
2476	CD2	HGNC:1639; P06729
2477	CD2AP	HGNC:14258; Q9Y5K6
2478	CD2BP2	HGNC:1656; O95400
2479	CD3D	HGNC:1673; P04234
2480	CD3E	HGNC:1674; P07766
2481	CD3G	HGNC:1675; P09693
2482	CD4	HGNC:1678; P01730
2483	CD5	HGNC:1685; P06127
2484	CD5L	HGNC:1690; O43866
2485	CD6	HGNC:1691; P30203
2486	CD7	HGNC:1695; P09564
2487	CD8A	HGNC:1706; P01732
2488	CD8B	HGNC:1707; P10966
2489	CD8B2	HGNC:1708; A6NJW9
2490	CD9	HGNC:1709; P21926
2491	CD14	HGNC:1628; P08571
2492	CD19	HGNC:1633; P15391
2493	CD22	HGNC:1643; P20273
2494	CD24	HGNC:1645; P25063
2495	CD27	HGNC:11922; P26842
2496	CD28	HGNC:1653; P10747
2497	CD33	HGNC:1659; P20138
2498	CD34	HGNC:1662; P28906
2499	CD36	HGNC:1663; P16671
2500	CD37	HGNC:1666; P11049
2501	CD38	HGNC:1667; P28907
2502	CD40	HGNC:11919; P25942
2503	CD40LG	HGNC:11935; P29965
2504	CD44	HGNC:1681; P16070
2505	CD46	HGNC:6953; P15529
2506	CD47	HGNC:1682; Q08722
2507	CD48	HGNC:1683; P09326
2508	CD52	HGNC:1804; P31358
2509	CD53	HGNC:1686; P19397
2510	CD55	HGNC:2665; P08174
2511	CD58	HGNC:1688; P19256
2512	CD59	HGNC:1689; P13987
2513	CD63	HGNC:1692; P08962
2514	CD68	HGNC:1693; P34810
2515	CD69	HGNC:1694; Q07108
2516	CD70	HGNC:11937; P32970
2517	CD72	HGNC:1696; P21854
2518	CD74	HGNC:1697; P04233
2519	CD79A	HGNC:1698; P11912
2520	CD79B	HGNC:1699; P40259
2521	CD80	HGNC:1700; P33681
2522	CD81	HGNC:1701; P60033
2523	CD82	HGNC:6210; P27701
2524	CD83	HGNC:1703; Q01151
2525	CD84	HGNC:1704; Q9UIB8
2526	CD86	HGNC:1705; P42081
2527	CD93	HGNC:15855; Q9NPY3
2528	CD96	HGNC:16892; P40200
2529	CD99	HGNC:7082; P14209
2530	CD99L2	HGNC:18237; Q8TCZ2
2531	CD101	HGNC:5949; Q93033
2532	CD109	HGNC:21685; Q6YHK3
2533	CD151	HGNC:1630; P48509
2534	CD160	HGNC:17013; O95971
2535	CD163	HGNC:1631; Q86VB7
2536	CD163L1	HGNC:30375; Q9NR16
2537	CD164	HGNC:1632; Q04900
2538	CD164L2	HGNC:32043; Q6UWJ8
2539	CD177	HGNC:30072; Q8N6Q3
2540	CD180	HGNC:6726; Q99467
2541	CD200	HGNC:7203; P41217
2542	CD200R1	HGNC:24235; Q8TD46
2543	CD200R1L	HGNC:24665; Q6Q8B3
2544	CD207	HGNC:17935; Q9UJ71
2545	CD209	HGNC:1641; Q9NNX6
2546	CD226	HGNC:16961; Q15762
2547	CD244	HGNC:18171; Q9BZW8
2548	CD247	HGNC:1677; P20963
2549	CD248	HGNC:18219; Q9HCU0
2550	CD274	HGNC:17635; Q9NZQ7
2551	CD276	HGNC:19137; Q5ZPR3
2552	CD300A	HGNC:19319; Q9UGN4
2553	CD300C	HGNC:19320; Q08708
2554	CD300E	HGNC:28874; Q496F6
2555	CD300H	HGNC:52292; A0A0K2S4Q6
2556	CD300LB	HGNC:30811; A8K4G0
2557	CD300LD	HGNC:16848; Q6UXZ3
2558	CD300LF	HGNC:29883; Q8TDQ1
2559	CD300LG	HGNC:30455; Q6UXG3
2560	CD302	HGNC:30843; Q8IX05
2561	CD320	HGNC:16692; Q9NPF0
2562	CDA	HGNC:1712; P32320
2563	CDADC1	HGNC:20299; Q9BWV3
2564	CDAN1	HGNC:1713; Q8IWY9
2565	CDC5L	HGNC:1743; Q99459
2566	CDC6	HGNC:1744; Q99741
2567	CDC7	HGNC:1745; O00311
2568	CDC14A	HGNC:1718; Q9UNH5
2569	CDC14B	HGNC:1719; O60729
2570	CDC14C	HGNC:22427; A4D256
2571	CDC16	HGNC:1720; Q13042
2572	CDC20	HGNC:1723; Q12834
2573	CDC20B	HGNC:24222; Q86Y33
2574	CDC23	HGNC:1724; Q9UJX2
2575	CDC25A	HGNC:1725; P30304
2576	CDC25B	HGNC:1726; P30305
2577	CDC25C	HGNC:1727; P30307
2578	CDC26	HGNC:17839; Q8NHZ8
2579	CDC27	HGNC:1728; P30260
2580	CDC34	HGNC:1734; P49427
2581	CDC37	HGNC:1735; Q16543
2582	CDC37L1	HGNC:17179; Q7L3B6
2583	CDC40	HGNC:17350; O60508
2584	CDC42	HGNC:1736; P60953
2585	CDC42BPA	HGNC:1737; Q5VT25
2586	CDC42BPB	HGNC:1738; Q9Y5S2
2587	CDC42BPG	HGNC:29829; Q6DT37
2588	CDC42EP1	HGNC:17014; Q00587
2589	CDC42EP2	HGNC:16263; O14613
2590	CDC42EP3	HGNC:16943; Q9UKI2
2591	CDC42EP4	HGNC:17147; Q9H3Q1
2592	CDC42EP5	HGNC:17408; Q6NZY7
2593	CDC42SE1	HGNC:17719; Q9NRR8
2594	CDC42SE2	HGNC:18547; Q9NRR3
2595	CDC45	HGNC:1739; O75419
2596	CDC73	HGNC:16783; Q6P1J9
2597	CDC123	HGNC:16827; O75794
2598	CDCA2	HGNC:14623; Q69YH5
2599	CDCA3	HGNC:14624; Q99618
2600	CDCA4	HGNC:14625; Q9BXL8
2601	CDCA5	HGNC:14626; Q96FF9
2602	CDCA7	HGNC:14628; Q9BWT1
2603	CDCA7L	HGNC:30777; Q96GN5
2604	CDCA8	HGNC:14629; Q53HL2
2605	CDCP1	HGNC:24357; Q9H5V8
2606	CDCP2	HGNC:27297; Q5VXM1
2607	CDH1	HGNC:1748; P12830
2608	CDH2	HGNC:1759; P19022
2609	CDH3	HGNC:1762; P22223
2610	CDH4	HGNC:1763; P55283
2611	CDH5	HGNC:1764; P33151
2612	CDH6	HGNC:1765; P55285
2613	CDH7	HGNC:1766; Q9ULB5
2614	CDH8	HGNC:1767; P55286
2615	CDH9	HGNC:1768; Q9ULB4
2616	CDH10	HGNC:1749; Q9Y6N8
2617	CDH11	HGNC:1750; P55287
2618	CDH12	HGNC:1751; P55289
2619	CDH13	HGNC:1753; P55290
2620	CDH15	HGNC:1754; P55291
2621	CDH16	HGNC:1755; O75309
2622	CDH17	HGNC:1756; Q12864
2623	CDH18	HGNC:1757; Q13634
2624	CDH19	HGNC:1758; Q9H159
2625	CDH20	HGNC:1760; Q9HBT6
2626	CDH22	HGNC:13251; Q9UJ99
2627	CDH23	HGNC:13733; Q9H251
2628	CDH24	HGNC:14265; Q86UP0
2629	CDH26	HGNC:15902; Q8IXH8
2630	CDHR1	HGNC:14550; Q96JP9
2631	CDHR2	HGNC:18231; Q9BYE9
2632	CDHR3	HGNC:26308; Q6ZTQ4
2633	CDHR4	HGNC:34527; A6H8M9
2634	CDHR5	HGNC:7521; Q9HBB8
2635	CDIN1	HGNC:26929; Q9Y2V0
2636	CDIP1	HGNC:13234; Q9H305
2637	CDIPT	HGNC:1769; O14735
2638	CDK1	HGNC:1722; P06493
2639	CDK2	HGNC:1771; P24941
2640	CDK2AP1	HGNC:14002; O14519
2641	CDK2AP2	HGNC:30833; O75956
2642	CDK3	HGNC:1772; Q00526
2643	CDK4	HGNC:1773; P11802
2644	CDK5	HGNC:1774; Q00535
2645	CDK5R1	HGNC:1775; Q15078
2646	CDK5R2	HGNC:1776; Q13319
2647	CDK5RAP1	HGNC:15880; Q96SZ6
2648	CDK5RAP2	HGNC:18672; Q96SN8
2649	CDK5RAP3	HGNC:18673; Q96JB5
2650	CDK6	HGNC:1777; Q00534
2651	CDK7	HGNC:1778; P50613
2652	CDK8	HGNC:1779; P49336
2653	CDK9	HGNC:1780; P50750
2654	CDK10	HGNC:1770; Q15131
2655	CDK11A	HGNC:1730; Q9UQ88
2656	CDK11B	HGNC:1729; P21127
2657	CDK12	HGNC:24224; Q9NYV4
2658	CDK13	HGNC:1733; Q14004
2659	CDK14	HGNC:8883; O94921
2660	CDK15	HGNC:14434; Q96Q40
2661	CDK16	HGNC:8749; Q00536
2662	CDK17	HGNC:8750; Q00537
2663	CDK18	HGNC:8751; Q07002
2664	CDK19	HGNC:19338; Q9BWU1
2665	CDK20	HGNC:21420; Q8IZL9
2666	CDKAL1	HGNC:21050; Q5VV42
2667	CDKL1	HGNC:1781; Q00532
2668	CDKL2	HGNC:1782; Q92772
2669	CDKL3	HGNC:15483; Q8IVW4
2670	CDKL4	HGNC:19287; Q5MAI5
2671	CDKL5	HGNC:11411; O76039
2672	CDKN1A	HGNC:1784; P38936
2673	CDKN1B	HGNC:1785; P46527
2674	CDKN1C	HGNC:1786; P49918
2675	CDKN2A	HGNC:1787; P42771, Q8N726
2676	CDKN2AIP	HGNC:24325; Q9NXV6
2677	CDKN2AIPNL	HGNC:30545; Q96HQ2
2678	CDKN2B	HGNC:1788; P42772
2679	CDKN2C	HGNC:1789; P42773
2680	CDKN2D	HGNC:1790; P55273
2681	CDKN3	HGNC:1791; Q16667
2682	CDNF	HGNC:24913; Q49AH0
2683	CDO1	HGNC:1795; Q16878
2684	CDON	HGNC:17104; Q4KMG0
2685	CDPF1	HGNC:33710; Q6NVV7
2686	CDR2	HGNC:1799; Q01850
2687	CDR2L	HGNC:29999; Q86X02
2688	CDRT4	HGNC:14383; Q8N9R6
2689	CDRT15	HGNC:14395; Q96T59
2690	CDRT15L2	HGNC:34075; A8MXV6
2691	CDS1	HGNC:1800; Q92903
2692	CDS2	HGNC:1801; O95674
2693	CDSN	HGNC:1802; Q15517
2694	CDT1	HGNC:24576; Q9H211
2695	CDV3	HGNC:26928; Q9UKY7
2696	CDX1	HGNC:1805; P47902
2697	CDX2	HGNC:1806; Q99626
2698	CDX4	HGNC:1808; O14627
2699	CDY1	HGNC:1809; Q9Y6F8
2700	CDY1B	HGNC:23920; Q9Y6F8
2701	CDY2A	HGNC:1810; Q9Y6F7
2702	CDY2B	HGNC:23921; Q9Y6F7
2703	CDYL	HGNC:1811; Q9Y232
2704	CDYL2	HGNC:23030; Q8N8U2
2705	CEACAM1	HGNC:1814; P13688
2706	CEACAM3	HGNC:1815; P40198
2707	CEACAM4	HGNC:1816; O75871
2708	CEACAM5	HGNC:1817; P06731
2709	CEACAM6	HGNC:1818; P40199
2710	CEACAM7	HGNC:1819; Q14002
2711	CEACAM8	HGNC:1820; P31997
2712	CEACAM16	HGNC:31948; Q2WEN9
2713	CEACAM18	HGNC:31949; A8MTB9
2714	CEACAM19	HGNC:31951; Q7Z692
2715	CEACAM20	HGNC:24879; Q6UY09
2716	CEACAM21	HGNC:28834; Q3KPI0
2717	CEBPA	HGNC:1833; P49715
2718	CEBPB	HGNC:1834; P17676
2719	CEBPD	HGNC:1835; P49716
2720	CEBPE	HGNC:1836; Q15744
2721	CEBPG	HGNC:1837; P53567
2722	CEBPZ	HGNC:24218; Q03701
2723	CEBPZOS	HGNC:49288; A8MTT3
2724	CECR2	HGNC:1840; Q9BXF3
2725	CEL	HGNC:1848; P19835
2726	CELA1	HGNC:3308; Q9UNI1
2727	CELA2A	HGNC:24609; P08217
2728	CELA2B	HGNC:29995; P08218
2729	CELA3A	HGNC:15944; P09093
2730	CELA3B	HGNC:15945; P08861
2731	CELF1	HGNC:2549; Q92879
2732	CELF2	HGNC:2550; O95319
2733	CELF3	HGNC:11967; Q5SZQ8
2734	CELF4	HGNC:14015; Q9BZC1
2735	CELF5	HGNC:14058; Q8N6W0
2736	CELF6	HGNC:14059; Q96J87
2737	CELSR1	HGNC:1850; Q9NYQ6
2738	CELSR2	HGNC:3231; Q9HCU4
2739	CELSR3	HGNC:3230; Q9NYQ7
2740	CEMIP	HGNC:29213; Q8WUJ3
2741	CEMIP2	HGNC:11869; Q9UHN6
2742	CEMP1	HGNC:32553; Q6PRD7
2743	CENATAC	HGNC:30460; Q86UT8
2744	CEND1	HGNC:24153; Q8N111
2745	CENPA	HGNC:1851; P49450
2746	CENPB	HGNC:1852; P07199
2747	CENPC	HGNC:1854; Q03188
2748	CENPE	HGNC:1856; Q02224
2749	CENPF	HGNC:1857; P49454
2750	CENPH	HGNC:17268; Q9H3R5
2751	CENPI	HGNC:3968; Q92674
2752	CENPK	HGNC:29479; Q9BS16
2753	CENPL	HGNC:17879; Q8N0S6
2754	CENPM	HGNC:18352; Q9NSP4
2755	CENPN	HGNC:30873; Q96H22
2756	CENPO	HGNC:28152; Q9BU64
2757	CENPP	HGNC:32933; Q6IPU0
2758	CENPQ	HGNC:21347; Q7L2Z9
2759	CENPS	HGNC:23163; Q8N2Z9
2760	CENPT	HGNC:25787; Q96BT3
2761	CENPU	HGNC:21348; Q71F23
2762	CENPV	HGNC:29920; Q7Z7K6
2763	CENPVL1	HGNC:31851; A0A0U1RR11
2764	CENPVL2	HGNC:43879; P0DPI3
2765	CENPVL3	HGNC:43880; A0A0U1RRI6
2766	CENPW	HGNC:21488; Q5EE01
2767	CENPX	HGNC:11422; A8MT69
2768	CEP15	HGNC:25024; Q9HBI5
2769	CEP19	HGNC:28209; Q96LK0
2770	CEP20	HGNC:26435; Q96NB1
2771	CEP41	HGNC:12370; Q9BYV8
2772	CEP43	HGNC:17012; O95684
2773	CEP44	HGNC:29356; Q9C0F1
2774	CEP55	HGNC:1161; Q53EZ4
2775	CEP57	HGNC:30794; Q86XR8
2776	CEP57L1	HGNC:21561; Q8IYX8
2777	CEP63	HGNC:25815; Q96MT8
2778	CEP68	HGNC:29076; Q76N32
2779	CEP70	HGNC:29972; Q8NHQ1
2780	CEP72	HGNC:25547; Q9P209
2781	CEP76	HGNC:25727; Q8TAP6
2782	CEP78	HGNC:25740; Q5JTW2
2783	CEP83	HGNC:17966; Q9Y592
2784	CEP85	HGNC:25309; Q6P2H3
2785	CEP85L	HGNC:21638; Q5SZL2
2786	CEP89	HGNC:25907; Q96ST8
2787	CEP95	HGNC:25141; Q96GE4
2788	CEP97	HGNC:26244; Q8IW35
2789	CEP104	HGNC:24866; O60308
2790	CEP112	HGNC:28514; Q8N8E3
2791	CEP120	HGNC:26690; Q8N960
2792	CEP126	HGNC:29264; Q9P2H0
2793	CEP128	HGNC:20359; Q6ZU80
2794	CEP131	HGNC:29511; Q9UPN4
2795	CEP135	HGNC:29086; Q66GS9
2796	CEP152	HGNC:29298; O94986
2797	CEP162	HGNC:21107; Q5TB80
2798	CEP164	HGNC:29182; Q9UPV0
2799	CEP170	HGNC:28920; Q5SW79
2800	CEP170B	HGNC:20362; Q9Y4F5
2801	CEP192	HGNC:25515; Q8TEP8
2802	CEP250	HGNC:1859; Q9BV73
2803	CEP290	HGNC:29021; O15078
2804	CEP295	HGNC:29366; Q9C0D2
2805	CEP295NL	HGNC:44659; Q96MC4
2806	CEP350	HGNC:24238; Q5VT06
2807	CEPT1	HGNC:24289; Q9Y6K0
2808	CER1	HGNC:1862; O95813
2809	CERCAM	HGNC:23723; Q5T4B2
2810	CERK	HGNC:19256; Q8TCT0
2811	CERKL	HGNC:21699; Q49MI3
2812	CERS1	HGNC:14253; P27544
2813	CERS2	HGNC:14076; Q96G23
2814	CERS3	HGNC:23752; Q8IU89
2815	CERS4	HGNC:23747; Q9HA82
2816	CERS5	HGNC:23749; Q8N5B7
2817	CERS6	HGNC:23826; Q6ZMG9
2818	CERT1	HGNC:2205; Q9Y5P4
2819	CES1	HGNC:1863; P23141
2820	CES2	HGNC:1864; O00748
2821	CES3	HGNC:1865; Q6UWW8
2822	CES4A	HGNC:26741; Q5XG92
2823	CES5A	HGNC:26459; Q6NT32
2824	CETN1	HGNC:1866; Q12798
2825	CETN2	HGNC:1867; P41208
2826	CETN3	HGNC:1868; O15182
2827	CETP	HGNC:1869; P11597
2828	CFAP20	HGNC:29523; Q9Y6A4
2829	CFAP20DC	HGNC:24763; Q6ZVT6
2830	CFAP36	HGNC:30540; Q96G28
2831	CFAP43	HGNC:26684; Q8NDM7
2832	CFAP44	HGNC:25631; Q96MT7
2833	CFAP45	HGNC:17229; Q9UL16
2834	CFAP46	HGNC:25247; Q8IYW2
2835	CFAP47	HGNC:26708; Q6ZTR5
2836	CFAP52	HGNC:16053; Q8N1V2
2837	CFAP53	HGNC:26530; Q96M91
2838	CFAP54	HGNC:26456; Q96N23
2839	CFAP57	HGNC:26485; Q96MR6
2840	CFAP58	HGNC:26676; Q5T655
2841	CFAP61	HGNC:15872; Q8NHU2
2842	CFAP65	HGNC:25325; Q6ZU64
2843	CFAP68	HGNC:1163; Q9H5F2
2844	CFAP69	HGNC:26107; A5D8W1
2845	CFAP70	HGNC:30726; Q5T0N1
2846	CFAP73	HGNC:37100; A6NFT4
2847	CFAP74	HGNC:29368; Q9C0B2
2848	CFAP77	HGNC:33776; Q6ZQR2
2849	CFAP90	HGNC:27028; A4QMS7
2850	CFAP91	HGNC:24010; Q7Z4T9
2851	CFAP92	HGNC:29231; Q9ULG3
2852	CFAP95	HGNC:31422; Q5VTT2
2853	CFAP96	HGNC:34346; A7E2U8
2854	CFAP97	HGNC:29276; Q9P2B7
2855	CFAP97D1	HGNC:37241; B2RV13
2856	CFAP97D2	HGNC:53789; A0A1B0GU71
2857	CFAP99	HGNC:51180; D6REC4
2858	CFAP100	HGNC:26842; Q494V2
2859	CFAP107	HGNC:28567; Q8N1D5
2860	CFAP119	HGNC:28078; A1A4V9
2861	CFAP126	HGNC:32325; Q5VTH2
2862	CFAP141	HGNC:32305; Q5VU69
2863	CFAP144	HGNC:34347; A6NL82
2864	CFAP157	HGNC:27843; Q5JU67
2865	CFAP161	HGNC:26782; Q6P656
2866	CFAP184	HGNC:26900; Q2M329
2867	CFAP206	HGNC:21405; Q8IYR0
2868	CFAP210	HGNC:25064; Q0VFZ6
2869	CFAP221	HGNC:33720; Q4G0U5
2870	CFAP251	HGNC:28506; Q8TBY9
2871	CFAP263	HGNC:25002; Q9H0I3
2872	CFAP276	HGNC:32331; Q5T5A4
2873	CFAP298	HGNC:1301; P57076
2874	CFAP299	HGNC:28554; Q6V702
2875	CFAP300	HGNC:28188; Q9BRQ4
2876	CFAP410	HGNC:1260; O43822
2877	CFAP418	HGNC:27232; Q96NL8
2878	CFB	HGNC:1037; P00751
2879	CFC1	HGNC:18292; P0CG37
2880	CFC1B	HGNC:33983; P0CG36
2881	CFD	HGNC:2771; P00746
2882	CFDP1	HGNC:1873; Q9UEE9
2883	CFH	HGNC:4883; P08603
2884	CFHR1	HGNC:4888; Q03591
2885	CFHR2	HGNC:4890; P36980
2886	CFHR3	HGNC:16980; Q02985
2887	CFHR4	HGNC:16979; Q92496
2888	CFHR5	HGNC:24668; Q9BXR6
2889	CFI	HGNC:5394; P05156
2890	CFL1	HGNC:1874; P23528
2891	CFL2	HGNC:1875; Q9Y281
2892	CFLAR	HGNC:1876; O15519
2893	CFP	HGNC:8864; P27918
2894	CFTR	HGNC:1884; P13569
2895	CGA	HGNC:1885; P01215
2896	CGAS	HGNC:21367; Q8N884
2897	CGB1	HGNC:16721; A6NKQ9
2898	CGB2	HGNC:16722; Q6NT52
2899	CGB3	HGNC:1886; P0DN86
2900	CGB5	HGNC:16452; P0DN86
2901	CGB7	HGNC:16451; P0DN87
2902	CGB8	HGNC:16453; P0DN86
2903	CGGBP1	HGNC:1888; Q9UFW8
2904	CGN	HGNC:17429; Q9P2M7
2905	CGNL1	HGNC:25931; Q0VF96
2906	CGREF1	HGNC:16962; Q99674
2907	CGRRF1	HGNC:15528; Q99675
2908	CH25H	HGNC:1907; O95992
2909	CHAC1	HGNC:28680; Q9BUX1
2910	CHAC2	HGNC:32363; Q8WUX2
2911	CHAD	HGNC:1909; O15335
2912	CHADL	HGNC:25165; Q6NUI6
2913	CHAF1A	HGNC:1910; Q13111
2914	CHAF1B	HGNC:1911; Q13112
2915	CHAMP1	HGNC:20311; Q96JM3
2916	CHAT	HGNC:1912; P28329
2917	CHCHD1	HGNC:23518; Q96BP2
2918	CHCHD2	HGNC:21645; Q9Y6H1
2919	CHCHD3	HGNC:21906; Q9NX63
2920	CHCHD4	HGNC:26467; Q8N4Q1
2921	CHCHD5	HGNC:17840; Q9BSY4
2922	CHCHD6	HGNC:28184; Q9BRQ6
2923	CHCHD7	HGNC:28314; Q9BUK0
2924	CHCHD10	HGNC:15559; Q8WYQ3
2925	CHCT1	HGNC:26990; Q86WR6
2926	CHD1	HGNC:1915; O14646
2927	CHD1L	HGNC:1916; Q86WJ1
2928	CHD2	HGNC:1917; O14647
2929	CHD3	HGNC:1918; Q12873
2930	CHD4	HGNC:1919; Q14839
2931	CHD5	HGNC:16816; Q8TDI0
2932	CHD6	HGNC:19057; Q8TD26
2933	CHD7	HGNC:20626; Q9P2D1
2934	CHD8	HGNC:20153; Q9HCK8
2935	CHD9	HGNC:25701; Q3L8U1
2936	CHD9NB	HGNC:53436; A0A1B0GV96
2937	CHDH	HGNC:24288; Q8NE62
2938	CHEK1	HGNC:1925; O14757
2939	CHEK2	HGNC:16627; O96017
2940	CHERP	HGNC:16930; Q8IWX8
2941	CHFR	HGNC:20455; Q96EP1
2942	CHGA	HGNC:1929; P10645
2943	CHGB	HGNC:1930; P05060
2944	CHI3L1	HGNC:1932; P36222
2945	CHI3L2	HGNC:1933; Q15782
2946	CHIA	HGNC:17432; Q9BZP6
2947	CHIC1	HGNC:1934; Q5VXU3
2948	CHIC2	HGNC:1935; Q9UKJ5
2949	CHID1	HGNC:28474; Q9BWS9
2950	CHIT1	HGNC:1936; Q13231
2951	CHKA	HGNC:1937; P35790
2952	CHKB	HGNC:1938; Q9Y259
2953	CHL1	HGNC:1939; O00533
2954	CHLSN	HGNC:22421; Q9BRJ6
2955	CHM	HGNC:1940; P24386
2956	CHML	HGNC:1941; P26374
2957	CHMP1A	HGNC:8740; Q9HD42
2958	CHMP1B	HGNC:24287; Q7LBR1
2959	CHMP2A	HGNC:30216; O43633
2960	CHMP2B	HGNC:24537; Q9UQN3
2961	CHMP3	HGNC:29865; Q9Y3E7
2962	CHMP4A	HGNC:20274; Q9BY43
2963	CHMP4B	HGNC:16171; Q9H444
2964	CHMP4C	HGNC:30599; Q96CF2
2965	CHMP5	HGNC:26942; Q9NZZ3
2966	CHMP6	HGNC:25675; Q96FZ7
2967	CHMP7	HGNC:28439; Q8WUX9
2968	CHN1	HGNC:1943; P15882
2969	CHN2	HGNC:1944; P52757
2970	CHODL	HGNC:17807; Q9H9P2
2971	CHORDC1	HGNC:14525; Q9UHD1
2972	CHP1	HGNC:17433; Q99653
2973	CHP2	HGNC:24927; O43745
2974	CHPF	HGNC:24291; Q8IZ52
2975	CHPF2	HGNC:29270; Q9P2E5
2976	CHPT1	HGNC:17852; Q8WUD6
2977	CHRAC1	HGNC:13544; Q9NRG0
2978	CHRD	HGNC:1949; Q9H2X0
2979	CHRDL1	HGNC:29861; Q9BU40
2980	CHRDL2	HGNC:24168; Q6WN34
2981	CHRFAM7A	HGNC:15781; Q494W8
2982	CHRM1	HGNC:1950; P11229
2983	CHRM2	HGNC:1951; P08172
2984	CHRM3	HGNC:1952; P20309
2985	CHRM4	HGNC:1953; P08173
2986	CHRM5	HGNC:1954; P08912
2987	CHRNA1	HGNC:1955; P02708
2988	CHRNA2	HGNC:1956; Q15822
2989	CHRNA3	HGNC:1957; P32297
2990	CHRNA4	HGNC:1958; P43681
2991	CHRNA5	HGNC:1959; P30532
2992	CHRNA6	HGNC:15963; Q15825
2993	CHRNA7	HGNC:1960; P36544
2994	CHRNA9	HGNC:14079; Q9UGM1
2995	CHRNA10	HGNC:13800; Q9GZZ6
2996	CHRNB1	HGNC:1961; P11230
2997	CHRNB2	HGNC:1962; P17787
2998	CHRNB3	HGNC:1963; Q05901
2999	CHRNB4	HGNC:1964; P30926
3000	CHRND	HGNC:1965; Q07001
3001	CHRNE	HGNC:1966; Q04844
3002	CHRNG	HGNC:1967; P07510
3003	CHST1	HGNC:1969; O43916
3004	CHST2	HGNC:1970; Q9Y4C5
3005	CHST3	HGNC:1971; Q7LGC8
3006	CHST4	HGNC:1972; Q8NCG5
3007	CHST5	HGNC:1973; Q9GZS9
3008	CHST6	HGNC:6938; Q9GZX3
3009	CHST7	HGNC:13817; Q9NS84
3010	CHST8	HGNC:15993; Q9H2A9
3011	CHST9	HGNC:19898; Q7L1S5
3012	CHST10	HGNC:19650; O43529
3013	CHST11	HGNC:17422; Q9NPF2
3014	CHST12	HGNC:17423; Q9NRB3
3015	CHST13	HGNC:21755; Q8NET6
3016	CHST14	HGNC:24464; Q8NCH0
3017	CHST15	HGNC:18137; Q7LFX5
3018	CHSY1	HGNC:17198; Q86X52
3019	CHSY3	HGNC:24293; Q70JA7
3020	CHTF8	HGNC:24353; P0CG13
3021	CHTF18	HGNC:18435; Q8WVB6
3022	CHTOP	HGNC:24511; Q9Y3Y2
3023	CHUK	HGNC:1974; O15111
3024	CHURC1	HGNC:20099; Q8WUH1
3025	CIAO1	HGNC:14280; O76071
3026	CIAO2A	HGNC:26235; Q9H5X1
3027	CIAO2B	HGNC:24261; Q9Y3D0
3028	CIAO3	HGNC:14179; Q9H6Q4
3029	CIAPIN1	HGNC:28050; Q6FI81
3030	CIART	HGNC:25200; Q8N365
3031	CIB1	HGNC:16920; Q99828
3032	CIB2	HGNC:24579; O75838
3033	CIB3	HGNC:24580; Q96Q77
3034	CIB4	HGNC:33703; A0PJX0
3035	CIBAR1	HGNC:30452; A1XBS5
3036	CIBAR2	HGNC:24781; Q6ZTR7
3037	CIC	HGNC:14214; Q96RK0
3038	CIDEA	HGNC:1976; O60543
3039	CIDEB	HGNC:1977; Q9UHD4
3040	CIDEC	HGNC:24229; Q96AQ7
3041	CIITA	HGNC:7067; P33076
3042	CILK1	HGNC:21219; Q9UPZ9
3043	CILP	HGNC:1980; O75339
3044	CILP2	HGNC:24213; Q8IUL8
3045	CIMAP1A	HGNC:19905; Q96PU9
3046	CIMAP1B	HGNC:34388; A8MYP8
3047	CIMAP1C	HGNC:28735; Q8IXM7
3048	CIMAP1D	HGNC:26841; Q3SX64
3049	CIMAP2	HGNC:26854; Q3ZCV2
3050	CIMAP3	HGNC:27009; Q8TCI5
3051	CIMIP1	HGNC:16216; Q9H1P6
3052	CIMIP2A	HGNC:33818; Q6J272
3053	CIMIP2B	HGNC:34242; A8MTA8
3054	CIMIP2C	HGNC:27938; A6NJV1
3055	CIMIP3	HGNC:55126; X6R8D5
3056	CIMIP4	HGNC:28568; O43247
3057	CIMIP5	HGNC:26324; Q96LR7
3058	CIMIP6	HGNC:26861; Q8N5S3
3059	CIMIP7	HGNC:44666; H3BNL1
3060	CINP	HGNC:23789; Q9BW66
3061	CIP2A	HGNC:29302; Q8TCG1
3062	CIPC	HGNC:20365; Q9C0C6
3063	CIRBP	HGNC:1982; Q14011
3064	CIROP	HGNC:53647; A0A1B0GTW7
3065	CIROZ	HGNC:26730; Q8N9H9
3066	CIRSR	HGNC:24217; Q86X95
3067	CISD1	HGNC:30880; Q9NZ45
3068	CISD2	HGNC:24212; Q8N5K1
3069	CISD3	HGNC:27578; P0C7P0
3070	CISH	HGNC:1984; Q9NSE2
3071	CIST1	HGNC:55823; A0A2R8Y7Y5
3072	CIT	HGNC:1985; O14578
3073	CITED1	HGNC:1986; Q99966
3074	CITED2	HGNC:1987; Q99967
3075	CITED4	HGNC:18696; Q96RK1
3076	CIZ1	HGNC:16744; Q9ULV3
3077	CKAP2	HGNC:1990; Q8WWK9
3078	CKAP2L	HGNC:26877; Q8IYA6
3079	CKAP4	HGNC:16991; Q07065
3080	CKAP5	HGNC:28959; Q14008
3081	CKB	HGNC:1991; P12277
3082	CKLF	HGNC:13253; Q9UBR5
3083	CKM	HGNC:1994; P06732
3084	CKMT1A	HGNC:31736; P12532
3085	CKMT1B	HGNC:1995; P12532
3086	CKMT2	HGNC:1996; P17540
3087	CKS1B	HGNC:19083; P61024
3088	CKS2	HGNC:2000; P33552
3089	CLASP1	HGNC:17088; Q7Z460
3090	CLASP2	HGNC:17078; O75122
3091	CLASRP	HGNC:17731; Q8N2M8
3092	CLBA1	HGNC:20126; Q96F83
3093	CLC	HGNC:2014; Q05315
3094	CLCA1	HGNC:2015; A8K7I4
3095	CLCA2	HGNC:2016; Q9UQC9
3096	CLCA4	HGNC:2018; Q14CN2
3097	CLCC1	HGNC:29675; Q96S66
3098	CLCF1	HGNC:17412; Q9UBD9
3099	CLCN1	HGNC:2019; P35523
3100	CLCN2	HGNC:2020; P51788
3101	CLCN3	HGNC:2021; P51790
3102	CLCN4	HGNC:2022; P51793
3103	CLCN5	HGNC:2023; P51795
3104	CLCN6	HGNC:2024; P51797
3105	CLCN7	HGNC:2025; P51798
3106	CLCNKA	HGNC:2026; P51800
3107	CLCNKB	HGNC:2027; P51801
3108	CLDN1	HGNC:2032; O95832
3109	CLDN2	HGNC:2041; P57739
3110	CLDN3	HGNC:2045; O15551
3111	CLDN4	HGNC:2046; O14493
3112	CLDN5	HGNC:2047; O00501
3113	CLDN6	HGNC:2048; P56747
3114	CLDN7	HGNC:2049; O95471
3115	CLDN8	HGNC:2050; P56748
3116	CLDN9	HGNC:2051; O95484
3117	CLDN10	HGNC:2033; P78369
3118	CLDN11	HGNC:8514; O75508
3119	CLDN12	HGNC:2034; P56749
3120	CLDN14	HGNC:2035; O95500
3121	CLDN15	HGNC:2036; P56746
3122	CLDN16	HGNC:2037; Q9Y5I7
3123	CLDN17	HGNC:2038; P56750
3124	CLDN18	HGNC:2039; P56856
3125	CLDN19	HGNC:2040; Q8N6F1
3126	CLDN20	HGNC:2042; P56880
3127	CLDN22	HGNC:2044; Q8N7P3
3128	CLDN23	HGNC:17591; Q96B33
3129	CLDN24	HGNC:37200; A6NM45
3130	CLDN25	HGNC:37218; C9JDP6
3131	CLDN34	HGNC:51259; H7C241
3132	CLDND1	HGNC:1322; Q9NY35
3133	CLDND2	HGNC:28511; Q8NHS1
3134	CLEC1A	HGNC:24355; Q8NC01
3135	CLEC1B	HGNC:24356; Q9P126
3136	CLEC2A	HGNC:24191; Q6UVW9
3137	CLEC2B	HGNC:2053; Q92478
3138	CLEC2D	HGNC:14351; Q9UHP7
3139	CLEC2L	HGNC:21969; P0C7M8
3140	CLEC3A	HGNC:2052; O75596
3141	CLEC3B	HGNC:11891; P05452
3142	CLEC4A	HGNC:13257; Q9UMR7
3143	CLEC4C	HGNC:13258; Q8WTT0
3144	CLEC4D	HGNC:14554; Q8WXI8
3145	CLEC4E	HGNC:14555; Q9ULY5
3146	CLEC4F	HGNC:25357; Q8N1N0
3147	CLEC4G	HGNC:24591; Q6UXB4
3148	CLEC4M	HGNC:13523; Q9H2X3
3149	CLEC5A	HGNC:2054; Q9NY25
3150	CLEC6A	HGNC:14556; Q6EIG7
3151	CLEC7A	HGNC:14558; Q9BXN2
3152	CLEC9A	HGNC:26705; Q6UXN8
3153	CLEC10A	HGNC:16916; Q8IUN9
3154	CLEC11A	HGNC:10576; Q9Y240
3155	CLEC12A	HGNC:31713; Q5QGZ9
3156	CLEC12B	HGNC:31966; Q2HXU8
3157	CLEC14A	HGNC:19832; Q86T13
3158	CLEC16A	HGNC:29013; Q2KHT3
3159	CLEC17A	HGNC:34520; Q6ZS10
3160	CLEC18A	HGNC:30388; A5D8T8
3161	CLEC18B	HGNC:33849; Q6UXF7
3162	CLEC18C	HGNC:28538; Q8NCF0
3163	CLEC19A	HGNC:34522; Q6UXS0
3164	CLEC20A	HGNC:34521; Q6ZU45
3165	CLECL1	HGNC:24462; Q8IZS7
3166	CLGN	HGNC:2060; O14967
3167	CLHC1	HGNC:26453; Q8NHS4
3168	CLIC1	HGNC:2062; O00299
3169	CLIC2	HGNC:2063; O15247
3170	CLIC3	HGNC:2064; O95833
3171	CLIC4	HGNC:13518; Q9Y696
3172	CLIC5	HGNC:13517; Q9NZA1
3173	CLIC6	HGNC:2065; Q96NY7
3174	CLINT1	HGNC:23186; Q14677
3175	CLIP1	HGNC:10461; P30622
3176	CLIP2	HGNC:2586; Q9UDT6
3177	CLIP3	HGNC:24314; Q96DZ5
3178	CLIP4	HGNC:26108; Q8N3C7
3179	CLK1	HGNC:2068; P49759
3180	CLK2	HGNC:2069; P49760
3181	CLK3	HGNC:2071; P49761
3182	CLK4	HGNC:13659; Q9HAZ1
3183	CLMN	HGNC:19972; Q96JQ2
3184	CLMP	HGNC:24039; Q9H6B4
3185	CLN3	HGNC:2074; Q13286
3186	CLN5	HGNC:2076; O75503
3187	CLN6	HGNC:2077; Q9NWW5
3188	CLN8	HGNC:2079; Q9UBY8
3189	CLNK	HGNC:17438; Q7Z7G1
3190	CLNS1A	HGNC:2080; P54105
3191	CLOCK	HGNC:2082; O15516
3192	CLP1	HGNC:16999; Q92989
3193	CLPB	HGNC:30664; Q9H078
3194	CLPP	HGNC:2084; Q16740
3195	CLPS	HGNC:2085; P04118
3196	CLPSL1	HGNC:21251; A2RUU4
3197	CLPSL2	HGNC:21250; Q6UWE3
3198	CLPTM1	HGNC:2087; O96005
3199	CLPTM1L	HGNC:24308; Q96KA5
3200	CLPX	HGNC:2088; O76031
3201	CLRN1	HGNC:12605; P58418
3202	CLRN2	HGNC:33939; A0PK11
3203	CLRN3	HGNC:20795; Q8NCR9
3204	CLSPN	HGNC:19715; Q9HAW4
3205	CLSTN1	HGNC:17447; O94985
3206	CLSTN2	HGNC:17448; Q9H4D0
3207	CLSTN3	HGNC:18371; Q9BQT9
3208	CLTA	HGNC:2090; P09496
3209	CLTB	HGNC:2091; P09497
3210	CLTC	HGNC:2092; Q00610
3211	CLTCL1	HGNC:2093; P53675
3212	CLTRN	HGNC:29437; Q9HBJ8
3213	CLU	HGNC:2095; P10909
3214	CLUAP1	HGNC:19009; Q96AJ1
3215	CLUH	HGNC:29094; O75153
3216	CLUL1	HGNC:2096; Q15846
3217	CLVS1	HGNC:23139; Q8IUQ0
3218	CLVS2	HGNC:23046; Q5SYC1
3219	CLXN	HGNC:25678; Q9HAE3
3220	CLYBL	HGNC:18355; Q8N0X4
3221	CMA1	HGNC:2097; P23946
3222	CMAS	HGNC:18290; Q8NFW8
3223	CMBL	HGNC:25090; Q96DG6
3224	CMC1	HGNC:28783; Q7Z7K0
3225	CMC2	HGNC:24447; Q9NRP2
3226	CMC4	HGNC:35428; P56277
3227	CMIP	HGNC:24319; Q8IY22
3228	CMKLR1	HGNC:2121; Q99788
3229	CMKLR2	HGNC:4463; P46091
3230	CMPK1	HGNC:18170; P30085
3231	CMPK2	HGNC:27015; Q5EBM0
3232	CMSS1	HGNC:28666; Q9BQ75
3233	CMTM1	HGNC:19172; Q8IZ96
3234	CMTM2	HGNC:19173; Q8TAZ6
3235	CMTM3	HGNC:19174; Q96MX0
3236	CMTM4	HGNC:19175; Q8IZR5
3237	CMTM5	HGNC:19176; Q96DZ9
3238	CMTM6	HGNC:19177; Q9NX76
3239	CMTM7	HGNC:19178; Q96FZ5
3240	CMTM8	HGNC:19179; Q8IZV2
3241	CMTR1	HGNC:21077; Q8N1G2
3242	CMTR2	HGNC:25635; Q8IYT2
3243	CMYA5	HGNC:14305; Q8N3K9
3244	CNBD1	HGNC:26663; Q8NA66
3245	CNBD2	HGNC:16145; Q96M20
3246	CNBP	HGNC:13164; P62633
3247	CNDP1	HGNC:20675; Q96KN2
3248	CNDP2	HGNC:24437; Q96KP4
3249	CNEP1R1	HGNC:26759; Q8N9A8
3250	CNFN	HGNC:30183; Q9BYD5
3251	CNGA1	HGNC:2148; P29973
3252	CNGA2	HGNC:2149; Q16280
3253	CNGA3	HGNC:2150; Q16281
3254	CNGA4	HGNC:2152; Q8IV77
3255	CNGB1	HGNC:2151; Q14028
3256	CNGB3	HGNC:2153; Q9NQW8
3257	CNIH1	HGNC:19431; O95406
3258	CNIH2	HGNC:28744; Q6PI25
3259	CNIH3	HGNC:26802; Q8TBE1
3260	CNIH4	HGNC:25013; Q9P003
3261	CNKSR1	HGNC:19700; Q969H4
3262	CNKSR2	HGNC:19701; Q8WXI2
3263	CNKSR3	HGNC:23034; Q6P9H4
3264	CNMD	HGNC:17005; O75829
3265	CNN1	HGNC:2155; P51911
3266	CNN2	HGNC:2156; Q99439
3267	CNN3	HGNC:2157; Q15417
3268	CNNM1	HGNC:102; Q9NRU3
3269	CNNM2	HGNC:103; Q9H8M5
3270	CNNM3	HGNC:104; Q8NE01
3271	CNNM4	HGNC:105; Q6P4Q7
3272	CNOT1	HGNC:7877; A5YKK6
3273	CNOT2	HGNC:7878; Q9NZN8
3274	CNOT3	HGNC:7879; O75175
3275	CNOT4	HGNC:7880; O95628
3276	CNOT6	HGNC:14099; Q9ULM6
3277	CNOT6L	HGNC:18042; Q96LI5
3278	CNOT7	HGNC:14101; Q9UIV1
3279	CNOT8	HGNC:9207; Q9UFF9
3280	CNOT9	HGNC:10445; Q92600
3281	CNOT10	HGNC:23817; Q9H9A5
3282	CNOT11	HGNC:25217; Q9UKZ1
3283	CNP	HGNC:2158; P09543
3284	CNPPD1	HGNC:25220; Q9BV87
3285	CNPY1	HGNC:27786; Q3B7I2
3286	CNPY2	HGNC:13529; Q9Y2B0
3287	CNPY3	HGNC:11968; Q9BT09
3288	CNPY4	HGNC:28631; Q8N129
3289	CNR1	HGNC:2159; P21554
3290	CNR2	HGNC:2160; P34972
3291	CNRIP1	HGNC:24546; Q96F85
3292	CNST	HGNC:26486; Q6PJW8
3293	CNTD1	HGNC:26847; Q8N815
3294	CNTF	HGNC:2169; P26441
3295	CNTFR	HGNC:2170; P26992
3296	CNTLN	HGNC:23432; Q9NXG0
3297	CNTN1	HGNC:2171; Q12860
3298	CNTN2	HGNC:2172; Q02246
3299	CNTN3	HGNC:2173; Q9P232
3300	CNTN4	HGNC:2174; Q8IWV2
3301	CNTN5	HGNC:2175; O94779
3302	CNTN6	HGNC:2176; Q9UQ52
3303	CNTNAP1	HGNC:8011; P78357
3304	CNTNAP2	HGNC:13830; Q9UHC6
3305	CNTNAP3	HGNC:13834; Q9BZ76
3306	CNTNAP3B	HGNC:32035; Q96NU0
3307	CNTNAP3C	HGNC:53878
3308	CNTNAP4	HGNC:18747; Q9C0A0
3309	CNTNAP5	HGNC:18748; Q8WYK1
3310	CNTRL	HGNC:1858; Q7Z7A1
3311	CNTROB	HGNC:29616; Q8N137
3312	COA1	HGNC:21868; Q9GZY4
3313	COA3	HGNC:24990; Q9Y2R0
3314	COA4	HGNC:24604; Q9NYJ1
3315	COA5	HGNC:33848; Q86WW8
3316	COA6	HGNC:18025; Q5JTJ3
3317	COA7	HGNC:25716; Q96BR5
3318	COA8	HGNC:20492; Q96IL0
3319	COASY	HGNC:29932; Q13057
3320	COBL	HGNC:22199; O75128
3321	COBLL1	HGNC:23571; Q53SF7
3322	COCH	HGNC:2180; O43405
3323	COG1	HGNC:6545; Q8WTW3
3324	COG2	HGNC:6546; Q14746
3325	COG3	HGNC:18619; Q96JB2
3326	COG4	HGNC:18620; Q9H9E3
3327	COG5	HGNC:14857; Q9UP83
3328	COG6	HGNC:18621; Q9Y2V7
3329	COG7	HGNC:18622; P83436
3330	COG8	HGNC:18623; Q96MW5
3331	COIL	HGNC:2184; P38432
3332	COL1A1	HGNC:2197; P02452
3333	COL1A2	HGNC:2198; P08123
3334	COL2A1	HGNC:2200; P02458
3335	COL3A1	HGNC:2201; P02461
3336	COL4A1	HGNC:2202; P02462
3337	COL4A2	HGNC:2203; P08572
3338	COL4A3	HGNC:2204; Q01955
3339	COL4A4	HGNC:2206; P53420
3340	COL4A5	HGNC:2207; P29400
3341	COL4A6	HGNC:2208; Q14031
3342	COL5A1	HGNC:2209; P20908
3343	COL5A2	HGNC:2210; P05997
3344	COL5A3	HGNC:14864; P25940
3345	COL6A1	HGNC:2211; P12109
3346	COL6A2	HGNC:2212; P12110
3347	COL6A3	HGNC:2213; P12111
3348	COL6A5	HGNC:26674; A8TX70
3349	COL6A6	HGNC:27023; A6NMZ7
3350	COL7A1	HGNC:2214; Q02388
3351	COL8A1	HGNC:2215; P27658
3352	COL8A2	HGNC:2216; P25067
3353	COL9A1	HGNC:2217; P20849
3354	COL9A2	HGNC:2218; Q14055
3355	COL9A3	HGNC:2219; Q14050
3356	COL10A1	HGNC:2185; Q03692
3357	COL11A1	HGNC:2186; P12107
3358	COL11A2	HGNC:2187; P13942
3359	COL12A1	HGNC:2188; Q99715
3360	COL13A1	HGNC:2190; Q5TAT6
3361	COL14A1	HGNC:2191; Q05707
3362	COL15A1	HGNC:2192; P39059
3363	COL16A1	HGNC:2193; Q07092
3364	COL17A1	HGNC:2194; Q9UMD9
3365	COL18A1	HGNC:2195; P39060
3366	COL19A1	HGNC:2196; Q14993
3367	COL20A1	HGNC:14670; Q9P218
3368	COL21A1	HGNC:17025; Q96P44
3369	COL22A1	HGNC:22989; Q8NFW1
3370	COL23A1	HGNC:22990; Q86Y22
3371	COL24A1	HGNC:20821; Q17RW2
3372	COL25A1	HGNC:18603; Q9BXS0
3373	COL26A1	HGNC:18038; Q96A83
3374	COL27A1	HGNC:22986; Q8IZC6
3375	COL28A1	HGNC:22442; Q2UY09
3376	COLEC10	HGNC:2220; Q9Y6Z7
3377	COLEC11	HGNC:17213; Q9BWP8
3378	COLEC12	HGNC:16016; Q5KU26
3379	COLGALT1	HGNC:26182; Q8NBJ5
3380	COLGALT2	HGNC:16790; Q8IYK4
3381	COLQ	HGNC:2226; Q9Y215
3382	COMMD1	HGNC:23024; Q8N668
3383	COMMD2	HGNC:24993; Q86X83
3384	COMMD3	HGNC:23332; Q9UBI1
3385	COMMD4	HGNC:26027; Q9H0A8
3386	COMMD5	HGNC:17902; Q9GZQ3
3387	COMMD6	HGNC:24015; Q7Z4G1
3388	COMMD7	HGNC:16223; Q86VX2
3389	COMMD8	HGNC:26036; Q9NX08
3390	COMMD9	HGNC:25014; Q9P000
3391	COMMD10	HGNC:30201; Q9Y6G5
3392	COMP	HGNC:2227; P49747
3393	COMT	HGNC:2228; P21964
3394	COMTD1	HGNC:26309; Q86VU5
3395	COP1	HGNC:17440; Q8NHY2
3396	COPA	HGNC:2230; P53621
3397	COPB1	HGNC:2231; P53618
3398	COPB2	HGNC:2232; P35606
3399	COPE	HGNC:2234; O14579
3400	COPG1	HGNC:2236; Q9Y678
3401	COPG2	HGNC:2237; Q9UBF2
3402	COPRS	HGNC:28848; Q9NQ92
3403	COPS2	HGNC:30747; P61201
3404	COPS3	HGNC:2239; Q9UNS2
3405	COPS4	HGNC:16702; Q9BT78
3406	COPS5	HGNC:2240; Q92905
3407	COPS6	HGNC:21749; Q7L5N1
3408	COPS7A	HGNC:16758; Q9UBW8
3409	COPS7B	HGNC:16760; Q9H9Q2
3410	COPS8	HGNC:24335; Q99627
3411	COPS9	HGNC:21314; Q8WXC6
3412	COPZ1	HGNC:2243; P61923
3413	COPZ2	HGNC:19356; Q9P299
3414	COQ2	HGNC:25223; Q96H96
3415	COQ3	HGNC:18175; Q9NZJ6
3416	COQ4	HGNC:19693; Q9Y3A0
3417	COQ5	HGNC:28722; Q5HYK3
3418	COQ6	HGNC:20233; Q9Y2Z9
3419	COQ7	HGNC:2244; Q99807
3420	COQ8A	HGNC:16812; Q8NI60
3421	COQ8B	HGNC:19041; Q96D53
3422	COQ9	HGNC:25302; O75208
3423	COQ10A	HGNC:26515; Q96MF6
3424	COQ10B	HGNC:25819; Q9H8M1
3425	CORIN	HGNC:19012; Q9Y5Q5
3426	CORO1A	HGNC:2252; P31146
3427	CORO1B	HGNC:2253; Q9BR76
3428	CORO1C	HGNC:2254; Q9ULV4
3429	CORO2A	HGNC:2255; Q92828
3430	CORO2B	HGNC:2256; Q9UQ03
3431	CORO6	HGNC:21356; Q6QEF8
3432	CORO7	HGNC:26161; P57737
3433	CORT	HGNC:2257; O00230
3434	COTL1	HGNC:18304; Q14019
3435	COX4I1	HGNC:2265; P13073
3436	COX4I2	HGNC:16232; Q96KJ9
3437	COX5A	HGNC:2267; P20674
3438	COX5B	HGNC:2269; P10606
3439	COX6A1	HGNC:2277; P12074
3440	COX6A2	HGNC:2279; Q02221
3441	COX6B1	HGNC:2280; P14854
3442	COX6B2	HGNC:24380; Q6YFQ2
3443	COX6C	HGNC:2285; P09669
3444	COX7A1	HGNC:2287; P24310
3445	COX7A2	HGNC:2288; P14406
3446	COX7A2L	HGNC:2289; O14548
3447	COX7B	HGNC:2291; P24311
3448	COX7B2	HGNC:24381; Q8TF08
3449	COX7C	HGNC:2292; P15954
3450	COX8A	HGNC:2294; P10176
3451	COX8C	HGNC:24382; Q7Z4L0
3452	COX10	HGNC:2260; Q12887
3453	COX11	HGNC:2261; Q9Y6N1
3454	COX14	HGNC:28216; Q96I36
3455	COX15	HGNC:2263; Q7KZN9
3456	COX16	HGNC:20213; Q9P0S2
3457	COX17	HGNC:2264; Q14061
3458	COX18	HGNC:26801; Q8N8Q8
3459	COX19	HGNC:28074; Q49B96
3460	COX20	HGNC:26970; Q5RI15
3461	COXFA4	HGNC:7687; O00483
3462	COXFA4L2	HGNC:29836; Q9NRX3
3463	COXFA4L3	HGNC:29898; Q9C002
3464	CP	HGNC:2295; P00450
3465	CPA1	HGNC:2296; P15085
3466	CPA2	HGNC:2297; P48052
3467	CPA3	HGNC:2298; P15088
3468	CPA4	HGNC:15740; Q9UI42
3469	CPA5	HGNC:15722; Q8WXQ8
3470	CPA6	HGNC:17245; Q8N4T0
3471	CPAMD8	HGNC:23228; Q8IZJ3
3472	CPAP	HGNC:17272; Q9HC77
3473	CPB1	HGNC:2299; P15086
3474	CPB2	HGNC:2300; Q96IY4
3475	CPD	HGNC:2301; O75976
3476	CPE	HGNC:2303; P16870
3477	CPEB1	HGNC:21744; Q9BZB8
3478	CPEB2	HGNC:21745; Q7Z5Q1
3479	CPEB3	HGNC:21746; Q8NE35
3480	CPEB4	HGNC:21747; Q17RY0
3481	CPED1	HGNC:26159; A4D0V7
3482	CPHXL	HGNC:51815; A0A1W2PPM1
3483	CPHXL2	HGNC:55919; A0A1W2PPK0
3484	CPLANE1	HGNC:25801; Q9H799
3485	CPLANE2	HGNC:28127; Q9BU20
3486	CPLX1	HGNC:2309; O14810
3487	CPLX2	HGNC:2310; Q6PUV4
3488	CPLX3	HGNC:27652; Q8WVH0
3489	CPLX4	HGNC:24330; Q7Z7G2
3490	CPM	HGNC:2311; P14384
3491	CPN1	HGNC:2312; P15169
3492	CPN2	HGNC:2313; P22792
3493	CPNE1	HGNC:2314; Q99829
3494	CPNE2	HGNC:2315; Q96FN4
3495	CPNE3	HGNC:2316; O75131
3496	CPNE4	HGNC:2317; Q96A23
3497	CPNE5	HGNC:2318; Q9HCH3
3498	CPNE6	HGNC:2319; O95741
3499	CPNE7	HGNC:2320; Q9UBL6
3500	CPNE8	HGNC:23498; Q86YQ8
3501	CPNE9	HGNC:24336; Q8IYJ1
3502	CPO	HGNC:21011; Q8IVL8
3503	CPOX	HGNC:2321; P36551
3504	CPPED1	HGNC:25632; Q9BRF8
3505	CPQ	HGNC:16910; Q9Y646
3506	CPS1	HGNC:2323; P31327
3507	CPSF1	HGNC:2324; Q10570
3508	CPSF2	HGNC:2325; Q9P2I0
3509	CPSF3	HGNC:2326; Q9UKF6
3510	CPSF4	HGNC:2327; O95639
3511	CPSF4L	HGNC:33632; A6NMK7
3512	CPSF6	HGNC:13871; Q16630
3513	CPSF7	HGNC:30098; Q8N684
3514	CPT1A	HGNC:2328; P50416
3515	CPT1B	HGNC:2329; Q92523
3516	CPT1C	HGNC:18540; Q8TCG5
3517	CPT2	HGNC:2330; P23786
3518	CPTP	HGNC:28116; Q5TA50
3519	CPVL	HGNC:14399; Q9H3G5
3520	CPXCR1	HGNC:2332; Q8N123
3521	CPXM1	HGNC:15771; Q96SM3
3522	CPXM2	HGNC:26977; Q8N436
3523	CPZ	HGNC:2333; Q66K79
3524	CR1	HGNC:2334; P17927
3525	CR1L	HGNC:2335; Q2VPA4
3526	CR2	HGNC:2336; P20023
3527	CRABP1	HGNC:2338; P29762
3528	CRABP2	HGNC:2339; P29373
3529	CRACD	HGNC:29219; Q6ZU35
3530	CRACDL	HGNC:33454; Q6NV74
3531	CRACR2A	HGNC:28657; Q9BSW2
3532	CRACR2B	HGNC:28703; Q8N4Y2
3533	CRADD	HGNC:2340; P78560
3534	CRAMP1	HGNC:14122; Q96RY5
3535	CRAT	HGNC:2342; P43155
3536	CRB1	HGNC:2343; P82279
3537	CRB2	HGNC:18688; Q5IJ48
3538	CRB3	HGNC:20237; Q9BUF7
3539	CRBN	HGNC:30185; Q96SW2
3540	CRCP	HGNC:17888; O75575
3541	CRCT1	HGNC:29875; Q9UGL9
3542	CREB1	HGNC:2345; P16220
3543	CREB3	HGNC:2347; O43889
3544	CREB3L1	HGNC:18856; Q96BA8
3545	CREB3L2	HGNC:23720; Q70SY1
3546	CREB3L3	HGNC:18855; Q68CJ9
3547	CREB3L4	HGNC:18854; Q8TEY5
3548	CREB5	HGNC:16844; Q02930
3549	CREBBP	HGNC:2348; Q92793
3550	CREBL2	HGNC:2350; O60519
3551	CREBRF	HGNC:24050; Q8IUR6
3552	CREBZF	HGNC:24905; Q9NS37
3553	CREG1	HGNC:2351; O75629
3554	CREG2	HGNC:14272; Q8IUH2
3555	CRELD1	HGNC:14630; Q96HD1
3556	CRELD2	HGNC:28150; Q6UXH1
3557	CREM	HGNC:2352; Q03060
3558	CRH	HGNC:2355; P06850
3559	CRHBP	HGNC:2356; P24387
3560	CRHR1	HGNC:2357; P34998
3561	CRHR2	HGNC:2358; Q13324
3562	CRIM1	HGNC:2359; Q9NZV1
3563	CRIP1	HGNC:2360; P50238
3564	CRIP2	HGNC:2361; P52943
3565	CRIP3	HGNC:17751; Q6Q6R5
3566	CRIPT	HGNC:14312; Q9P021
3567	CRIPTO	HGNC:11701; P13385
3568	CRIPTO3	HGNC:11703; P51864
3569	CRISP1	HGNC:304; P54107
3570	CRISP2	HGNC:12024; P16562
3571	CRISP3	HGNC:16904; P54108
3572	CRISPLD1	HGNC:18206; Q9H336
3573	CRISPLD2	HGNC:25248; Q9H0B8
3574	CRK	HGNC:2362; P46108
3575	CRKL	HGNC:2363; P46109
3576	CRLF1	HGNC:2364; O75462
3577	CRLF2	HGNC:14281; Q9HC73
3578	CRLF3	HGNC:17177; Q8IUI8
3579	CRLS1	HGNC:16148; Q9UJA2
3580	CRMP1	HGNC:2365; Q14194
3581	CRNKL1	HGNC:15762; Q9BZJ0
3582	CRNN	HGNC:1230; Q9UBG3
3583	CROCC	HGNC:21299; Q5TZA2
3584	CROCC2	HGNC:51677; H7BZ55
3585	CROT	HGNC:2366; Q9UKG9
3586	CRP	HGNC:2367; P02741
3587	CRPPA	HGNC:37276; A4D126
3588	CRTAC1	HGNC:14882; Q9NQ79
3589	CRTAM	HGNC:24313; O95727
3590	CRTAP	HGNC:2379; O75718
3591	CRTC1	HGNC:16062; Q6UUV9
3592	CRTC2	HGNC:27301; Q53ET0
3593	CRTC3	HGNC:26148; Q6UUV7
3594	CRX	HGNC:2383; O43186
3595	CRY1	HGNC:2384; Q16526
3596	CRY2	HGNC:2385; Q49AN0
3597	CRYAA	HGNC:2388; P02489
3598	CRYAB	HGNC:2389; P02511
3599	CRYBA1	HGNC:2394; P05813
3600	CRYBA2	HGNC:2395; P53672
3601	CRYBA4	HGNC:2396; P53673
3602	CRYBB1	HGNC:2397; P53674
3603	CRYBB2	HGNC:2398; P43320
3604	CRYBB3	HGNC:2400; P26998
3605	CRYBG1	HGNC:356; Q9Y4K1
3606	CRYBG2	HGNC:17295; Q8N1P7
3607	CRYBG3	HGNC:34427; Q68DQ2
3608	CRYGA	HGNC:2408; P11844
3609	CRYGB	HGNC:2409; P07316
3610	CRYGC	HGNC:2410; P07315
3611	CRYGD	HGNC:2411; P07320
3612	CRYGN	HGNC:20458; Q8WXF5
3613	CRYGS	HGNC:2417; P22914
3614	CRYL1	HGNC:18246; Q9Y2S2
3615	CRYM	HGNC:2418; Q14894
3616	CRYZ	HGNC:2419; Q08257
3617	CRYZL1	HGNC:2420; O95825
3618	CS	HGNC:2422; O75390
3619	CSAD	HGNC:18966; Q9Y600
3620	CSAG1	HGNC:24294; Q6PB30
3621	CSAG2	HGNC:16847; Q9Y5P2
3622	CSAG3	HGNC:26237; Q9Y5P2
3623	CSDC2	HGNC:30359; Q9Y534
3624	CSDE1	HGNC:29905; O75534
3625	CSE1L	HGNC:2431; P55060
3626	CSF1	HGNC:2432; P09603
3627	CSF1R	HGNC:2433; P07333
3628	CSF2	HGNC:2434; P04141
3629	CSF2RA	HGNC:2435; P15509
3630	CSF2RB	HGNC:2436; P32927
3631	CSF3	HGNC:2438; P09919
3632	CSF3R	HGNC:2439; Q99062
3633	CSGALNACT1	HGNC:24290; Q8TDX6
3634	CSGALNACT2	HGNC:24292; Q8N6G5
3635	CSH1	HGNC:2440; P0DML2
3636	CSH2	HGNC:2441; P0DML3
3637	CSHL1	HGNC:2442; Q14406
3638	CSK	HGNC:2444; P41240
3639	CSKMT	HGNC:33113; A8MUP2
3640	CSMD1	HGNC:14026; Q96PZ7
3641	CSMD2	HGNC:19290; Q7Z408
3642	CSMD3	HGNC:19291; Q7Z407
3643	CSN1S1	HGNC:2445; P47710
3644	CSN2	HGNC:2447; P05814
3645	CSN3	HGNC:2446; P07498
3646	CSNK1A1	HGNC:2451; P48729
3647	CSNK1A1L	HGNC:20289; Q8N752
3648	CSNK1D	HGNC:2452; P48730
3649	CSNK1E	HGNC:2453; P49674
3650	CSNK1G1	HGNC:2454; Q9HCP0
3651	CSNK1G2	HGNC:2455; P78368
3652	CSNK1G3	HGNC:2456; Q9Y6M4
3653	CSNK2A1	HGNC:2457; P68400
3654	CSNK2A2	HGNC:2459; P19784
3655	CSNK2A2IP	HGNC:53637; A0A1B0GTH6
3656	CSNK2A3	HGNC:2458; Q8NEV1
3657	CSNK2B	HGNC:2460; P67870
3658	CSPG4	HGNC:2466; Q6UVK1
3659	CSPG5	HGNC:2467; O95196
3660	CSPP1	HGNC:26193; Q1MSJ5
3661	CSRNP1	HGNC:14300; Q96S65
3662	CSRNP2	HGNC:16006; Q9H175
3663	CSRNP3	HGNC:30729; Q8WYN3
3664	CSRP1	HGNC:2469; P21291
3665	CSRP2	HGNC:2470; Q16527
3666	CSRP3	HGNC:2472; P50461
3667	CST1	HGNC:2473; P01037
3668	CST2	HGNC:2474; P09228
3669	CST3	HGNC:2475; P01034
3670	CST4	HGNC:2476; P01036
3671	CST5	HGNC:2477; P28325
3672	CST6	HGNC:2478; Q15828
3673	CST7	HGNC:2479; O76096
3674	CST8	HGNC:2480; O60676
3675	CST9	HGNC:13261; Q5W186
3676	CST9L	HGNC:16233; Q9H4G1
3677	CST11	HGNC:15959; Q9H112
3678	CSTA	HGNC:2481; P01040
3679	CSTB	HGNC:2482; P04080
3680	CSTF1	HGNC:2483; Q05048
3681	CSTF2	HGNC:2484; P33240
3682	CSTF2T	HGNC:17086; Q9H0L4
3683	CSTF3	HGNC:2485; Q12996
3684	CSTL1	HGNC:15958; Q9H114
3685	CSTPP1	HGNC:28720; Q9H6J7
3686	CT45A1	HGNC:33267; Q5HYN5
3687	CT45A2	HGNC:28400; Q5DJT8
3688	CT45A3	HGNC:33268; Q8NHU0
3689	CT45A5	HGNC:33270; P0DMU8
3690	CT45A6	HGNC:33271; P0DMU7
3691	CT45A7	HGNC:51260; P0DMV0
3692	CT45A8	HGNC:51261; P0DMV1
3693	CT45A9	HGNC:51262; P0DMV2
3694	CT45A10	HGNC:51263; P0DMU9
3695	CT47A1	HGNC:33282; Q5JQC4
3696	CT47A2	HGNC:33283; Q5JQC4
3697	CT47A3	HGNC:33284; Q5JQC4
3698	CT47A4	HGNC:33285; Q5JQC4
3699	CT47A5	HGNC:33286; Q5JQC4
3700	CT47A6	HGNC:33287; Q5JQC4
3701	CT47A7	HGNC:33288; Q5JQC4
3702	CT47A8	HGNC:33289; Q5JQC4
3703	CT47A9	HGNC:33290; Q5JQC4
3704	CT47A10	HGNC:33291; Q5JQC4
3705	CT47A11	HGNC:27397; Q5JQC4
3706	CT47A12	HGNC:33292; Q5JQC4
3707	CT47B1	HGNC:33293; P0C2W7
3708	CT47C1	HGNC:53820; A0A0U1RQG5
3709	CT55	HGNC:26047; Q8WUE5
3710	CT83	HGNC:33494; Q5H943
3711	CTAG1A	HGNC:24198; P78358
3712	CTAG1B	HGNC:2491; P78358
3713	CTAG2	HGNC:2492; O75638
3714	CTAGE1	HGNC:24346; Q96RT6, Q9HC47
3715	CTAGE4	HGNC:24772; Q8IX94
3716	CTAGE6	HGNC:28644; Q86UF2
3717	CTAGE8	HGNC:37294; P0CG41
3718	CTAGE9	HGNC:37275; A4FU28
3719	CTAGE15	HGNC:37295; A4D2H0
3720	CTBP1	HGNC:2494; Q13363
3721	CTBP2	HGNC:2495; P56545
3722	CTBS	HGNC:2496; Q01459
3723	CTC1	HGNC:26169; Q2NKJ3
3724	CTCF	HGNC:13723; P49711
3725	CTCFL	HGNC:16234; Q8NI51
3726	CTDNEP1	HGNC:19085; O95476
3727	CTDP1	HGNC:2498; Q9Y5B0
3728	CTDSP1	HGNC:21614; Q9GZU7
3729	CTDSP2	HGNC:17077; O14595
3730	CTDSPL	HGNC:16890; O15194
3731	CTDSPL2	HGNC:26936; Q05D32
3732	CTF1	HGNC:2499; Q16619
3733	CTH	HGNC:2501; P32929
3734	CTHRC1	HGNC:18831; Q96CG8
3735	CTIF	HGNC:23925; O43310
3736	CTLA4	HGNC:2505; P16410
3737	CTNNA1	HGNC:2509; P35221
3738	CTNNA2	HGNC:2510; P26232
3739	CTNNA3	HGNC:2511; Q9UI47
3740	CTNNAL1	HGNC:2512; Q9UBT7
3741	CTNNB1	HGNC:2514; P35222
3742	CTNNBIP1	HGNC:16913; Q9NSA3
3743	CTNNBL1	HGNC:15879; Q8WYA6
3744	CTNND1	HGNC:2515; O60716
3745	CTNND2	HGNC:2516; Q9UQB3
3746	CTNS	HGNC:2518; O60931
3747	CTPS1	HGNC:2519; P17812
3748	CTPS2	HGNC:2520; Q9NRF8
3749	CTR9	HGNC:16850; Q6PD62
3750	CTRB1	HGNC:2521; P17538
3751	CTRB2	HGNC:2522; Q6GPI1
3752	CTRC	HGNC:2523; Q99895
3753	CTRL	HGNC:2524; P40313
3754	CTSA	HGNC:9251; P10619
3755	CTSB	HGNC:2527; P07858
3756	CTSC	HGNC:2528; P53634
3757	CTSD	HGNC:2529; P07339
3758	CTSE	HGNC:2530; P14091
3759	CTSF	HGNC:2531; Q9UBX1
3760	CTSG	HGNC:2532; P08311
3761	CTSH	HGNC:2535; P09668
3762	CTSK	HGNC:2536; P43235
3763	CTSL	HGNC:2537; P07711
3764	CTSO	HGNC:2542; P43234
3765	CTSS	HGNC:2545; P25774
3766	CTSV	HGNC:2538; O60911
3767	CTSW	HGNC:2546; P56202
3768	CTSZ	HGNC:2547; Q9UBR2
3769	CTTN	HGNC:3338; Q14247
3770	CTTNBP2	HGNC:15679; Q8WZ74
3771	CTTNBP2NL	HGNC:25330; Q9P2B4
3772	CTU1	HGNC:29590; Q7Z7A3
3773	CTU2	HGNC:28005; Q2VPK5
3774	CTXN1	HGNC:31108; P60606
3775	CTXN2	HGNC:31109; P0C2S0
3776	CTXN3	HGNC:31110; Q4LDR2
3777	CTXND1	HGNC:50507; A0A1B0GTU2
3778	CTXND2	HGNC:53440; A0A1B0GV90
3779	CUBN	HGNC:2548; O60494
3780	CUEDC1	HGNC:31350; Q9NWM3
3781	CUEDC2	HGNC:28352; Q9H467
3782	CUL1	HGNC:2551; Q13616
3783	CUL2	HGNC:2552; Q13617
3784	CUL3	HGNC:2553; Q13618
3785	CUL4A	HGNC:2554; Q13619
3786	CUL4B	HGNC:2555; Q13620
3787	CUL5	HGNC:2556; Q93034
3788	CUL7	HGNC:21024; Q14999
3789	CUL9	HGNC:15982; Q8IWT3
3790	CUTA	HGNC:21101; O60888
3791	CUTC	HGNC:24271; Q9NTM9
3792	CUX1	HGNC:2557; P39880, Q13948
3793	CUX2	HGNC:19347; O14529
3794	CUZD1	HGNC:17937; Q86UP6
3795	CWC15	HGNC:26939; Q9P013
3796	CWC22	HGNC:29322; Q9HCG8
3797	CWC25	HGNC:25989; Q9NXE8
3798	CWC27	HGNC:10664; Q6UX04
3799	CWF19L1	HGNC:25613; Q69YN2
3800	CWF19L2	HGNC:26508; Q2TBE0
3801	CWH43	HGNC:26133; Q9H720
3802	CX3CL1	HGNC:10647; P78423
3803	CX3CR1	HGNC:2558; P49238
3804	CXADR	HGNC:2559; P78310
3805	CXCL1	HGNC:4602; P09341
3806	CXCL2	HGNC:4603; P19875
3807	CXCL3	HGNC:4604; P19876
3808	CXCL5	HGNC:10642; P42830
3809	CXCL6	HGNC:10643; P80162
3810	CXCL8	HGNC:6025; P10145
3811	CXCL9	HGNC:7098; Q07325
3812	CXCL10	HGNC:10637; P02778
3813	CXCL11	HGNC:10638; O14625
3814	CXCL12	HGNC:10672; P48061
3815	CXCL13	HGNC:10639; O43927
3816	CXCL14	HGNC:10640; O95715
3817	CXCL16	HGNC:16642; Q9H2A7
3818	CXCL17	HGNC:19232; Q6UXB2
3819	CXCR1	HGNC:6026; P25024
3820	CXCR2	HGNC:6027; P25025
3821	CXCR3	HGNC:4540; P49682
3822	CXCR4	HGNC:2561; P61073
3823	CXCR5	HGNC:1060; P32302
3824	CXCR6	HGNC:16647; O00574
3825	CXorf38	HGNC:28589; Q8TB03
3826	CXorf49	HGNC:30891; A8MYA2
3827	CXorf49B	HGNC:34229; A8MYA2
3828	CXorf49C	HGNC:53552
3829	CXorf51A	HGNC:30533; A0A1B0GTR3
3830	CXorf51B	HGNC:42787; P0DPH9
3831	CXorf58	HGNC:26356; Q96LI9
3832	CXorf65	HGNC:33713; A6NEN9
3833	CXorf66	HGNC:33743; Q5JRM2
3834	CXXC1	HGNC:24343; Q9P0U4
3835	CXXC4	HGNC:24593; Q9H2H0
3836	CXXC5	HGNC:26943; Q7LFL8
3837	CYB5A	HGNC:2570; P00167
3838	CYB5B	HGNC:24374; O43169
3839	CYB5D1	HGNC:26516; Q6P9G0
3840	CYB5D2	HGNC:28471; Q8WUJ1
3841	CYB5R1	HGNC:13397; Q9UHQ9
3842	CYB5R2	HGNC:24376; Q6BCY4
3843	CYB5R3	HGNC:2873; P00387
3844	CYB5R4	HGNC:20147; Q7L1T6
3845	CYB5RL	HGNC:32220; Q6IPT4
3846	CYB561	HGNC:2571; P49447
3847	CYB561A3	HGNC:23014; Q8NBI2
3848	CYB561D1	HGNC:26804; Q8N8Q1
3849	CYB561D2	HGNC:30253; O14569
3850	CYBA	HGNC:2577; P13498
3851	CYBB	HGNC:2578; P04839
3852	CYBC1	HGNC:28672; Q9BQA9
3853	CYBRD1	HGNC:20797; Q53TN4
3854	CYC1	HGNC:2579; P08574
3855	CYCS	HGNC:19986; P99999
3856	CYFIP1	HGNC:13759; Q7L576
3857	CYFIP2	HGNC:13760; Q96F07
3858	CYGB	HGNC:16505; Q8WWM9
3859	CYLC1	HGNC:2582; P35663
3860	CYLC2	HGNC:2583; Q14093
3861	CYLD	HGNC:2584; Q9NQC7
3862	CYP1A1	HGNC:2595; P04798
3863	CYP1A2	HGNC:2596; P05177
3864	CYP1B1	HGNC:2597; Q16678
3865	CYP2A6	HGNC:2610; P11509
3866	CYP2A7	HGNC:2611; P20853
3867	CYP2A13	HGNC:2608; Q16696
3868	CYP2B6	HGNC:2615; P20813
3869	CYP2C8	HGNC:2622; P10632
3870	CYP2C9	HGNC:2623; P11712
3871	CYP2C18	HGNC:2620; P33260
3872	CYP2C19	HGNC:2621; P33261
3873	CYP2D6	HGNC:2625; P10635
3874	CYP2D7	HGNC:2624; A0A087X1C5
3875	CYP2E1	HGNC:2631; P05181
3876	CYP2F1	HGNC:2632; P24903
3877	CYP2J2	HGNC:2634; P51589
3878	CYP2R1	HGNC:20580; Q6VVX0
3879	CYP2S1	HGNC:15654; Q96SQ9
3880	CYP2U1	HGNC:20582; Q7Z449
3881	CYP2W1	HGNC:20243; Q8TAV3
3882	CYP3A4	HGNC:2637; P08684
3883	CYP3A5	HGNC:2638; P20815
3884	CYP3A7	HGNC:2640; P24462
3885	CYP3A43	HGNC:17450; Q9HB55
3886	CYP4A11	HGNC:2642; Q02928
3887	CYP4A22	HGNC:20575; Q5TCH4
3888	CYP4B1	HGNC:2644; P13584
3889	CYP4F2	HGNC:2645; P78329
3890	CYP4F3	HGNC:2646; Q08477
3891	CYP4F8	HGNC:2648; P98187
3892	CYP4F11	HGNC:13265; Q9HBI6
3893	CYP4F12	HGNC:18857; Q9HCS2
3894	CYP4F22	HGNC:26820; Q6NT55
3895	CYP4V2	HGNC:23198; Q6ZWL3
3896	CYP4X1	HGNC:20244; Q8N118
3897	CYP4Z1	HGNC:20583; Q86W10
3898	CYP7A1	HGNC:2651; P22680
3899	CYP7B1	HGNC:2652; O75881
3900	CYP8B1	HGNC:2653; Q9UNU6
3901	CYP11A1	HGNC:2590; P05108
3902	CYP11B1	HGNC:2591; P15538
3903	CYP11B2	HGNC:2592; P19099
3904	CYP17A1	HGNC:2593; P05093
3905	CYP19A1	HGNC:2594; P11511
3906	CYP20A1	HGNC:20576; Q6UW02
3907	CYP21A2	HGNC:2600; P08686
3908	CYP24A1	HGNC:2602; Q07973
3909	CYP26A1	HGNC:2603; O43174
3910	CYP26B1	HGNC:20581; Q9NR63
3911	CYP26C1	HGNC:20577; Q6V0L0
3912	CYP27A1	HGNC:2605; Q02318
3913	CYP27B1	HGNC:2606; O15528
3914	CYP27C1	HGNC:33480; Q4G0S4
3915	CYP39A1	HGNC:17449; Q9NYL5
3916	CYP46A1	HGNC:2641; Q9Y6A2
3917	CYP51A1	HGNC:2649; Q16850
3918	CYREN	HGNC:22432; Q9BWK5
3919	CYRIA	HGNC:25373; Q9H0Q0
3920	CYRIB	HGNC:25216; Q9NUQ9
3921	CYS1	HGNC:18525; Q717R9
3922	CYSLTR1	HGNC:17451; Q9Y271
3923	CYSLTR2	HGNC:18274; Q9NS75
3924	CYSRT1	HGNC:30529; A8MQ03
3925	CYSTM1	HGNC:30239; Q9H1C7
3926	CYTH1	HGNC:9501; Q15438
3927	CYTH2	HGNC:9502; Q99418
3928	CYTH3	HGNC:9504; O43739
3929	CYTH4	HGNC:9505; Q9UIA0
3930	CYTIP	HGNC:9506; O60759
3931	CYTL1	HGNC:24435; Q9NRR1
3932	CYYR1	HGNC:16274; Q96J86
3933	CZIB	HGNC:26059; Q9NWV4
3934	D2HGDH	HGNC:28358; Q8N465
3935	DAAM1	HGNC:18142; Q9Y4D1
3936	DAAM2	HGNC:18143; Q86T65
3937	DAB1	HGNC:2661; O75553
3938	DAB2	HGNC:2662; P98082
3939	DAB2IP	HGNC:17294; Q5VWQ8
3940	DACH1	HGNC:2663; Q9UI36
3941	DACH2	HGNC:16814; Q96NX9
3942	DACT1	HGNC:17748; Q9NYF0
3943	DACT2	HGNC:21231; Q5SW24
3944	DACT3	HGNC:30745; Q96B18
3945	DAD1	HGNC:2664; P61803
3946	DAG1	HGNC:2666; Q14118
3947	DAGLA	HGNC:1165; Q9Y4D2
3948	DAGLB	HGNC:28923; Q8NCG7
3949	DALRD3	HGNC:25536; Q5D0E6
3950	DAND5	HGNC:26780; Q8N907
3951	DAO	HGNC:2671; P14920
3952	DAOA	HGNC:21191; P59103
3953	DAP	HGNC:2672; P51397
3954	DAP3	HGNC:2673; P51398
3955	DAPK1	HGNC:2674; P53355
3956	DAPK2	HGNC:2675; Q9UIK4
3957	DAPK3	HGNC:2676; O43293
3958	DAPL1	HGNC:21490; A0PJW8
3959	DAPP1	HGNC:16500; Q9UN19
3960	DARS1	HGNC:2678; P14868
3961	DARS2	HGNC:25538; Q6PI48
3962	DAW1	HGNC:26383; Q8N136
3963	DAXX	HGNC:2681; Q9UER7
3964	DAZ1	HGNC:2682; Q9NQZ3
3965	DAZ2	HGNC:15964; Q13117
3966	DAZ3	HGNC:15965; Q9NR90
3967	DAZ4	HGNC:15966; Q86SG3
3968	DAZAP1	HGNC:2683; Q96EP5
3969	DAZAP2	HGNC:2684; Q15038
3970	DAZL	HGNC:2685; Q92904
3971	DBF4	HGNC:17364; Q9UBU7
3972	DBF4B	HGNC:17883; Q8NFT6
3973	DBH	HGNC:2689; P09172
3974	DBI	HGNC:2690; P07108
3975	DBN1	HGNC:2695; Q16643
3976	DBNDD1	HGNC:28455; Q9H9R9
3977	DBNDD2	HGNC:15881; Q9BQY9
3978	DBNL	HGNC:2696; Q9UJU6
3979	DBP	HGNC:2697; Q10586
3980	DBR1	HGNC:15594; Q9UK59
3981	DBT	HGNC:2698; P11182
3982	DBX1	HGNC:33185; A6NMT0
3983	DBX2	HGNC:33186; Q6ZNG2
3984	DCAF1	HGNC:30911; Q9Y4B6
3985	DCAF4	HGNC:20229; Q8WV16
3986	DCAF4L1	HGNC:27723; Q3SXM0
3987	DCAF4L2	HGNC:26657; Q8NA75
3988	DCAF5	HGNC:20224; Q96JK2
3989	DCAF6	HGNC:30002; Q58WW2
3990	DCAF7	HGNC:30915; P61962
3991	DCAF8	HGNC:24891; Q5TAQ9
3992	DCAF8L1	HGNC:31810; A6NGE4
3993	DCAF8L2	HGNC:31811; P0C7V8
3994	DCAF10	HGNC:23686; Q5QP82
3995	DCAF11	HGNC:20258; Q8TEB1
3996	DCAF12	HGNC:19911; Q5T6F0
3997	DCAF12L1	HGNC:29395; Q5VU92
3998	DCAF12L2	HGNC:32950; Q5VW00
3999	DCAF13	HGNC:24535; Q9NV06
4000	DCAF15	HGNC:25095; Q66K64
4001	DCAF16	HGNC:25987; Q9NXF7
4002	DCAF17	HGNC:25784; Q5H9S7
4003	DCAKD	HGNC:26238; Q8WVC6
4004	DCANP1	HGNC:24459; Q8TF63
4005	DCBLD1	HGNC:21479; Q8N8Z6
4006	DCBLD2	HGNC:24627; Q96PD2
4007	DCC	HGNC:2701; P43146
4008	DCD	HGNC:14669; P81605
4009	DCDC1	HGNC:20625; M0R2J8
4010	DCDC2	HGNC:18141; Q9UHG0
4011	DCDC2B	HGNC:32576; A2VCK2
4012	DCDC2C	HGNC:32696; A8MYV0
4013	DCHS1	HGNC:13681; Q96JQ0
4014	DCHS2	HGNC:23111; Q6V1P9
4015	DCK	HGNC:2704; P27707
4016	DCLK1	HGNC:2700; O15075
4017	DCLK2	HGNC:19002; Q8N568
4018	DCLK3	HGNC:19005; Q9C098
4019	DCLRE1A	HGNC:17660; Q6PJP8
4020	DCLRE1B	HGNC:17641; Q9H816
4021	DCLRE1C	HGNC:17642; Q96SD1
4022	DCN	HGNC:2705; P07585
4023	DCP1A	HGNC:18714; Q9NPI6
4024	DCP1B	HGNC:24451; Q8IZD4
4025	DCP2	HGNC:24452; Q8IU60
4026	DCPH1	HGNC:17872; Q9H993
4027	DCPS	HGNC:29812; Q96C86
4028	DCST1	HGNC:26539; Q5T197
4029	DCST2	HGNC:26562; Q5T1A1
4030	DCSTAMP	HGNC:18549; Q9H295
4031	DCT	HGNC:2709; P40126
4032	DCTD	HGNC:2710; P32321
4033	DCTN1	HGNC:2711; Q14203
4034	DCTN2	HGNC:2712; Q13561
4035	DCTN3	HGNC:2713; O75935
4036	DCTN4	HGNC:15518; Q9UJW0
4037	DCTN5	HGNC:24594; Q9BTE1
4038	DCTN6	HGNC:16964; O00399
4039	DCTPP1	HGNC:28777; Q9H773
4040	DCUN1D1	HGNC:18184; Q96GG9
4041	DCUN1D2	HGNC:20328; Q6PH85
4042	DCUN1D3	HGNC:28734; Q8IWE4
4043	DCUN1D4	HGNC:28998; Q92564
4044	DCUN1D5	HGNC:28409; Q9BTE7
4045	DCX	HGNC:2714; O43602
4046	DCXR	HGNC:18985; Q7Z4W1
4047	DDA1	HGNC:28360; Q9BW61
4048	DDAH1	HGNC:2715; O94760
4049	DDAH2	HGNC:2716; O95865
4050	DDB1	HGNC:2717; Q16531
4051	DDB2	HGNC:2718; Q92466
4052	DDC	HGNC:2719; P20711
4053	DDHD1	HGNC:19714; Q8NEL9
4054	DDHD2	HGNC:29106; O94830
4055	DDI1	HGNC:18961; Q8WTU0
4056	DDI2	HGNC:24578; Q5TDH0
4057	DDIAS	HGNC:26351; Q8IXT1
4058	DDIT3	HGNC:2726; P0DPQ6, P35638
4059	DDIT4	HGNC:24944; Q9NX09
4060	DDIT4L	HGNC:30555; Q96D03
4061	DDN	HGNC:24458; O94850
4062	DDO	HGNC:2727; Q99489
4063	DDOST	HGNC:2728; P39656
4064	DDR1	HGNC:2730; Q08345
4065	DDR2	HGNC:2731; Q16832
4066	DDRGK1	HGNC:16110; Q96HY6
4067	DDT	HGNC:2732; P30046
4068	DDTL	HGNC:33446; A6NHG4
4069	DDX1	HGNC:2734; Q92499
4070	DDX3X	HGNC:2745; O00571
4071	DDX3Y	HGNC:2699; O15523
4072	DDX4	HGNC:18700; Q9NQI0
4073	DDX5	HGNC:2746; P17844
4074	DDX6	HGNC:2747; P26196
4075	DDX10	HGNC:2735; Q13206
4076	DDX11	HGNC:2736; Q96FC9
4077	DDX11L13	HGNC:37112
4078	DDX17	HGNC:2740; Q92841
4079	DDX18	HGNC:2741; Q9NVP1
4080	DDX19A	HGNC:25628; Q9NUU7
4081	DDX19B	HGNC:2742; Q9UMR2
4082	DDX20	HGNC:2743; Q9UHI6
4083	DDX21	HGNC:2744; Q9NR30
4084	DDX23	HGNC:17347; Q9BUQ8
4085	DDX24	HGNC:13266; Q9GZR7
4086	DDX25	HGNC:18698; Q9UHL0
4087	DDX27	HGNC:15837; Q96GQ7
4088	DDX28	HGNC:17330; Q9NUL7
4089	DDX31	HGNC:16715; Q9H8H2
4090	DDX39A	HGNC:17821; O00148
4091	DDX39B	HGNC:13917; Q13838
4092	DDX41	HGNC:18674; Q9UJV9
4093	DDX42	HGNC:18676; Q86XP3
4094	DDX43	HGNC:18677; Q9NXZ2
4095	DDX46	HGNC:18681; Q7L014
4096	DDX47	HGNC:18682; Q9H0S4
4097	DDX49	HGNC:18684; Q9Y6V7
4098	DDX50	HGNC:17906; Q9BQ39
4099	DDX51	HGNC:20082; Q8N8A6
4100	DDX52	HGNC:20038; Q9Y2R4
4101	DDX53	HGNC:20083; Q86TM3
4102	DDX54	HGNC:20084; Q8TDD1
4103	DDX55	HGNC:20085; Q8NHQ9
4104	DDX56	HGNC:18193; Q9NY93
4105	DDX59	HGNC:25360; Q5T1V6
4106	DDX60	HGNC:25942; Q8IY21
4107	DDX60L	HGNC:26429; Q5H9U9
4108	DEAF1	HGNC:14677; O75398
4109	DECR1	HGNC:2753; Q16698
4110	DECR2	HGNC:2754; Q9NUI1
4111	DEDD	HGNC:2755; O75618
4112	DEDD2	HGNC:24450; Q8WXF8
4113	DEF6	HGNC:2760; Q9H4E7
4114	DEF8	HGNC:25969; Q6ZN54
4115	DEFA1	HGNC:2761; P59665
4116	DEFA1B	HGNC:33596; P59665
4117	DEFA3	HGNC:2762; P59666
4118	DEFA4	HGNC:2763; P12838
4119	DEFA5	HGNC:2764; Q01523
4120	DEFA6	HGNC:2765; Q01524
4121	DEFB1	HGNC:2766; P60022
4122	DEFB4A	HGNC:2767; O15263
4123	DEFB4B	HGNC:30193; O15263
4124	DEFB103A	HGNC:15967; P81534
4125	DEFB103B	HGNC:31702; P81534
4126	DEFB104A	HGNC:18115; Q8WTQ1
4127	DEFB104B	HGNC:26165; Q8WTQ1
4128	DEFB105A	HGNC:18087; Q8NG35
4129	DEFB105B	HGNC:29930; Q8NG35
4130	DEFB106A	HGNC:18088; Q8N104
4131	DEFB106B	HGNC:28879; Q8N104
4132	DEFB107A	HGNC:18086; Q8IZN7
4133	DEFB107B	HGNC:31918; Q8IZN7
4134	DEFB108B	HGNC:29966; Q8NET1
4135	DEFB109B	HGNC:33469; Q30KR1
4136	DEFB109C	HGNC:43844; P0DY27
4137	DEFB109D	HGNC:30838; P0DY26
4138	DEFB110	HGNC:18091; Q30KQ9
4139	DEFB112	HGNC:18093; Q30KQ8
4140	DEFB113	HGNC:18094; Q30KQ7
4141	DEFB114	HGNC:18095; Q30KQ6
4142	DEFB115	HGNC:18096; Q30KQ5
4143	DEFB116	HGNC:18097; Q30KQ4
4144	DEFB118	HGNC:16196; Q96PH6
4145	DEFB119	HGNC:18099; Q8N690
4146	DEFB121	HGNC:18101; Q5J5C9
4147	DEFB123	HGNC:18103; Q8N688
4148	DEFB124	HGNC:18104; Q8NES8
4149	DEFB125	HGNC:18105; Q8N687
4150	DEFB126	HGNC:15900; Q9BYW3
4151	DEFB127	HGNC:16206; Q9H1M4
4152	DEFB128	HGNC:18106; Q7Z7B8
4153	DEFB129	HGNC:16218; Q9H1M3
4154	DEFB130A	HGNC:18107; P0DP74
4155	DEFB130B	HGNC:39814; P0DP73
4156	DEFB131A	HGNC:18108; P59861
4157	DEFB131B	HGNC:38058; A0A096LNP1
4158	DEFB132	HGNC:33806; Q7Z7B7
4159	DEFB134	HGNC:32399; Q4QY38
4160	DEFB135	HGNC:32400; Q30KP9
4161	DEFB136	HGNC:34433; Q30KP8
4162	DEGS1	HGNC:13709; O15121
4163	DEGS2	HGNC:20113; Q6QHC5
4164	DEK	HGNC:2768; P35659
4165	DELE1	HGNC:28969; Q14154
4166	DENND1A	HGNC:29324; Q8TEH3
4167	DENND1B	HGNC:28404; Q6P3S1
4168	DENND1C	HGNC:26225; Q8IV53
4169	DENND2A	HGNC:22212; Q9ULE3
4170	DENND2B	HGNC:11350; P78524
4171	DENND2C	HGNC:24748; Q68D51
4172	DENND2D	HGNC:26192; Q9H6A0
4173	DENND3	HGNC:29134; A2RUS2
4174	DENND4A	HGNC:24321; Q7Z401
4175	DENND4B	HGNC:29044; O75064
4176	DENND4C	HGNC:26079; Q5VZ89
4177	DENND5A	HGNC:19344; Q6IQ26
4178	DENND5B	HGNC:28338; Q6ZUT9
4179	DENND6A	HGNC:26635; Q8IWF6
4180	DENND6B	HGNC:32690; Q8NEG7
4181	DENND10	HGNC:31793; Q8TCE6
4182	DENND11	HGNC:29472; A4D1U4
4183	DENR	HGNC:2769; O43583
4184	DEPDC1	HGNC:22949; Q5TB30
4185	DEPDC1B	HGNC:24902; Q8WUY9
4186	DEPDC4	HGNC:22952; Q8N2C3
4187	DEPDC5	HGNC:18423; O75140
4188	DEPDC7	HGNC:29899; Q96QD5
4189	DEPP1	HGNC:23355; Q9NTK1
4190	DEPTOR	HGNC:22953; Q8TB45
4191	DERA	HGNC:24269; Q9Y315
4192	DERL1	HGNC:28454; Q9BUN8
4193	DERL2	HGNC:17943; Q9GZP9
4194	DERL3	HGNC:14236; Q96Q80
4195	DERPC	HGNC:54084; P0CG12
4196	DES	HGNC:2770; P17661
4197	DESI1	HGNC:24577; Q6ICB0
4198	DESI2	HGNC:24264; Q9BSY9
4199	DET1	HGNC:25477; Q7L5Y6
4200	DEUP1	HGNC:26344; Q05D60
4201	DEXI	HGNC:13267; O95424
4202	DFFA	HGNC:2772; O00273
4203	DFFB	HGNC:2773; O76075
4204	DGAT1	HGNC:2843; O75907
4205	DGAT2	HGNC:16940; Q96PD7
4206	DGAT2L6	HGNC:23250; Q6ZPD8
4207	DGCR2	HGNC:2845; P98153
4208	DGCR6	HGNC:2846; Q14129
4209	DGCR6L	HGNC:18551; Q9BY27
4210	DGCR8	HGNC:2847; Q8WYQ5
4211	DGKA	HGNC:2849; P23743
4212	DGKB	HGNC:2850; Q9Y6T7
4213	DGKD	HGNC:2851; Q16760
4214	DGKE	HGNC:2852; P52429
4215	DGKG	HGNC:2853; P49619
4216	DGKH	HGNC:2854; Q86XP1
4217	DGKI	HGNC:2855; O75912
4218	DGKK	HGNC:32395; Q5KSL6
4219	DGKQ	HGNC:2856; P52824
4220	DGKZ	HGNC:2857; Q13574
4221	DGLUCY	HGNC:20498; Q7Z3D6
4222	DGUOK	HGNC:2858; Q16854
4223	DHCR7	HGNC:2860; Q9UBM7
4224	DHCR24	HGNC:2859; Q15392
4225	DHDDS	HGNC:20603; Q86SQ9
4226	DHDH	HGNC:17887; Q9UQ10
4227	DHFR	HGNC:2861; P00374
4228	DHFR2	HGNC:27309; Q86XF0
4229	DHH	HGNC:2865; O43323
4230	DHODH	HGNC:2867; Q02127
4231	DHPS	HGNC:2869; P49366
4232	DHRS1	HGNC:16445; Q96LJ7
4233	DHRS2	HGNC:18349; Q13268
4234	DHRS3	HGNC:17693; O75911
4235	DHRS4	HGNC:16985; Q9BTZ2
4236	DHRS4L2	HGNC:19731; Q6PKH6
4237	DHRS7	HGNC:21524; Q9Y394
4238	DHRS7B	HGNC:24547; Q6IAN0
4239	DHRS7C	HGNC:32423; A6NNS2
4240	DHRS9	HGNC:16888; Q9BPW9
4241	DHRS11	HGNC:28639; Q6UWP2
4242	DHRS12	HGNC:25832; A0PJE2
4243	DHRS13	HGNC:28326; Q6UX07
4244	DHRSX	HGNC:18399; Q8N5I4
4245	DHTKD1	HGNC:23537; Q96HY7
4246	DHX8	HGNC:2749; Q14562
4247	DHX9	HGNC:2750; Q08211
4248	DHX15	HGNC:2738; O43143
4249	DHX16	HGNC:2739; O60231
4250	DHX29	HGNC:15815; Q7Z478
4251	DHX30	HGNC:16716; Q7L2E3
4252	DHX32	HGNC:16717; Q7L7V1
4253	DHX33	HGNC:16718; Q9H6R0
4254	DHX34	HGNC:16719; Q14147
4255	DHX35	HGNC:15861; Q9H5Z1
4256	DHX36	HGNC:14410; Q9H2U1
4257	DHX37	HGNC:17210; Q8IY37
4258	DHX38	HGNC:17211; Q92620
4259	DHX40	HGNC:18018; Q8IX18
4260	DHX57	HGNC:20086; Q6P158
4261	DHX58	HGNC:29517; Q96C10
4262	DIABLO	HGNC:21528; Q9NR28
4263	DIAPH1	HGNC:2876; O60610
4264	DIAPH2	HGNC:2877; O60879
4265	DIAPH3	HGNC:15480; Q9NSV4
4266	DICER1	HGNC:17098; Q9UPY3
4267	DIDO1	HGNC:2680; Q9BTC0
4268	DIMT1	HGNC:30217; Q9UNQ2
4269	DIO1	HGNC:2883; P49895
4270	DIO2	HGNC:2884; Q92813
4271	DIO3	HGNC:2885; P55073
4272	DIP2A	HGNC:17217; Q14689
4273	DIP2B	HGNC:29284; Q9P265
4274	DIP2C	HGNC:29150; Q9Y2E4
4275	DIPK1A	HGNC:32213; Q5T7M9
4276	DIPK1B	HGNC:28290; Q5VUD6
4277	DIPK1C	HGNC:31729; Q0P6D2
4278	DIPK2A	HGNC:28490; Q8NDZ4
4279	DIPK2B	HGNC:25866; Q9H7Y0
4280	DIRAS1	HGNC:19127; O95057
4281	DIRAS2	HGNC:19323; Q96HU8
4282	DIRAS3	HGNC:687; O95661
4283	DIS3	HGNC:20604; Q9Y2L1
4284	DIS3L	HGNC:28698; Q8TF46
4285	DIS3L2	HGNC:28648; Q8IYB7
4286	DISC1	HGNC:2888; Q9NRI5
4287	DISP1	HGNC:19711; Q96F81
4288	DISP2	HGNC:19712; A7MBM2
4289	DISP3	HGNC:29251; Q9P2K9
4290	DIXDC1	HGNC:23695; Q155Q3
4291	DKC1	HGNC:2890; O60832
4292	DKK1	HGNC:2891; O94907
4293	DKK2	HGNC:2892; Q9UBU2
4294	DKK3	HGNC:2893; Q9UBP4
4295	DKK4	HGNC:2894; Q9UBT3
4296	DKKL1	HGNC:16528; Q9UK85
4297	DLAT	HGNC:2896; P10515
4298	DLC1	HGNC:2897; Q96QB1
4299	DLD	HGNC:2898; P09622
4300	DLEC1	HGNC:2899; Q9Y238
4301	DLEU7	HGNC:17567; Q6UYE1
4302	DLG1	HGNC:2900; Q12959
4303	DLG2	HGNC:2901; Q15700
4304	DLG3	HGNC:2902; Q92796
4305	DLG4	HGNC:2903; P78352
4306	DLG5	HGNC:2904; Q8TDM6
4307	DLGAP1	HGNC:2905; O14490
4308	DLGAP2	HGNC:2906; Q9P1A6
4309	DLGAP3	HGNC:30368; O95886
4310	DLGAP4	HGNC:24476; Q9Y2H0
4311	DLGAP5	HGNC:16864; Q15398
4312	DLK1	HGNC:2907; P80370
4313	DLK2	HGNC:21113; Q6UY11
4314	DLL1	HGNC:2908; O00548
4315	DLL3	HGNC:2909; Q9NYJ7
4316	DLL4	HGNC:2910; Q9NR61
4317	DLST	HGNC:2911; P36957
4318	DLX1	HGNC:2914; P56177
4319	DLX2	HGNC:2915; Q07687
4320	DLX3	HGNC:2916; O60479
4321	DLX4	HGNC:2917; Q92988
4322	DLX5	HGNC:2918; P56178
4323	DLX6	HGNC:2919; P56179
4324	DMAC1	HGNC:30536; Q96GE9
4325	DMAC2	HGNC:25496; Q9NW81
4326	DMAC2L	HGNC:18799; Q99766
4327	DMAP1	HGNC:18291; Q9NPF5
4328	DMBT1	HGNC:2926; Q9UGM3
4329	DMBX1	HGNC:19026; Q8NFW5
4330	DMC1	HGNC:2927; Q14565
4331	DMD	HGNC:2928; P11532
4332	DMGDH	HGNC:24475; Q9UI17
4333	DMKN	HGNC:25063; Q6E0U4
4334	DMP1	HGNC:2932; Q13316
4335	DMPK	HGNC:2933; Q09013
4336	DMRT1	HGNC:2934; Q9Y5R6
4337	DMRT2	HGNC:2935; Q9Y5R5
4338	DMRT3	HGNC:13909; Q9NQL9
4339	DMRTA1	HGNC:13826; Q5VZB9
4340	DMRTA2	HGNC:13908; Q96SC8
4341	DMRTB1	HGNC:13913; Q96MA1
4342	DMRTC1	HGNC:13910; Q5HYR2
4343	DMRTC1B	HGNC:31686; Q5HYR2
4344	DMRTC2	HGNC:13911; Q8IXT2
4345	DMTF1	HGNC:14603; Q9Y222
4346	DMTN	HGNC:3382; Q08495
4347	DMWD	HGNC:2936; Q09019
4348	DMXL1	HGNC:2937; Q9Y485
4349	DMXL2	HGNC:2938; Q8TDJ6
4350	DNA2	HGNC:2939; P51530
4351	DNAAF1	HGNC:30539; Q8NEP3
4352	DNAAF2	HGNC:20188; Q9NVR5
4353	DNAAF3	HGNC:30492; Q8N9W5
4354	DNAAF4	HGNC:21493; Q8WXU2
4355	DNAAF5	HGNC:26013; Q86Y56
4356	DNAAF6	HGNC:28570; Q9NQM4
4357	DNAAF8	HGNC:25081; Q8IYS4
4358	DNAAF9	HGNC:17721; Q5TEA3
4359	DNAAF10	HGNC:25176; Q96MX6
4360	DNAAF11	HGNC:16725; Q86X45
4361	DNAAF19	HGNC:32700; Q8IW40
4362	DNAH1	HGNC:2940; Q9P2D7
4363	DNAH2	HGNC:2948; Q9P225
4364	DNAH3	HGNC:2949; Q8TD57
4365	DNAH5	HGNC:2950; Q8TE73
4366	DNAH6	HGNC:2951; Q9C0G6
4367	DNAH7	HGNC:18661; Q8WXX0
4368	DNAH8	HGNC:2952; Q96JB1
4369	DNAH9	HGNC:2953; Q9NYC9
4370	DNAH10	HGNC:2941; Q8IVF4
4371	DNAH10OS	HGNC:37121; P0CZ25
4372	DNAH11	HGNC:2942; Q96DT5
4373	DNAH12	HGNC:2943; Q6ZR08
4374	DNAH14	HGNC:2945; Q0VDD8
4375	DNAH17	HGNC:2946; Q9UFH2
4376	DNAI1	HGNC:2954; Q9UI46
4377	DNAI2	HGNC:18744; Q9GZS0
4378	DNAI3	HGNC:30711; Q8IWG1
4379	DNAI4	HGNC:26252; Q5VTH9
4380	DNAI7	HGNC:29599; Q6TDU7
4381	DNAJA1	HGNC:5229; P31689
4382	DNAJA2	HGNC:14884; O60884
4383	DNAJA3	HGNC:11808; Q96EY1
4384	DNAJA4	HGNC:14885; Q8WW22
4385	DNAJB1	HGNC:5270; P25685
4386	DNAJB2	HGNC:5228; P25686
4387	DNAJB4	HGNC:14886; Q9UDY4
4388	DNAJB5	HGNC:14887; O75953
4389	DNAJB6	HGNC:14888; O75190
4390	DNAJB7	HGNC:24986; Q7Z6W7
4391	DNAJB8	HGNC:23699; Q8NHS0
4392	DNAJB9	HGNC:6968; Q9UBS3
4393	DNAJB11	HGNC:14889; Q9UBS4
4394	DNAJB12	HGNC:14891; Q9NXW2
4395	DNAJB13	HGNC:30718; P59910
4396	DNAJB14	HGNC:25881; Q8TBM8
4397	DNAJC1	HGNC:20090; Q96KC8
4398	DNAJC2	HGNC:13192; Q99543
4399	DNAJC3	HGNC:9439; Q13217
4400	DNAJC4	HGNC:5271; Q9NNZ3
4401	DNAJC5	HGNC:16235; Q9H3Z4
4402	DNAJC5B	HGNC:24138; Q9UF47
4403	DNAJC5G	HGNC:24844; Q8N7S2
4404	DNAJC6	HGNC:15469; O75061
4405	DNAJC7	HGNC:12392; Q99615
4406	DNAJC8	HGNC:15470; O75937
4407	DNAJC9	HGNC:19123; Q8WXX5
4408	DNAJC10	HGNC:24637; Q8IXB1
4409	DNAJC11	HGNC:25570; Q9NVH1
4410	DNAJC12	HGNC:28908; Q9UKB3
4411	DNAJC13	HGNC:30343; O75165
4412	DNAJC14	HGNC:24581; Q6Y2X3
4413	DNAJC15	HGNC:20325; Q9Y5T4
4414	DNAJC16	HGNC:29157; Q9Y2G8
4415	DNAJC17	HGNC:25556; Q9NVM6
4416	DNAJC18	HGNC:28429; Q9H819
4417	DNAJC19	HGNC:30528; Q96DA6
4418	DNAJC21	HGNC:27030; Q5F1R6
4419	DNAJC22	HGNC:25802; Q8N4W6
4420	DNAJC24	HGNC:26979; Q6P3W2
4421	DNAJC25	HGNC:34187; Q9H1X3
4422	DNAJC27	HGNC:30290; Q9NZQ0
4423	DNAJC28	HGNC:1297; Q9NX36
4424	DNAJC30	HGNC:16410; Q96LL9
4425	DNAL1	HGNC:23247; Q4LDG9
4426	DNAL4	HGNC:2955; O96015
4427	DNALI1	HGNC:14353; O14645
4428	DNASE1	HGNC:2956; P24855
4429	DNASE1L1	HGNC:2957; P49184
4430	DNASE1L2	HGNC:2958; Q92874
4431	DNASE1L3	HGNC:2959; Q13609
4432	DNASE2	HGNC:2960; O00115
4433	DNASE2B	HGNC:28875; Q8WZ79
4434	DND1	HGNC:23799; Q8IYX4
4435	DNER	HGNC:24456; Q8NFT8
4436	DNHD1	HGNC:26532; Q96M86
4437	DNLZ	HGNC:33879; Q5SXM8
4438	DNM1	HGNC:2972; Q05193
4439	DNM1L	HGNC:2973; O00429
4440	DNM2	HGNC:2974; P50570
4441	DNM3	HGNC:29125; Q9UQ16
4442	DNMBP	HGNC:30373; Q6XZF7
4443	DNMT1	HGNC:2976; P26358
4444	DNMT3A	HGNC:2978; Q9Y6K1
4445	DNMT3B	HGNC:2979; Q9UBC3
4446	DNMT3L	HGNC:2980; Q9UJW3
4447	DNPEP	HGNC:2981; Q9ULA0
4448	DNPH1	HGNC:21218; O43598
4449	DNTT	HGNC:2983; P04053
4450	DNTTIP1	HGNC:16160; Q9H147
4451	DNTTIP2	HGNC:24013; Q5QJE6
4452	DOC2A	HGNC:2985; Q14183
4453	DOC2B	HGNC:2986; Q14184
4454	DOCK1	HGNC:2987; Q14185
4455	DOCK2	HGNC:2988; Q92608
4456	DOCK3	HGNC:2989; Q8IZD9
4457	DOCK4	HGNC:19192; Q8N1I0
4458	DOCK5	HGNC:23476; Q9H7D0
4459	DOCK6	HGNC:19189; Q96HP0
4460	DOCK7	HGNC:19190; Q96N67
4461	DOCK8	HGNC:19191; Q8NF50
4462	DOCK9	HGNC:14132; Q9BZ29
4463	DOCK10	HGNC:23479; Q96BY6
4464	DOCK11	HGNC:23483; Q5JSL3
4465	DOHH	HGNC:28662; Q9BU89
4466	DOK1	HGNC:2990; Q99704
4467	DOK2	HGNC:2991; O60496
4468	DOK3	HGNC:24583; Q7L591
4469	DOK4	HGNC:19868; Q8TEW6
4470	DOK5	HGNC:16173; Q9P104
4471	DOK6	HGNC:28301; Q6PKX4
4472	DOK7	HGNC:26594; Q18PE1
4473	DOLK	HGNC:23406; Q9UPQ8
4474	DOLPP1	HGNC:29565; Q86YN1
4475	DONSON	HGNC:2993; Q9NYP3
4476	DOP1A	HGNC:21194; Q5JWR5
4477	DOP1B	HGNC:1291; Q9Y3R5
4478	DORIP1	HGNC:19834; Q4W4Y0
4479	DOT1L	HGNC:24948; Q8TEK3
4480	DPAGT1	HGNC:2995; Q9H3H5
4481	DPCD	HGNC:24542; Q9BVM2
4482	DPEP1	HGNC:3002; P16444
4483	DPEP2	HGNC:23028; Q9H4A9
4484	DPEP2NB	HGNC:52385; A0A0U1RQF7
4485	DPEP3	HGNC:23029; Q9H4B8
4486	DPF1	HGNC:20225; Q92782
4487	DPF2	HGNC:9964; Q92785
4488	DPF3	HGNC:17427; Q92784
4489	DPH1	HGNC:3003; Q9BZG8
4490	DPH2	HGNC:3004; Q9BQC3
4491	DPH3	HGNC:27717; Q96FX2
4492	DPH5	HGNC:24270; Q9H2P9
4493	DPH6	HGNC:30543; Q7L8W6
4494	DPH7	HGNC:25199; Q9BTV6
4495	DPM1	HGNC:3005; O60762
4496	DPM2	HGNC:3006; O94777
4497	DPM3	HGNC:3007; Q9P2X0
4498	DPP3	HGNC:3008; Q9NY33
4499	DPP4	HGNC:3009; P27487
4500	DPP6	HGNC:3010; P42658
