= CFHR4 =

Protein-coding gene in humans

Identifiers
- Aliases: CFHR4, CFHL4, FHR-4, FHR4, complement factor H related 4
- External IDs: OMIM: 605337; GeneCards: CFHR4

Gene location (Human)
Chr.	Chromosome 1 (human)
Band	1q31.3	Start	196,888,014 bp
Band	1q31.3	End	196,918,713 bp
RNA expression pattern
Bgee	Human / Mouse (ortholog); Top expressed in: right lobe of liver; testicle; gonad; apex of heart; ventricular zone; tibial nerve; lymph node; urinary bladder; superior frontal gyrus; muscle of thigh / n/a; More reference expression data
BioGPS	n/a
Gene ontology
Molecular function	lipid transporter activity
Cellular component	extracellular region
Biological process	lipid transport; regulation of complement activation
Sources:Amigo / QuickGO
Orthologs
Databases	NCBI: entry; OMA: entry
Species	Human	Mouse
Entrez	10877	n/a
Ensembl	ENSG00000134365	n/a
UniProt	Q92496	n/a
RefSeq (mRNA)	NM_001201550; NM_001201551; NM_006684	n/a
RefSeq (protein)	NP_001188479; NP_001188480; NP_006675	n/a
Location (UCSC)	Chr 1: 196.89 – 196.92 Mb	n/a
PubMed search		n/a
- Wikidata
View/Edit Human

Complement factor H-related protein 4 is a protein that in humans is encoded by the CFHR4 gene.
