= CCDC137 =

Protein found in humans

Identifiers
- Aliases: CCDC137, RaRF, Coiled-coil domain, Coiled-coil domain 137, coiled-coil domain containing 137
- External IDs: OMIM: 614271; MGI: 1914541; HomoloGene: 34992; GeneCards: CCDC137; OMA:CCDC137 - orthologs

Gene location (Human)
Chr.	Chromosome 17 (human)
Band	17q25.3	Start	81,666,737 bp
Band	17q25.3	End	81,673,904 bp

Gene location (Mouse)
Chr.	Chromosome 11 (mouse)
Band	11|11 E2	Start	120,348,941 bp
Band	11|11 E2	End	120,355,184 bp
RNA expression pattern
Bgee	Human / Mouse (ortholog); Top expressed in: mucosa of transverse colon; skin of leg; skin of abdomen; granulocyte; spleen; oocyte; ectocervix; appendix; vagina; lymph node / Top expressed in: otic vesicle; saccule; otic placode; fetal liver hematopoietic progenitor cell; yolk sac; gastrula; trachea; epiblast; utricle; embryo; More reference expression data
BioGPS	n/a
Orthologs
Species	Human	Mouse
Entrez	339230	67291
Ensembl	ENSG00000185298	ENSMUSG00000049957
UniProt	Q6PK04	Q8R0K4
RefSeq (mRNA)	NM_199287	NM_152807
RefSeq (protein)	NP_954981	NP_690020
Location (UCSC)	Chr 17: 81.67 – 81.67 Mb	Chr 11: 120.35 – 120.36 Mb
PubMed search
- Wikidata
View/Edit Human	View/Edit Mouse

Coiled-coil domain containing 137 is a protein that in humans is encoded by the CCDC137 gene.
