= DNAJC11 =

Protein-coding gene found in humans

Identifiers
- Aliases: DNAJC11, dJ126A5.1, DnaJ heat shock protein family (Hsp40) member C11
- External IDs: OMIM: 614827; MGI: 2443386; GeneCards: DNAJC11

Gene location (Human)
Chr.	Chromosome 1 (human)
Band	1p36.31	Start	6,634,168 bp
Band	1p36.31	End	6,701,924 bp

Gene location (Mouse)
Chr.	Chromosome 4 (mouse)
Band	4|4 E2	Start	152,018,148 bp
Band	4|4 E2	End	152,066,594 bp
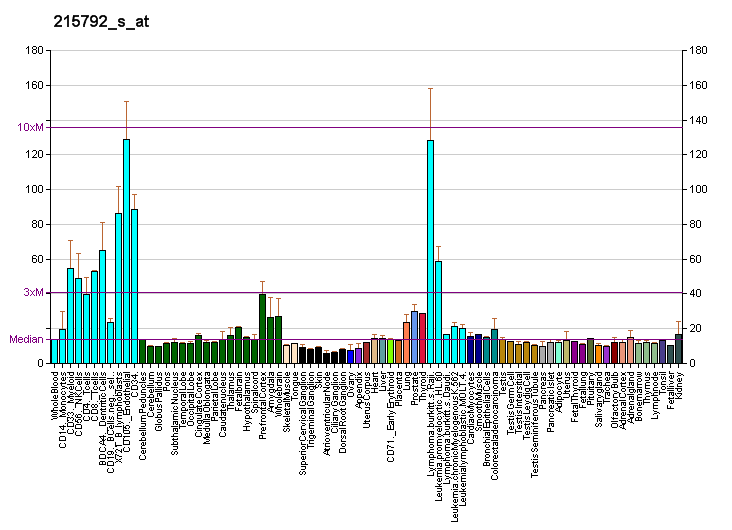
RNA expression pattern
Bgee	Human / Mouse (ortholog); Top expressed in: apex of heart; rectum; mucosa of transverse colon; sural nerve; renal medulla; islet of Langerhans; left ventricle; right adrenal gland; right adrenal cortex; muscle of leg / Top expressed in: primary oocyte; yolk sac; zygote; blastocyst; secondary oocyte; dentate gyrus of hippocampal formation granule cell; tail of embryo; epiblast; ventricular zone; Paneth cell; More reference expression data
BioGPS	More reference expression data
Gene ontology
Molecular function	protein binding
Cellular component	mitochondrion; SAM complex; mitochondrial outer membrane; membrane; MICOS complex
Biological process	cristae formation
Sources:Amigo / QuickGO
Orthologs
Databases	NCBI: entry; OMA: entry
Species	Human	Mouse
Entrez	55735	230935
Ensembl	ENSG00000007923	ENSMUSG00000039768
UniProt	Q9NVH1; Q5TH61	Q5U458
RefSeq (mRNA)	NM_018198	NM_172704
RefSeq (protein)	NP_060668	NP_766292
Location (UCSC)	Chr 1: 6.63 – 6.7 Mb	Chr 4: 152.02 – 152.07 Mb
PubMed search
- Wikidata
View/Edit Human	View/Edit Mouse

DnaJ homolog subfamily C member 11 is a protein that in humans is encoded by the DNAJC11 gene.
