= DIDO1 =

Protein-coding gene in the species Homo sapiens

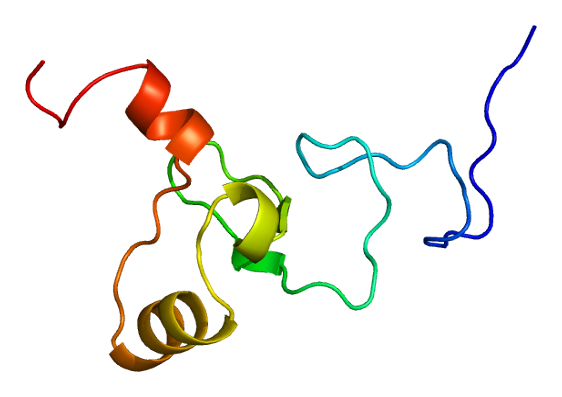

Identifiers
- Aliases: DIDO1, BYE1, C20orf158, DATF-1, DATF1, DIDO2, DIDO3, DIO-1, DIO1, dJ885L7.8, death inducer-obliterator 1
- External IDs: OMIM: 604140; MGI: 1344352; GeneCards: DIDO1
Available structures
PDB	Ortholog search: PDBe RCSB
PDB	List of PDB id codes 2M3H, 4L7X

Gene location (Human)
Chr.	Chromosome 20 (human)
Band	20q13.33	Start	62,877,738 bp
Band	20q13.33	End	62,937,952 bp

Gene location (Mouse)
Chr.	Chromosome 2 (mouse)
Band	2|2 H4	Start	180,299,757 bp
Band	2|2 H4	End	180,351,792 bp
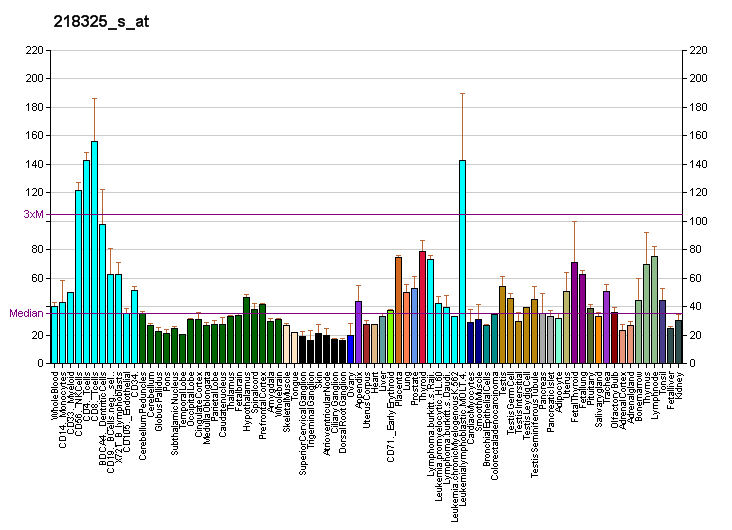
RNA expression pattern
Bgee	Human / Mouse (ortholog); Top expressed in: buccal mucosa cell; sural nerve; right uterine tube; tendon of biceps brachii; body of uterus; Achilles tendon; olfactory zone of nasal mucosa; left ovary; popliteal artery; tibial arteries / Top expressed in: Paneth cell; Rostral migratory stream; atrioventricular valve; maxillary prominence; mandibular prominence; ciliary body; epithelium of lens; medullary collecting duct; primitive streak; retinal pigment epithelium; More reference expression data
BioGPS	More reference expression data
Gene ontology
Molecular function	metal ion binding; RNA binding
Cellular component	cytoplasm; spindle; cytoskeleton; nucleus
Biological process	apoptotic signaling pathway; transcription, DNA-templated; apoptotic process
Sources:Amigo / QuickGO
Orthologs
Databases	NCBI: entry; OMA: entry
Species	Human	Mouse
Entrez	11083	23856
Ensembl	ENSG00000101191	ENSMUSG00000038914
UniProt	Q9BTC0	Q8C9B9
RefSeq (mRNA)	NM_001193369; NM_001193370; NM_022105; NM_033081; NM_080796 NM_080797; NM_152302	NM_001291432; NM_001291433; NM_011805; NM_175551; NM_177852
RefSeq (protein)	NP_001180298; NP_001180299; NP_071388; NP_149072; NP_542986 NP_542987	NP_001278361; NP_001278362; NP_035935; NP_780760; NP_808520
Location (UCSC)	Chr 20: 62.88 – 62.94 Mb	Chr 2: 180.3 – 180.35 Mb
PubMed search
- Wikidata
View/Edit Human	View/Edit Mouse

Death-inducer obliterator 1 is a protein that in humans is encoded by the DIDO1 gene.

== Function ==
Apoptosis, a major form of cell death, is an efficient mechanism for eliminating unwanted cells and is of central importance for development and homeostasis in metazoan animals. In mice, the death inducer-obliterator-1 gene is upregulated by apoptotic signals and encodes a cytoplasmic protein that translocates to the nucleus upon apoptotic signal activation. When overexpressed, the mouse protein induced apoptosis in cell lines growing in vitro. This gene is similar to the mouse gene and therefore is thought to be involved in apoptosis. Alternatively spliced transcripts have been found for this gene, encoding multiple isoforms.
