= DNAJC13 =

Protein-coding gene in the species Homo sapiens

Identifiers
- Aliases: DNAJC13, RME8, PARK21, DnaJ heat shock protein family (Hsp40) member C13
- External IDs: OMIM: 614334; MGI: 2676368; GeneCards: DNAJC13

Gene location (Human)
Chr.	Chromosome 3 (human)
Band	3q22.1	Start	132,417,502 bp
Band	3q22.1	End	132,539,032 bp

Gene location (Mouse)
Chr.	Chromosome 9 (mouse)
Band	9|9 F1	Start	104,028,481 bp
Band	9|9 F1	End	104,140,129 bp
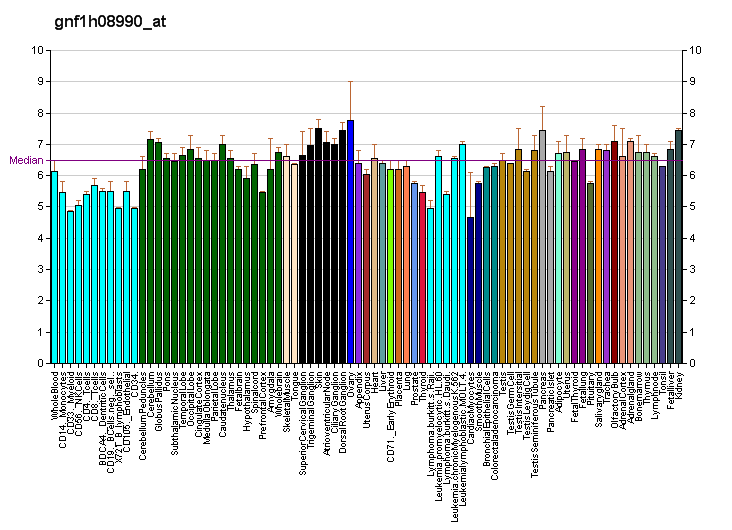

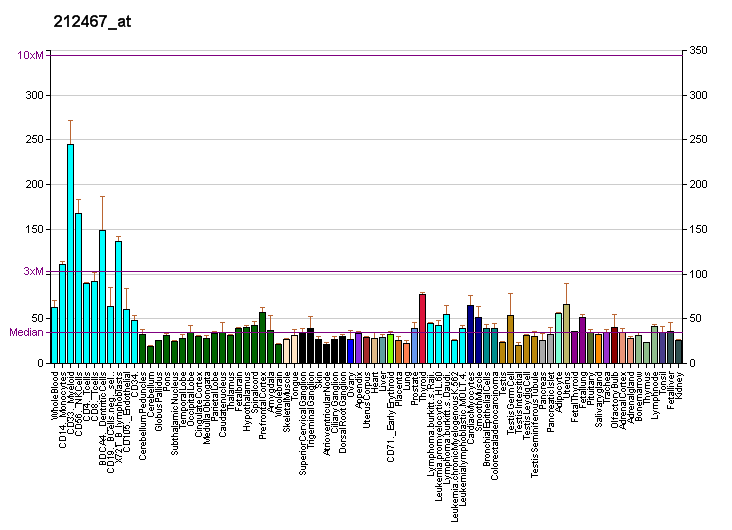
RNA expression pattern
Bgee	Human / Mouse (ortholog); Top expressed in: Achilles tendon; buccal mucosa cell; saphenous vein; trabecular bone; superficial temporal artery; parietal pleura; trigeminal ganglion; epithelium of nasopharynx; tail of epididymis; tibia / Top expressed in: zygote; secondary oocyte; genital tubercle; tail of embryo; cumulus cell; saccule; otic placode; stroma of bone marrow; human kidney; primary oocyte; More reference expression data
BioGPS	More reference expression data
Gene ontology
Molecular function	protein binding
Cellular component	lysosomal membrane; endosome; WASH complex; early endosome membrane; endosome membrane; extracellular exosome; early endosome; membrane; intracellular membrane-bounded organelle; cytosol; plasma membrane; secretory granule membrane; azurophil granule membrane
Biological process	protein transport; regulation of early endosome to late endosome transport; regulation of early endosome to recycling endosome transport; osteoblast differentiation; endosome organization; neutrophil degranulation; receptor-mediated endocytosis; transport
Sources:Amigo / QuickGO
Orthologs
Databases	NCBI: entry; OMA: entry
Species	Human	Mouse
Entrez	23317	235567
Ensembl	ENSG00000138246	ENSMUSG00000032560
UniProt	O75165	n/a
RefSeq (mRNA)	NM_015268; NM_001329126; NM_173823	NM_001163026; NM_001359740
RefSeq (protein)	NP_001316055; NP_056083	n/a
Location (UCSC)	Chr 3: 132.42 – 132.54 Mb	Chr 9: 104.03 – 104.14 Mb
PubMed search
- Wikidata
View/Edit Human	View/Edit Mouse

DnaJ (Hsp40) homolog, subfamily C, member 13, also known as DNAJC13, is a human gene.
