= Centromere protein M =

Protein found in humans

CENPM

Identifiers
- Aliases: CENPM, C22orf18, CENP-M, PANE1, bK250D10.2, centromere protein M
- External IDs: OMIM: 610152; MGI: 1913820; GeneCards: CENPM
Available structures
PDB	Ortholog search: PDBe RCSB
PDB	List of PDB id codes 4P0T, 4WAU

Gene location (Human)
Chr.	Chromosome 22 (human)
Band	22q13.2	Start	41,938,737 bp
Band	22q13.2	End	41,947,152 bp

Gene location (Mouse)
Chr.	Chromosome 15 (mouse)
Band	15|15 E1	Start	82,117,980 bp
Band	15|15 E1	End	82,128,949 bp
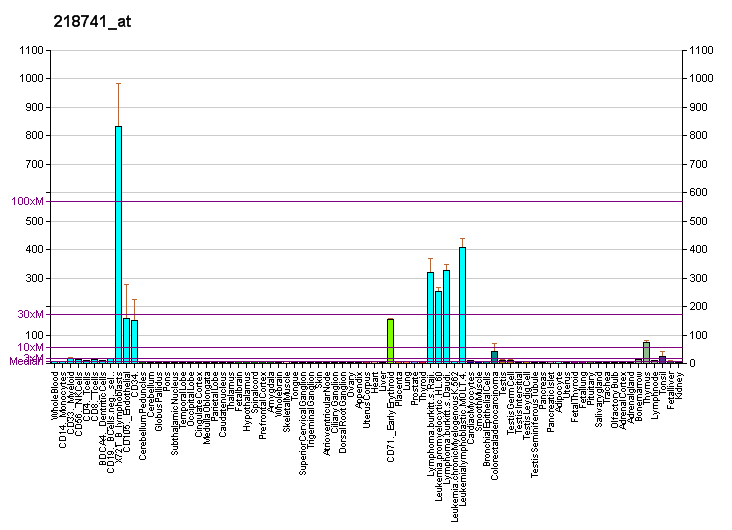
RNA expression pattern
Bgee	Human / Mouse (ortholog); Top expressed in: mucosa of transverse colon; right uterine tube; gonad; ventricular zone; ganglionic eminence; epithelium of bronchus; bronchial epithelial cell; testicle; bone marrow; appendix / Top expressed in: morula; ventricular zone; primary oocyte; secondary oocyte; embryo; embryo; medial ganglionic eminence; zygote; yolk sac; fetal liver hematopoietic progenitor cell; More reference expression data
BioGPS	More reference expression data
Orthologs
Databases	NCBI: entry; OMA: entry
Species	Human	Mouse
Entrez	79019	66570
Ensembl	ENSG00000100162	ENSMUSG00000068101
UniProt	Q9NSP4	Q9CQA0
RefSeq (mRNA)	NM_001002876; NM_001110215; NM_001304370; NM_001304371; NM_001304372 NM_001304373; NM_024053	NM_001080158; NM_025639; NM_178269
RefSeq (protein)	NP_001002876; NP_001103685; NP_001291299; NP_001291300; NP_001291301 NP_001291302; NP_076958	NP_001073627; NP_079915; NP_840000
Location (UCSC)	Chr 22: 41.94 – 41.95 Mb	Chr 15: 82.12 – 82.13 Mb
PubMed search
- Wikidata
View/Edit Human	View/Edit Mouse

Centromere protein M also known as proliferation associated nuclear element 1 (PANE1) is a protein that in humans is encoded by the CENPM gene.

An alternative transcript of the CENPM gene encodes a leukocyte antigen that is selectively expressed in B-lymphoid cells. Centromere protein M is involved in centromere assembly and immune response.
