= DEPP1 =

Protein-coding gene in the species Homo sapiens

An Error has occurred retrieving Wikidata item for infobox Protein DEPP1 also known as decidual protein induced by progesterone (DEPP) and fasting-induced gene protein (FIG) is a protein that in humans is encoded by the DEPP1 gene.

== Function ==
The expression of this gene is induced by fasting as well as by progesterone. The protein encoded by this gene contains a t-synaptosome-associated protein receptor (SNARE) coiled-coil homology domain and a peroxisomal targeting signal. Production of the encoded protein leads to phosphorylation and activation of the transcription factor ELK1.
