= DNAJB9 =

Protein-coding gene in the species Homo sapiens

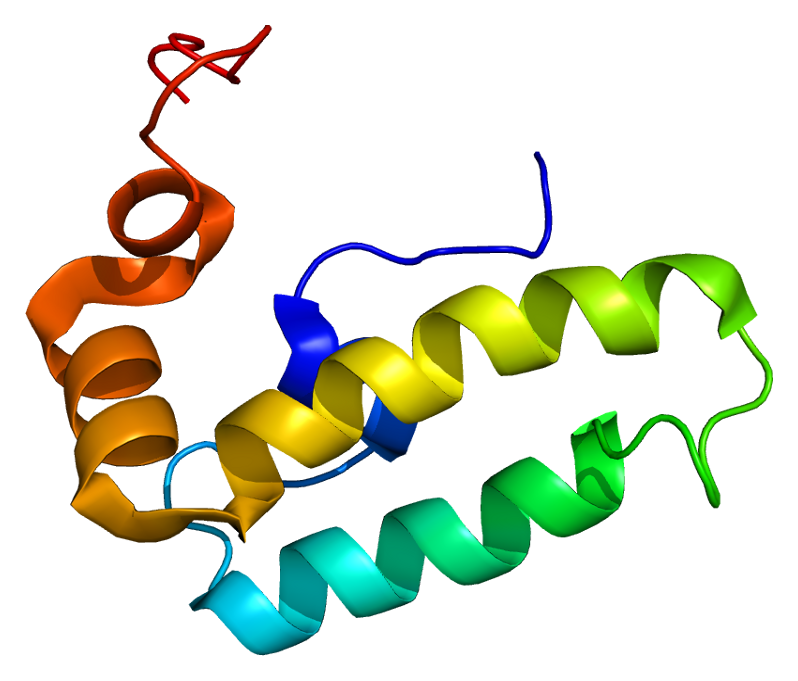

Identifiers
- Aliases: DNAJB9, ERdj4, MDG-1, MDG1, MST049, MSTP049, DnaJ heat shock protein family (Hsp40) member B9
- External IDs: OMIM: 602634; MGI: 1351618; GeneCards: DNAJB9
Available structures
PDB	Ortholog search: PDBe RCSB
PDB	List of PDB id codes 2CTR

Gene location (Human)
Chr.	Chromosome 7 (human)
Band	7q31.1|14q24.2-q24.3	Start	108,569,867 bp
Band	7q31.1|14q24.2-q24.3	End	108,574,850 bp

Gene location (Mouse)
Chr.	Chromosome 12 (mouse)
Band	12|12 B2	Start	44,252,342 bp
Band	12|12 B2	End	44,257,109 bp
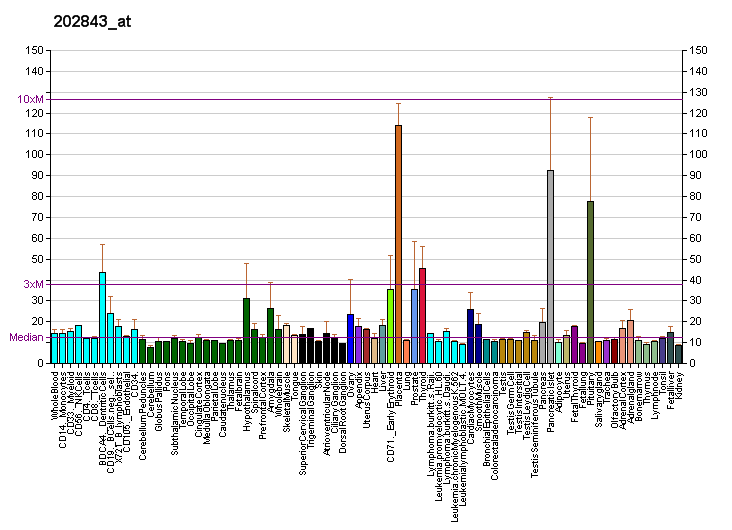

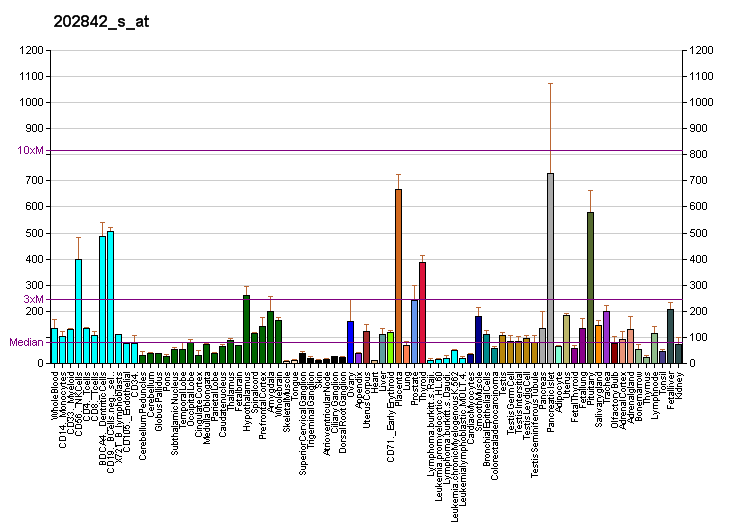
RNA expression pattern
Bgee	Human / Mouse (ortholog); Top expressed in: Epithelium of choroid plexus; cartilage tissue; body of pancreas; kidney tubule; beta cell; germinal epithelium; corpus epididymis; glomerulus; decidua; metanephric glomerulus / Top expressed in: seminal vesicula; islet of Langerhans; gastrula; olfactory epithelium; decidua; parotid gland; ciliary body; median eminence; paraventricular nucleus of hypothalamus; supraoptic nucleus; More reference expression data
BioGPS	More reference expression data
Gene ontology
Molecular function	misfolded protein binding; protein binding; Hsp70 protein binding; chaperone binding
Cellular component	endoplasmic reticulum lumen; endoplasmic reticulum membrane; extracellular exosome; nucleolus; endoplasmic reticulum; cytoplasm
Biological process	IRE1-mediated unfolded protein response; ubiquitin-dependent ERAD pathway; immunoglobulin production; response to unfolded protein; B cell differentiation; response to endoplasmic reticulum stress; negative regulation of IRE1-mediated unfolded protein response
Sources:Amigo / QuickGO
Orthologs
Databases	NCBI: entry; OMA: entry
Species	Human	Mouse
Entrez	4189	27362
Ensembl	ENSG00000128590	ENSMUSG00000014905
UniProt	Q9UBS3	Q9QYI6
RefSeq (mRNA)	NM_012328	NM_013760
RefSeq (protein)	NP_036460	NP_038788
Location (UCSC)	Chr 7: 108.57 – 108.57 Mb	Chr 12: 44.25 – 44.26 Mb
PubMed search
- Wikidata
View/Edit Human	View/Edit Mouse

DnaJ homolog subfamily B member 9 is a protein that in humans is encoded by the DNAJB9 gene.
