= CEP78 =

Protein-coding gene in the species Homo sapiens

Identifiers
- Aliases: CEP78, C9orf81, IP63, centrosomal protein 78, CRDHL
- External IDs: OMIM: 617110; MGI: 1924386; GeneCards: CEP78

Gene location (Human)
Chr.	Chromosome 9 (human)
Band	9q21.2	Start	78,236,062 bp
Band	9q21.2	End	78,279,690 bp

Gene location (Mouse)
Chr.	Chromosome 19 (mouse)
Band	19|19 A	Start	15,933,137 bp
Band	19|19 A	End	15,962,353 bp
RNA expression pattern
Bgee	Human / Mouse (ortholog); Top expressed in: secondary oocyte; buccal mucosa cell; ventricular zone; pancreatic ductal cell; gonad; ganglionic eminence; testicle; granulocyte; right testis; bronchial epithelial cell / Top expressed in: spermatocyte; hand; ventricular zone; tail of embryo; epiblast; secondary oocyte; zygote; neural tube; genital tubercle; primary oocyte; More reference expression data
BioGPS	n/a
Orthologs
Databases	NCBI: entry; OMA: entry
Species	Human	Mouse
Entrez	84131	208518
Ensembl	ENSG00000148019	ENSMUSG00000041491
UniProt	Q5JTW2	Q6IRU7
RefSeq (mRNA)	NM_001098802; NM_032171; NM_001330691; NM_001330693; NM_001330694 NM_001349838; NM_001349839; NM_001349840	NM_198019
RefSeq (protein)	NP_001092272; NP_001317620; NP_001317622; NP_001317623; NP_115547 NP_001336767; NP_001336768; NP_001336769	NP_932136
Location (UCSC)	Chr 9: 78.24 – 78.28 Mb	Chr 19: 15.93 – 15.96 Mb
PubMed search
- Wikidata
View/Edit Human	View/Edit Mouse

Centrosomal protein of 78 kDa, also known as Cep78, is a protein that in humans is encoded by the CEP78 gene.

== Clinical ==
Mutations in this gene have been associated with cone-rod dystrophy with hearing loss.
