= Tight junction protein =

Tight junction protein are proteins that are involved in the formation and functioning of tight junctions; "Tight junction protein" may refer to:

- TJP1, Tight junction protein 1 (ZO-1)
- TJP2, Tight junction protein 2 (ZO-2)
- TJP3, Tight junction protein 3 (ZO-3)

== See also ==
- Gap junction protein
