= Cingulin-like protein 1 =

Protein found in humans

CGNL1

Identifiers
- Aliases: CGNL1, JACOP, Cingulin-like 1, cingulin like 1, PCING
- External IDs: OMIM: 607856; MGI: 1915428; GeneCards: CGNL1

Gene location (Human)
Chr.	Chromosome 15 (human)
Band	15q21.3	Start	57,375,967 bp
Band	15q21.3	End	57,550,717 bp

Gene location (Mouse)
Chr.	Chromosome 9 (mouse)
Band	9|9 D	Start	71,533,791 bp
Band	9|9 D	End	71,678,884 bp
RNA expression pattern
Bgee	Human / Mouse (ortholog); Top expressed in: parotid gland; renal medulla; cardiac muscle tissue of right atrium; skin of arm; human kidney; urethra; myocardium of left ventricle; skin of hip; liver; skin of thigh / Top expressed in: Epithelium of choroid plexus; ciliary body; parotid gland; human kidney; lacrimal gland; submandibular gland; atrioventricular valve; tail of embryo; semi-lunar valve; iris; More reference expression data
BioGPS	n/a
Gene ontology
Molecular function	cytoskeletal motor activity; protein binding
Cellular component	cell junction; myosin complex; bicellular tight junction
Biological process	actin filament organization; negative regulation of small GTPase mediated signal transduction
Sources:Amigo / QuickGO
Orthologs
Databases	NCBI: entry; OMA: entry
Species	Human	Mouse
Entrez	84952	68178
Ensembl	ENSG00000128849	ENSMUSG00000032232
UniProt	Q0VF96	Q6AW69
RefSeq (mRNA)	NM_001252335; NM_032866	NM_026599; NM_001304362
RefSeq (protein)	NP_001239264; NP_116255	NP_001291291; NP_080875; NP_001394786
Location (UCSC)	Chr 15: 57.38 – 57.55 Mb	Chr 9: 71.53 – 71.68 Mb
PubMed search
- Wikidata
View/Edit Human	View/Edit Mouse

Cingulin-like protein 1, also known as paracingulin or junction-associated-coiled-coil protein (JACOP), is a protein which is encoded by the CGNL1 gene.

The paracingulin polypeptide comprises a globular N-terminal "head" domain and an α-helical C-terminal domain which is presumed to form a coiled-coil dimer. Paracingulin is a paralog of cingulin that arose probably from gene duplication. The CGNL1 gene is conserved among different vertebrate species and has not been so far identified in invertebrates. The homology search highlights that paracingulin and cingulin have 39% identity in the rod tail sequences. They possess also two highly homologous regions in their N-terminus "head" domain including the ZIM region (ZO-1 interaction motif).

The etymology of the name cingulin comes from the Latin "cingere" which means « to form a belt around ». Both, cingulin and paracingulin are localized in the cytoplasmic face of tight junctions (TJ). The prefix « para » refers to "paralog". However, immunoelectron microscopy indicates that paracingulin is not only localized in the TJ but also in the adherens junctions (AJ) depending on tissue type. TJ and AJ together form the apical junctional complex (AJC) of vertebrate epithelial cells. The proteins present in this complex play a role in many cellular processes i.e., in the adhesion and barrier function of epithelia, the organization and dynamics of the cytoskeleton, as well as the regulation of Rho-GTPase family.

== Discovery ==
CGNL1 was originally discovered in 1997 as a 155 kDa protein localized at epithelial and endothelial cell-cell junctions by using a new monoclonal antibody produced through immunization with a cell-cell junction enriched in plasma membrane fraction from chick liver. Subsequently, cloning and sequencing of the CGNL1 gene identified the similarity to cingulin.

== Localization ==
Paracingulin has been localized in epithelial and in endothelial tissues by immunofluorescence and immunoelectron microscopy. It localizes at junctions of epithelial cells, both at tight junctions and adherens junctions depending on cell tissue:

- In kidney tissue, paracingulin is localized both at TJs and AJs.
- In liver tissue, immunofluorescence experiments show junctional and apical localizations, whereas immunoelectron microscopy shows an exclusive TJ localization.
- In intestinal tissue, paracingulin is associated with non junctional actin filaments in the basal region of the cells.
- In cultured fibroblasts, a non junctional localization of paracingulin along actin stress fibers has also been observed in fibroblasts when exogenous paracingulin is expressed.

Paracingulin can also be found in non-junctional sites in some tissues for example in the cytoplasm and at the base of the cells. Finally, in isolated cells, paracingulin is localized at the cell periphery, unlike cingulin and ZO-1 and was detected in the leading edges of migrating cells.

== Structure and interactions ==
Human paracingulin is composed of 1302 amino acids with a predicted molecular weight of 148 kDa. Sequence similarity searches show that paracingulin is most similar to cingulin and comprises three major structural domains: A globular head (residues 1-598), a central coiled-coil rod domain (residues 599-1262) and a small globular tail domain at its C-terminus (residues 1263-1302). It is also predicted that this protein form a dimer through its coiled-coil rod domain. Both head and rod-tail domains associate with epithelial tight junctions when transfected into epithelial cells. Additionally, the head domain interacts with actin filaments independently of the Rod domain although the association is stabilized when the head is part of the full-length molecule. As its homologue cingulin, the head domain of paracingulin has a ZO-1 Interacting Motif (ZIM) that is involved in its junctional recruitment to tight junctions through ZO-1. Also, the head domain interacts with PLEKHA7, a protein present in the zonula adhaerens of epithelial cells, and this interaction is important for CGNL1 recruitment to adherens junctions. In addition the paracingulin interacts with the Rho GEF GEF-H1, the Rac1 GEF Tiam1 Tiam1, and it forms a complex with CD2AP and SH3BP1. Association of paracingulin with the apical junctional complex is a highly dynamic process, and requires the integrity of both microtubule and actin cytoskeleton.

Paracingulin interacts with cingulin and PLEKHA7 (as revealed by a yeast two-hybrid screen) as well as ZO-1, this latter through the ZIM region. JACOP is recruited to the TJ through interaction with ZO-1 (TJ-associated plaque protein, belonging to the membrane-associated guanylate kinase family) but is recruited to the AJ via interaction of it N-terminus head with PLEKHA7.

Unlike cingulin, paracingulin associates with actin filaments in different types of culture cells and its localization at the apical junctional complex is perturbed by treatment with the microtubule drug nocodazole. Paracingulin regulates the activity of Rho family GTPases like RhoA, Rac1 and Cdc42 by interacting with their respective GEFs (guanine nucleotide exchange factor), GEF-H1, Tiam1 and GAPs to the epithelial junction during the formation of cell-cell junction. The regulation of these GTPases is crucial for cell growth, activation of kinases and cytoskeletal organization.

== Function ==
The function of paracingulin has been mainly studied using knockdown approaches. Paracingulin locally regulates the activity of some members of the Rho GTPases family at the apical junctional region, thus participating in junction assembly and maintenance. Depletion of paracingulin by shRNA in cultured kidney cells (MDCK) does not alter tight or adherens junctions organization. However, it leads to increased levels of the mRNA encoding the tight junction proteins ZO-3 and claudin-2, as well as increased levels of the ZO-3 protein, whereas when combined with the depletion of cingulin, it causes a decrease in the expression of these proteins.

Paracingulin plays also a role in the initial phase of junction assembly. Indeed, its depletion in the experimental model of "calcium switch", which allows the study of Calcium-dependent junction formation, causes delayed tight junction assembly, correlating with a decrease in the Rac1 GTPase activity. The rod domain of the protein is critically involved in this Rac1-dependent regulation of junction assembly, as its overexpression mimicks the effect of paracingulin depletion; by the way, this also suggests that the head domain somehow prevents its action within the full-length protein. The phenotype can be rescued by an increase in Rac1 activity driven by overexpression of the GEF Tiam1, but not by increased RhoA activity. Indeed, paracingulin can interact with and thus recruit Tiam1 to the junction, allowing the local activation of Rac1 Both paracingulin depletion and overexpression experiments also led to the conclusion that it also interacts with and recruits SH3BP1, which is an inactivator of the Rho GTPases Cdc42 and Rac1 involved in epithelial junction formation in association with the filamentous actin-capping protein CapZ, by controlling actin-driven membrane remodeling. Paracingulin thus really acts as an adaptator for Rho GTPase regulators at the apical junctional region, and possibly at other cellular sites, because of its extra-junctional localization. In addition, cingulin and paracingulin have similar dynamics, partially overlapping subcellular localizations, and distinct interactions with the actin and microtubule cytoskeletons.

== Homolog ==
The CGNL1 gene is conserved in chimpanzee, rhesus monkey, dog, cow, mouse, rat, chicken, and zebrafish. Cingulin-like 1 and cingulin are homologous proteins with a good degree of similarity in sequence and domain organization.

The mouse homolog of CGNL1 has been designated JACOP (junction-associated coiled-coil protein). JACOP is recruited to the junctional complex in epithelial cells and to cell-cell contacts in fibroblasts. It has been suggested that JACOP is involved in anchoring cell-cell contacts to actin-based cytoskeletons within cells.

== Diseases ==
Paracingulin has been so far implicated in two diseases:

1. The aromatase excess syndrome: Heterozygous chromosomal inversion brings a cryptic aromatase promoter containing a portion of the CGNL1 promoter into a position immediately to the 5-prime of the coding region of cytochrome P450, family 19, subfamily A, polypeptide 1 (CYP19A1) gene.
2. Schizophrenia: The CGNL1 locus is one of the three loci which have been reported to be implicated in increased susceptibility to schizophrenia through the duplications at 1p36.33.
