= Cell junction =

Multiprotein complex that forms a point of contact or adhesion in animal cells

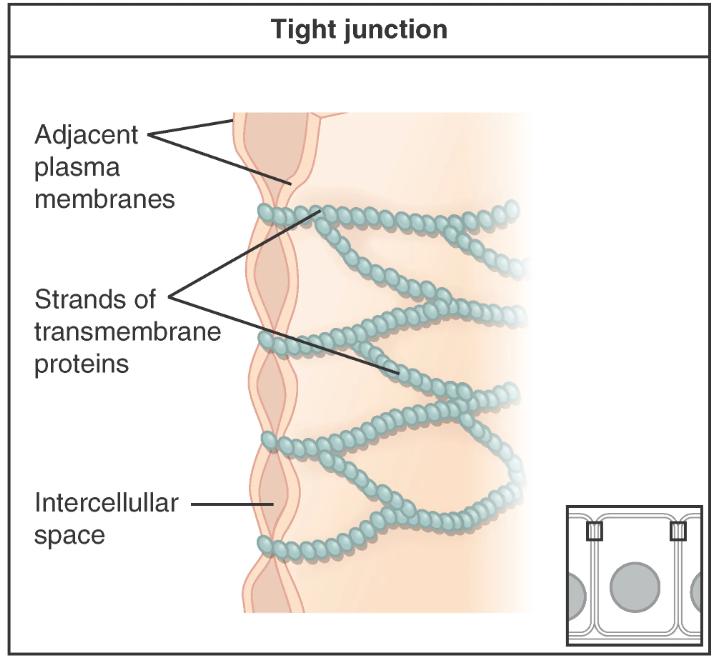
- Tight junction between two cells

Details

Identifiers
- Latin: junctiones cellulares
- TH: H1.00.01.0.00012
- FMA: 67394

Cell junctions or junctional complexes are a class of cellular structures consisting of multiprotein complexes that provide contact or adhesion between neighboring cells or between a cell and the extracellular matrix in animals. They also maintain the paracellular barrier of epithelia and control paracellular transport. Cell junctions are especially abundant in epithelial tissues. Combined with cell adhesion molecules and extracellular matrix, cell junctions help hold animal cells together.

Cell junctions are also especially important in enabling communication between neighboring cells via specialized protein complexes called communicating (gap) junctions. Cell junctions are also important in reducing stress placed upon cells.

In plants, similar communication channels are known as plasmodesmata, and in fungi they are called septal pores.

== Types ==
Some examples of cell junctions

In vertebrates, there are three major types of cell junction:

- Adherens junctions, desmosomes and hemidesmosomes (anchoring junctions)
- Gap junctions (communicating junction)
- Tight junctions (occluding junctions)

Invertebrates have several other types of specific junctions, for example septate junctions (a type of occluding junction) or the C. elegans apical junction. In multicellular plants, the structural functions of cell junctions are instead provided for by cell walls. The analogues of communicative cell junctions in plants are called plasmodesmata.

=== Anchoring junctions ===
Cells within tissues and organs must be anchored to one another and attached to components of the extracellular matrix. Cells have developed several types of junctional complexes to serve these functions, and in each case, anchoring proteins extend through the plasma membrane to link cytoskeletal proteins in one cell to cytoskeletal proteins in neighboring cells as well as to proteins in the extracellular matrix.

Three types of anchoring junctions are observed, and differ from one another in the cytoskeletal protein anchor as well as the transmembrane linker protein that extends through the membrane:

Junction	Cytoskeletal anchor	Transmembrane linker	Ties cell to:
Desmosomes	Intermediate filaments	Cadherin	Other cells
Hemidesmosomes	Intermediate filaments	Integrins	EC matrix
Adherens junctions (Adhesion belt, Focal adhesion)	Actin filaments	Cadherin / Integrin / Nectins	Other cells / EC matrix

Anchoring-type junctions not only hold cells together but provide tissues with structural cohesion. These junctions are most abundant in tissues that are subject to constant mechanical stress such as skin and heart.

==== Desmosomes ====
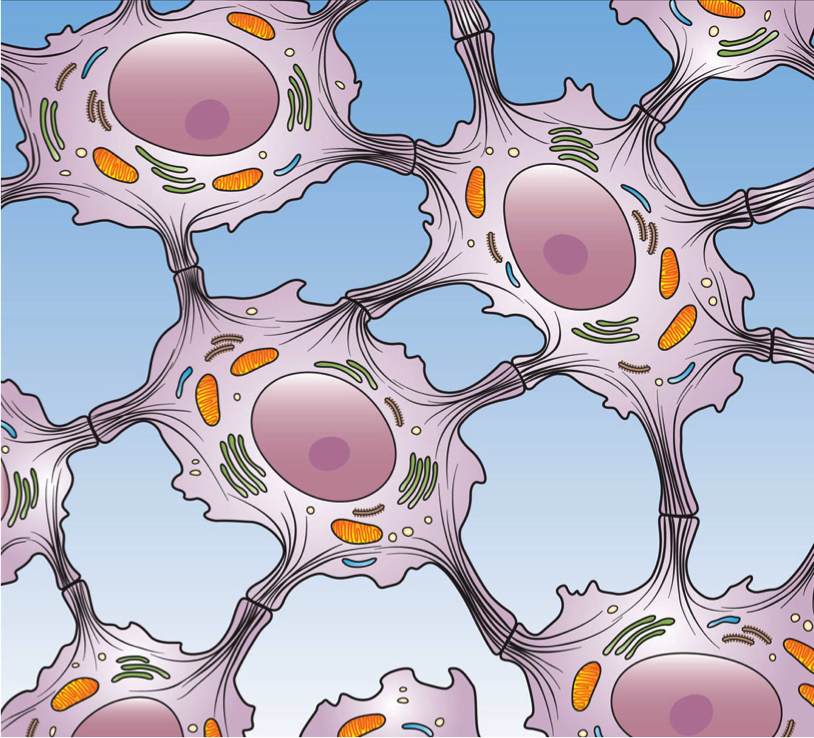
This image shows a desmosome junction between cells of the epidermal layer of the skin.

Desmosomes, also termed as maculae adherentes, can be visualized as rivets through the plasma membrane of adjacent cells. Intermediate filaments composed of keratin or desmin are attached to membrane-associated attachment proteins that form a dense plaque on the cytoplasmic face of the membrane. Cadherin molecules form the actual anchor by attaching to the cytoplasmic plaque, extending through the membrane and binding strongly to cadherins coming through the membrane of the adjacent cell.

==== Hemidesmosomes ====
Hemidesmosomes form rivet-like links between cytoskeleton and extracellular matrix components such as the basal laminae that underlie epithelia. Like desmosomes, they tie to intermediate filaments in the cytoplasm, but in contrast to desmosomes, their transmembrane anchors are integrins rather than cadherins.

==== Adherens junctions ====
Adherens junctions share the characteristic of anchoring cells through their cytoplasmic actin filaments. Similarly to desmosomes and hemidesmosomes, their transmembrane anchors are composed of cadherins in those that anchor to other cells and integrins (focal adhesion) in those that anchor to extracellular matrix. There is considerable morphological diversity among adherens junctions. Those that tie cells to one another are seen as isolated streaks or spots, or as bands that completely encircle the cell (adhesion belts). The band-type of adherens junctions is associated with bundles of actin filaments that also encircle the cell just below the plasma membrane. Spot-like adherens junctions called focal adhesions help cells adhere to extracellular matrix. The cytoskeletal actin filaments that tie into adherens junctions are contractile proteins and in addition to providing an anchoring function, adherens junctions are thought to participate in folding and bending of epithelial cell sheets. Thinking of the bands of actin filaments as being similar to 'drawstrings' shows how contraction of the bands within a group of cells would distort the sheet into interesting patterns.

=== Gap junctions ===
Gap junctions or communicating junctions, allow for direct chemical communication between adjacent cellular cytoplasm through diffusion without contact with the extracellular fluid. This is possible due to six connexin proteins interacting to form a cylinder with a pore in the centre called a connexon. The connexon complexes stretches across the cell membrane and when two adjacent cell connexons interact, they form a complete gap junction channel. Connexon pores vary in size, polarity and therefore can be specific depending on the connexin proteins that constitute each individual connexon. Whilst variation in gap junction channels do occur, their structure remains relatively standard, and this interaction ensures efficient communication without the escape of molecules or ions to the extracellular fluid.

Gap junctions play vital roles in the human body, including their role in the uniform contractile of the heart muscle. They are also relevant in signal transfers in the brain, and their absence shows a decreased cell density in the brain. Retinal and skin cells are also dependent on gap junctions in cell differentiation and proliferation.

=== Tight junctions ===
Found in vertebrate epithelia, tight junctions act as barriers that regulate the movement of water and solutes between epithelial layers. Tight junctions are classified as a paracellular barrier which is defined as not having directional discrimination; however, movement of the solute is largely dependent upon size and charge. There is evidence to suggest that the structures in which solutes pass through are somewhat like pores.

Physiological pH plays a part in the selectivity of solutes passing through tight junctions with most tight junctions being slightly selective for cations. Tight junctions present in different types of epithelia are selective for solutes of differing size, charge, and polarity.

==== Proteins ====
There have been approximately 40 proteins identified to be involved in tight junctions. These proteins can be classified into four major categories;signalling proteins.

===== Roles =====
- Scaffolding proteins – organise the transmembrane proteins, couple transmembrane proteins to other cytoplasmic proteins as well as to actin filaments.
- Signaling proteins – involved in junctions assembly, barrier regulation, and gene transcription.
- Regulation proteins – regulate membrane vesicle targeting.
- Transmembrane proteins – including junctional adhesion molecule, occludin, and claudin.

It is believed that claudin is the protein molecule responsible for the selective permeability between epithelial layers.

A three-dimensional image is still yet to be achieved and as such specific information about the function of tight junctions is yet to be determined.

=== Tricellular junctions ===
Tricellular junctions seal epithelia at the corners of three cells. Due to the geometry of three-cell vertices, the sealing of the cells at these sites requires a specific junctional organization, different from those in bicellular junctions. In vertebrates, components tricellular junctions are tricellulin and lipolysis-stimulated lipoprotein receptors. In invertebrates, the components are gliotactin and anakonda.

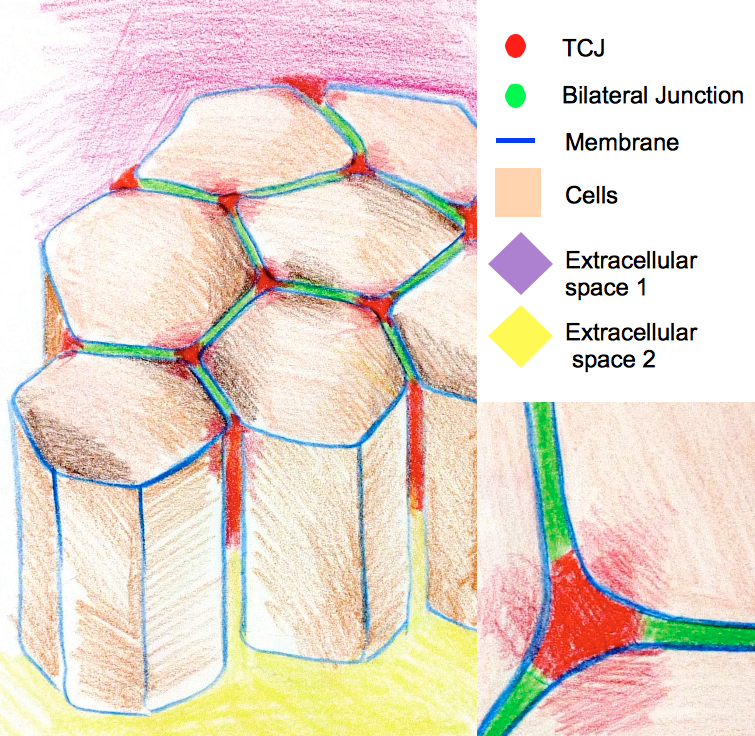
The cartoon of epithelium cells connected by tricellular junctions at the regions where three cells meet.

Tricellular junctions are also implicated in the regulation of cytoskeletal organization and cell divisions. In particular they ensure that cells divide according to the Hertwig rule. In some Drosophila epithelia, during cell divisions tricellular junctions establish physical contact with spindle apparatus through astral microtubules. Tricellular junctions exert a pulling force on the spindle apparatus and serve as a geometrical clue to determine orientation of cell divisions.

== Cell junction molecules ==
The molecules responsible for creating cell junctions include various cell adhesion molecules. There are four main types: selectins, cadherins, integrins, and the immunoglobulin superfamily.

Selectins are cell adhesion molecules that play an important role in the initiation of inflammatory processes. The functional capacity of selectin is limited to leukocyte collaborations with vascular endothelium. There are three types of selectins found in humans; L-selectin, P-selectin and E-selectin. L-selectin deals with lymphocytes, monocytes and neutrophils, P-selectin deals with platelets and endothelium and E-selectin deals only with endothelium. They have extracellular regions made up of an amino-terminal lectin domain, attached to a carbohydrate ligand, growth factor-like domain, and short repeat units (numbered circles) that match the complementary binding protein domains.

Cadherins are calcium-dependent adhesion molecules. Cadherins are extremely important in the process of morphogenesis – fetal development. Together with an alpha-beta catenin complex, the cadherin can bind to the microfilaments of the cytoskeleton of the cell. This allows for homophilic cell–cell adhesion. The β-catenin–α-catenin linked complex at the adherens junctions allows for the formation of a dynamic link to the actin cytoskeleton.

Integrins act as adhesion receptors, transporting signals across the plasma membrane in multiple directions. These molecules are an invaluable part of cellular communication, as a single ligand can be used for many integrins. Unfortunately, these molecules still have a long way to go in the ways of research.

Immunoglobulin superfamily are a group of calcium independent proteins capable of homophilic and heterophilic adhesion. Homophilic adhesion involves the immunoglobulin-like domains on the cell surface binding to the immunoglobulin-like domains on an opposing cell's surface while heterophilic adhesion refers to the binding of the immunoglobulin-like domains to integrins and carbohydrates instead.

Cell adhesion is a vital component of the body. Loss of this adhesion effects cell structure, cellular functioning and communication with other cells and the extracellular matrix and can lead to severe health issues and diseases.
