= USP53 =

Protein-coding gene in the species Homo sapiens

Identifiers
- Aliases: USP53, ubiquitin specific peptidase 53
- External IDs: OMIM: 617431; MGI: 2139607; GeneCards: USP53
Enzyme activity
EC #	BRENDA	ExPASy	KEGG	MetaCyc
3.4.19.12	↗	↗	↗	↗

Gene location (Human)
Chr.	Chromosome 4 (human)
Band	4q26	Start	119,212,587 bp
Band	4q26	End	119,295,517 bp

Gene location (Mouse)
Chr.	Chromosome 3 (mouse)
Band	3|3 G1	Start	122,725,142 bp
Band	3|3 G1	End	122,778,159 bp
RNA expression pattern
Bgee	Human / Mouse (ortholog); Top expressed in: Achilles tendon; tibial nerve; gastric mucosa; right lung; germinal epithelium; sural nerve; lower lobe of lung; epithelium of colon; trigeminal ganglion; tibia / Top expressed in: gastrula; decidua; lumbar subsegment of spinal cord; epithelium of stomach; conjunctival fornix; left colon; median eminence; intercostal muscle; spermatid; spermatocyte; More reference expression data
BioGPS	n/a
Gene ontology
Molecular function	protein binding; thiol-dependent deubiquitinase
Cellular component	cell-cell junction; bicellular tight junction; cell junction; cellular component
Biological process	protein deubiquitination; hearing; action potential; apoptotic process; response to auditory stimulus; neuron apoptotic process; biological process
Sources:Amigo / QuickGO
Orthologs
Databases	NCBI: entry; OMA: entry
Species	Human	Mouse
Entrez	54532	99526
Ensembl	ENSG00000145390	ENSMUSG00000039701
UniProt	Q70EK8	P15975
RefSeq (mRNA)	NM_019050; NM_001371395; NM_001371396; NM_001371397; NM_001371398 NM_001371399	NM_133857
RefSeq (protein)	NP_061923; NP_001358324; NP_001358325; NP_001358326; NP_001358327 NP_001358328	NP_598618
Location (UCSC)	Chr 4: 119.21 – 119.3 Mb	Chr 3: 122.73 – 122.78 Mb
PubMed search
- Wikidata
View/Edit Human	View/Edit Mouse

Inactive ubiquitin carboxyl-terminal hydrolase 53 is a protein that in humans is encoded by the USP53 gene.

Although USP53 is classified as a deubiquitinating enzyme based on sequence homology to other proteases from this group, it lacks a functionally essential histidine in the catalytic domaine and activity assays suggest that USP53 is catalytically inactive. Even though USP53 is devoid of catalytic activity, USP53 serves important physiological functions: mutations in Usp53 have been shown to cause progressive hearing loss in mice, as well as late-onset hearing loss and cholestasis in humans. USP53 localizes at cellular tight junctions and interacts with tight junction protein 2 (TJP2). Mutations in TJP2 have also been shown to cause hearing impairments and cholestasis.
