= CGN =

CGN may refer to:

== Science and medicine ==
- Childhood gender nonconformity
- Cingulin, encoded by the CGN gene
- Cis Golgi network
- Crescentic glomerulonephritis

== Transport ==
- Cogan railway station, Wales
- Cologne Bonn Airport, Germany
- Compagnie Générale de Navigation sur le lac Léman, a Swiss transport company

== Other uses ==
- Carrier-grade NAT, a networking technology
- Ceredigion, a historic county in Wales
- China General Nuclear Power Group, a Chinese energy company
- Guided missile cruiser
