= Cingulin =

Protein found in humans

CGN

Identifiers
- Aliases: CGN, cingulin
- External IDs: OMIM: 609473; MGI: 1927237; HomoloGene: 41394; GeneCards: CGN; OMA:CGN - orthologs

Gene location (Human)
Chr.	Chromosome 1 (human)
Band	1q21.3	Start	151,510,510 bp
Band	1q21.3	End	151,538,692 bp

Gene location (Mouse)
Chr.	Chromosome 3 (mouse)
Band	3 F2.1|3 40.74 cM	Start	94,667,376 bp
Band	3 F2.1|3 40.74 cM	End	94,693,826 bp
RNA expression pattern
Bgee	Human / Mouse (ortholog); Top expressed in: pancreatic ductal cell; mucosa of ileum; mucosa of transverse colon; right uterine tube; body of pancreas; rectum; right lobe of liver; duodenum; upper lobe of left lung; right lung / Top expressed in: otolith organ; utricle; yolk sac; jejunum; ciliary body; zygote; vestibular membrane of cochlear duct; ileum; secondary oocyte; transitional epithelium of urinary bladder; More reference expression data
BioGPS	n/a
Gene ontology
Molecular function	actin binding; cytoskeletal motor activity; protein binding; cadherin binding
Cellular component	myosin complex; bicellular tight junction; plasma membrane; cell junction
Biological process	transforming growth factor beta receptor signaling pathway; biological process
Sources:Amigo / QuickGO
Orthologs
Species	Human	Mouse
Entrez	57530	70737
Ensembl	ENSG00000143375	ENSMUSG00000068876
UniProt	Q9P2M7	P59242
RefSeq (mRNA)	NM_020770	NM_001037711; NM_001293727
RefSeq (protein)	NP_065821	n/a
Location (UCSC)	Chr 1: 151.51 – 151.54 Mb	Chr 3: 94.67 – 94.69 Mb
PubMed search
- Wikidata
View/Edit Human	View/Edit Mouse

Cingulin (CGN; from the Latin cingere "to form a belt around") is a cytosolic protein encoded by the CGN gene in humans localized at tight junctions (TJs) of vertebrate epithelial and endothelial cells.

== Discovery ==
Cingulin was originally discovered at the MRC Laboratory of Molecular Biology (Cambridge, UK) by Dr. Sandra Citi, as a protein present in chicken intestinal epithelial cells, that co-purified with non-muscle myosin II and was specifically localized at tight junctions (zonulae occludentes).

== Structure & interactions ==
Cingulin is a homodimer, each subunit containing a N-terminal globular "head" domain, a long α-helical coiled-coil "rod" domain and a small globular C-terminal "tail" region. This organization is highly conserved throughout vertebrates. However, cingulin homologs have not been detected in invertebrates.

In vitro, cingulin can bind to and bundle actin filaments, and interact with myosin II and several TJ proteins including ZO-1, ZO-2, ZO-3, paracingulin and occludin. Moreover, cingulin forms a complex with JAM-A, a tight junction membrane protein. Most of cingulin protein interactions are through the globular head domain. Cingulin interacts with ZO-1 through an N-terminal ZO-1 interacting motif (ZIM) in its head region. The rod domain is involved in dimerization and interaction with the RhoA activator, GEF-H1.

Cingulin has also been found to interact with microtubules (MTs) through the N-terminal head region, and these interactions was regulated by phosphorylation by the adenosine monophosphate-activated protein kinase (AMPK).

== Function ==
The function of cingulin has been studied by knockout (KO), knockdown (KD) and over-expression approaches. Embryoid bodies derived from embryonic stem cells where one or both cingulin alleles were targeted by homologous recombination show apparently normal tight junctions, but changes in the expression of a large number of genes, including tight junction protein genes (claudin-2, claudin-6, claudin-7 and occludin) and transcription factors (including GATA4). Changes in the expression of claudin-2 and ZO-3 are also observed in cultured kidney cells (MDCK) depleted of cingulin by shRNA.

In 2012, the phenotype of cingulin-knockout mice was described, proving that functional TJ in vivo can be formed in the absence of cingulin. Together with paracingulin, cingulin also was reported to regulate claudin-2 expression through RhoA-dependent and independent mechanisms. The role of cingulin in development has been studied by morpholino. oligonucleotide-mediated depletion in chicken, indicating that cingulin is involved in neural crest development. In early mouse and frog embryos, maternal cingulin is localized in the cell cortex. Through early mouse development, cytocortical cingulin in present from oogenesis (cumulus-oocyte contact sites) until 16-cells morulae stage (apical microvillous zones) during early embryogenesis; then maternal cingulin is degraded by endocytic turn-over from the 32-cells stage. Regarding the zygotic cingulin, it accumulates at the tight junctions from 16-cells stage, 10 hours after ZO-1 assembly. Furthermore, the synthesis of cingulin in early mouse embryos is tissue-specific and it occurs in blastocyst (up-regulated in trophectoderm and down-regulated in inner-cells). In Xenopus laevis embryos, maternal cingulin is recruited to apical cell-cell junctions from 2-cells stage.

== Homologs ==
In 2004, a protein homologous to cingulin was discovered and named JACOP (also known as paracingulin, or cingulin-like 1 protein; CGNL1).

== Human diseases ==
Although cingulin has been involved in regulation of RhoA signaling and gene expression in cultured cells and KO mice, nothing is known about the specific role of cingulin in human diseases. Cingulin expression has been studied in human carcinomas and shown to be expressed in adenocarcinomas and down-regulated in squamous carcinomas. Furthermore, histone deacetylase inhibitors, such as sodium butyrate, strongly upregulate its expression in some cultured cells. Cingulin, as other junctional proteins could be used as a marker of epithelial differentiation, and as a diagnostic marker to distinguish adenocarcinomas from squamous carcinomas.
