= EASI =

EASI may refer to:

- Employment Agency Standards Inspectorate
- Extra-amniotic saline infusion
- Eczema area and severity index, an index to measure the severity of atopic dermatitis
- EASI, an Asian online food ordering and delivery platform
- Emotions as Social Information (EASI) Model, psychological model
