= Psoriasis Area and Severity Index =

Tool for measuring the severity of psoriasis

PASI
- Purpose: measurement of severity of psoriasis

Psoriasis Area and Severity Index (PASI) is the most widely used tool for the measurement of severity of psoriasis. PASI combines the assessment of the severity of lesions and the area affected into a single score in the range 0 (no disease) to 72 (maximal disease).

== Calculation ==
The body is divided into four sections (head (H) (10% of a person's skin); arms (A) (20%); trunk (T) (30%); legs (L) (40%)). Each of these areas is scored by itself, and then the four scores are combined into the final PASI. For each section, the percent of area of skin involved, is estimated and then transformed into a grade from 0 to 6:

1. 0% of involved area
2. < 10% of involved area
3. 10–29% of involved area
4. 30–49% of involved area
5. 50–69% of involved area
6. 70–89% of involved area
7. 90–100% of involved area

Within each area, the severity is estimated by three clinical signs: erythema (redness), induration (thickness) and desquamation (scaling). Severity parameters are measured on a scale of 0 to 4, from none to maximum.

The sum of all three severity parameters is then calculated for each section of skin, multiplied by the area score for that area and multiplied by weight of respective section (0.1 for head, 0.2 for arms, 0.3 for body and 0.4 for legs).

=== Response rate ===
PASI is widely used in clinical trials of therapies to treat psoriasis. Although absolute PASI score is often used to define entry into a trial, it is response to treatment that is important to measure efficacy and outcomes. This is usually presented as a percentage response rate; e.g., PASI 50, PASI 75, PASI 90, PASI 100.

PASI 75, for example, represents the percentage (or number) of patients who have achieved a 75% or more reduction in their PASI score from baseline. PASI 100 indicates patients who have achieved a complete resolution of all disease. By definition a patient who has achieved PASI 75 has also achieved PASI 50. There is a gradual tendency, as therapies become more effective to report higher efficacy rates in clinical trials - but aiming high may not be without risk of over-treating some patients.

== Modifications ==
=== Objectivisation ===
Psoriatic area assessment and severity assessments were found to be non-reproducible. Several automated procedure for more reproducible measurement of psoriatic area were developed, but were not suitable for large-scale trials. A method where the advantage of accurate computerized measurement of the area on the digital photograph was combined with physician's proficiency in determination of the edge of psoriatic lesion was published. The patients were examined and photographed before and after the therapy with calcipotriol ointment or placebo. The psoriatic area was manually outlined on the patient's photographs by physician and the area was automatically measured by a computer. For comparison, the physicians also made standard psoriatic area assessment. Computer-aided measurement of psoriatic lesion area was found to improve the power of the clinical trial, compared to the standard approach. The physician's estimations of the psoriatic lesion area tend to overestimate. The adapted PASI index, where the psoriatic area was not converted into an area grade, but was maintained as a continuous variable, also improved the power of the clinical trial. The modified PASI which involves computer-aided area measurement as a continuous variable is named Computer aided psoriasis continuous area and severity score cPcASI.

=== Simplification ===
PASI can be too unwieldy to use outside of trials, which has led to attempts to simplify the index (SPASI) for clinical use.

=== Alternate approaches ===
While higher PASI scores indicate more severe psoriasis, it is difficult for patients or doctors to describe the clinical severity for any specific PASI number. Attempts have been made to address this problem by providing descriptions of psoriasis severity in evaluation systems, including the Psoriasis Global Assessment (PGA) and the Lattice-System Physician's Global Assessment (LS-PGA); a study compared and validated PASI, PGA, and LS-PGA.

== See also ==
- Eczema Area and Severity Index
