= Coxsackievirus and adenovirus receptor =

Protein found in humans

CXADR
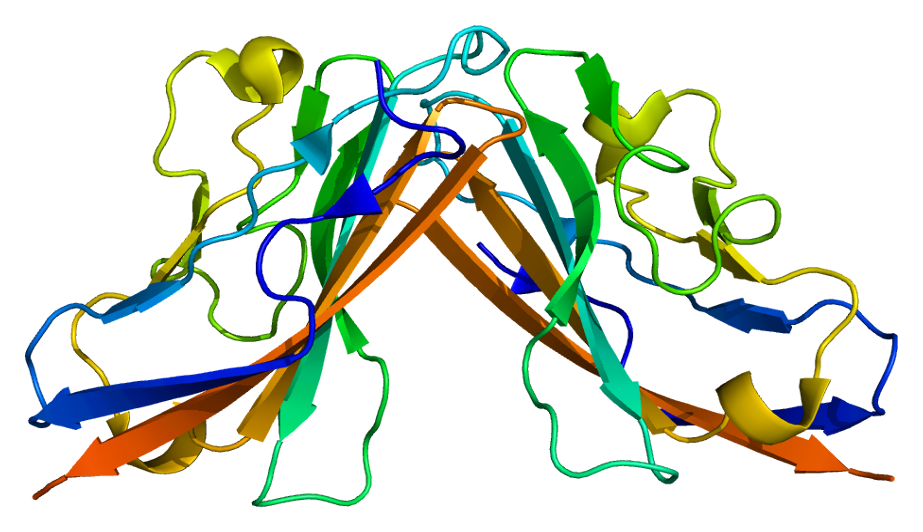

Identifiers
- Aliases: CXADR, CAR, CAR4/6, HCAR, coxsackie virus and adenovirus receptor, Ig-like cell adhesion molecule, CXADR Ig-like cell adhesion molecule
- External IDs: OMIM: 602621; MGI: 1201679; GeneCards: CXADR
Available structures
PDB	Ortholog search: PDBe RCSB
PDB	List of PDB id codes 1EAJ, 1F5W, 1JEW, 1KAC, 1P69, 1P6A, 1RSF, 2J12, 2J1K, 2NPL, 2W9L, 2WBW, 3J6L, 3J6M, 3J6N, 3J6O

Gene location (Human)
Chr.	Chromosome 21 (human)
Band	21q21.1	Start	17,513,043 bp
Band	21q21.1	End	17,593,579 bp

Gene location (Mouse)
Chr.	Chromosome 16 (mouse)
Band	16|16 C3.1	Start	78,098,377 bp
Band	16|16 C3.1	End	78,156,662 bp
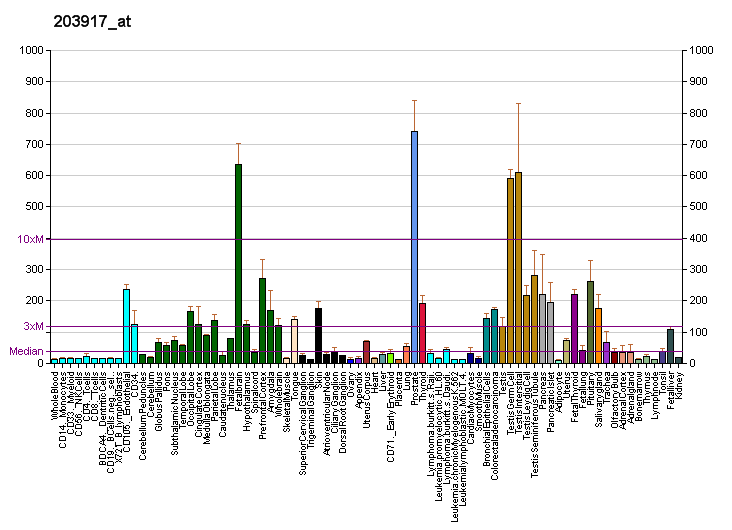
RNA expression pattern
Bgee	Human / Mouse (ortholog); Top expressed in: nipple; palpebral conjunctiva; skin of arm; skin of thigh; vulva; pylorus; skin of hip; jejunal mucosa; human penis; gums / Top expressed in: vestibular sensory epithelium; ganglionic eminence; epithelium of stomach; left colon; medial ganglionic eminence; vestibular membrane of cochlear duct; parotid gland; left lung lobe; atrioventricular valve; skin of external ear; More reference expression data
BioGPS	More reference expression data
Gene ontology
Molecular function	PDZ domain binding; beta-catenin binding; connexin binding; virus receptor activity; integrin binding; protein binding; identical protein binding; signaling receptor binding; cell adhesion molecule binding; cell adhesive protein binding involved in AV node cell-bundle of His cell communication
Cellular component	cytoplasm; integral component of membrane; cell body; membrane; intercalated disc; cell-cell junction; bicellular tight junction; filopodium; growth cone; adherens junction; neuromuscular junction; plasma membrane; integral component of plasma membrane; nucleoplasm; extracellular region; cell junction; apicolateral plasma membrane; basolateral plasma membrane; acrosomal vesicle; membrane raft; neuron projection; extracellular space; protein-containing complex
Biological process	actin cytoskeleton reorganization; heterophilic cell-cell adhesion via plasma membrane cell adhesion molecules; cell-cell junction organization; epithelial structure maintenance; AV node cell to bundle of His cell communication; gamma-delta T cell activation; mitochondrion organization; neutrophil chemotaxis; transepithelial transport; homotypic cell-cell adhesion; development of the heart; cell adhesion; defense response to virus; regulation of immune response; viral entry into host cell; viral process; leukocyte migration; germ cell migration; AV node cell-bundle of His cell adhesion involved in cell communication; regulation of AV node cell action potential; negative regulation of cardiac muscle cell proliferation; cell-cell adhesion
Sources:Amigo / QuickGO
Orthologs
Databases	NCBI: entry; OMA: entry
Species	Human	Mouse
Entrez	1525	13052
Ensembl	ENSG00000154639	ENSMUSG00000022865
UniProt	P78310	P97792
RefSeq (mRNA)	NM_001207063; NM_001207064; NM_001207065; NM_001207066; NM_001338	NM_001025192; NM_001276263; NM_009988
RefSeq (protein)	NP_001193992; NP_001193993; NP_001193994; NP_001193995; NP_001329	NP_001020363; NP_001263192; NP_034118
Location (UCSC)	Chr 21: 17.51 – 17.59 Mb	Chr 16: 78.1 – 78.16 Mb
PubMed search
- Wikidata
View/Edit Human	View/Edit Mouse

Coxsackievirus and adenovirus receptor (CAR) is a protein that in humans is encoded by the CXADR gene. The protein encoded by this gene is a type I membrane receptor for group B coxsackie viruses and subgroup C adenoviruses. CAR protein is expressed in several tissues, including heart, brain, and, more generally, epithelial and endothelial cells. In cardiac muscle, CAR is localized to intercalated disc structures, which electrically and mechanically couple adjacent cardiomyocytes. CAR plays an important role in the pathogenesis of myocarditis, dilated cardiomyopathy, and in arrhythmia susceptibility following myocardial infarction or myocardial ischemia. In addition, an isoform of CAR (CAR-SIV) has been recently identified in the cytoplasm of pancreatic beta cells. It's been suggested that CAR-SIV resides in the insulin secreting granules and might be involved in the virus infection of these cells.

== Structure ==
Human CAR protein has a theoretical molecular weight of 40.0 kDa and is composed of 365 amino acids. The human CAR gene (CXADR) is found on chromosome 21. Alternative splicing is known to produce at least 2 splice variants known as hCAR1 and hCAR2 and are each composed of at least 7 exons. Pseudogenes of this gene are found on chromosomes 15, 18, and 21.

CAR is a transmembrane bound protein with two Ig-like extracellular domains, a transmembrane domain, a cytoplasmic domain, and two N-linked glycosylation sites. CAR contains two disulfide bonded loops (residues 35–130 and 155–220). The N-terminal segment comprises the two extracellular domains (D1 and D2). D1 is most distal from the membrane and contains a V/Ig-like fold whereas D2 is more proximal. The cytoplasmic tail of CAR contains the amino acids G S I V, which is characterized as a class 1 PDZ-binding motif for interacting with proteins containing PDZ domains.

The protein is found to be expressed in various regions of the body including the heart, brain, and, more generally, epithelial and endothelial cells. Moreover, CAR expression is not found in normal or tumor cell lines. Expression of CAR in endothelial cells can be regulated by treatment with drugs.

== Function ==
It functions as a homophilic and heterophilic cell adhesion molecule through its interactions with extracellular matrix glycoproteins such as: fibronectin, agrin, laminin-1 and tenascin-R.

=== Cardiac ===
CAR is essential for normal development of cardiomyocytes. The expression of CAR is high in developing tissues, including the heart and brain; postnatally it is expressed in epithelial cells and in adult cardiac muscle, it is localized at intercalated discs. Knocking out CAR is embryonic lethal in mice by day 11.5, coordinate with severe cardiac muscle abnormalities including left ventricular hyperplasia, sinuatrial valve abnormalities, pericardial edema, thoracic hemorrhaging, myocardial wall degeneration, regional apoptosis, reduced density and disorganization of myofibrils, and enlarged mitochondria. Cardiomyocyte-specific deletion of CAR after embryonic day 11 had no noticeable effect on development and postnatal life, suggesting that CAR is critical during a temporal window of cardiac development.

It is clear from studies employing transgenesis that CAR function at intercalated discs in cardiac muscle is critical for normal heart function. Cardiac-specific knockout of CAR causes first degree block or complete block in the propagation of electrical conduction in the AV node. This was coordinate with the loss of connexin-45 at cell-cell junctions on the sarcolemmal membranes of AV node cells. Mice eventually developed cardiomyopathy associated with intercalated disc disorganization and loss of cardiomyocyte beta-catenin and ZO-1 expression; studies also showed that CAR, and connexin-45 form a protein complex that requires the PDZ-binding motif on CAR for proper formation. Moreover, CAR is required for normal localization of connexin-45, beta-catenin and ZO-1 at intercalated discs.

Studies from human hearts have shown that lower expression of CXADR mRNA is associated with a risk allele at chromosome 21q21, which may in fact predispose hearts to arrhythmias. To discern the mechanistic underpinnings, hearts from heterozygous CAR knockout mice subjected to acute myocardial ischemia were evaluated and showed slowed ventricular conduction, earlier onset of ventricular arrhythmias, and increased susceptibility to arrhythmias. These findings were coordinate with a reduction in magnitude of the sodium current at intercalated discs; CAR coprecipitated with NaV1.5, which may provide a mechanistic link to this finding.

=== Neural and lymphatic ===
CAR is strongly expressed in the developing central nervous system where it is thought to mediate neurite outgrowth. In addition, expression of CAR is readily detectable in the adult nervous system.

It has also been shown that CAR is critical for the development of lymphatic vasculature and in forming lymphatic endothelial cell-cell junctions.

== Clinical significance ==
CAR is a receptor for both Coxsackie B virus and adenovirus 2 and 5, which are structurally distinct.

In patients with myocarditis or dilated cardiomyopathy, elevated Coxsackie B2 viral nucleic acids have been detected in myocardial biopsy samples. Adenoviral genomic DNA has also been detected in myocardial biopsies of patients with idiopathic cardiomyopathy, or impaired left ventricular function of unknown origin. Patients exhibiting sudden death from acute myocardial infarction had a higher proportion of active coxsackie B virus infection relative to matched controls, which was coordinate with disrupted sarcolemmal localization of dystrophin, suggesting that enteroviral infection may worsen the outcome of patients with acute myocardial infarction.

A role for CAR in arrhythmia susceptibility and ventricular fibrillation after myocardial infarction was shown in that CXADR lies near the 21q21 locus, which is strongly associated with these insults.

== Interactions ==
CAR has been shown to interact with: MAGI-1b, PICK1, PSD-95, ZO-1, NaV1.5
