= Septate junction =

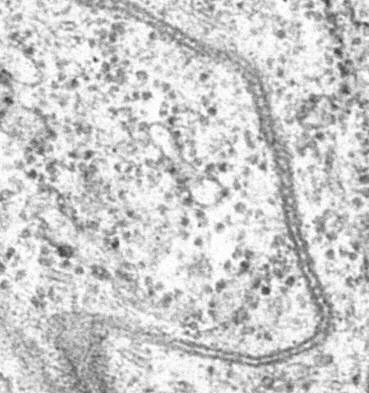
Sepate junction in developing trachea in Drosophila

Septate junctions are intercellular junctions found in invertebrate epithelial cells, appearing as ladder-like structures under electron microscopy. They are thought to provide structural strength and a barrier to solute diffusion through the intercellular space. They are considered somewhat analogous to the (vertebrate) tight junctions; however, tight and septate junctions are different in many ways. Known insect homologues of tight junction components are components of conserved signalling pathways that localize to either adherens junctions, the subapical complex, or the marginal zone. Recent studies show that septate junctions are also identified in the myelinated nerve fibers of the vertebrates.

== Structure ==
The main trait of septate junctions structure is that cross-bridges or septa are in the ladder-like shape and cover the 15–20 nm intermembrane space of cell–cell contacts. Septate junctions are in a tight arrangement which is parallel to each other.

For the septate junctions, several components are related to the function or the morphology of septate junctions, like Band 4.1-Coracle, Discs-large, fasciclin III, Neurexin IV (NRX) and so on. Band 4.1-Coracle is necessary for the interaction of the cell. Discs-large, a key component of septate junctions, is needed for the growth control. Fasciclin III acts as an adhesion protein. Neurexin IV (NRX) is a required transmembrane protein for the formation of septate junctions. For example, the glial–glial septate junctions that lack NRX will cause the blood barriers to break down. Gliotactin (Gli), is also a necessary a transmembrane protein for the formation of pleated septate junctions. Tsp2A and Undicht are newly identified components that are needed for the formation of smooth septate junctions and septate junctions.

There are three known claudins contained in the septate junctions, Megatrachea (Mega), Sinuous (Sinu) and Kune-kune (Kune). Among these three claudins, Kune-kune (Kune) plays a more central role in septate junctions organization and function.

== Function ==
There are several functions of septate junctions.

- Pleated SJs(pSJs) play roles in development and cell signaling.
- Form the mechanical link between cells which can densely pack the epithelial sheaths.
- Intermediate the adjacent cells interaction.
- Prevent the free diffusion of water and solutes among adjacent epithelial cells.
- Preserve the epithelial polarity and cell adhesion.
- Have a function in the morphogenesis like tracheal morphology that regulate the cell size and the cell length.
- Regulate cell proliferation.
- Characterize the properties of the paracellular pathway in insect Malpighian tubules (MTs).
- Some unusual septate junctions have the function in the Drosophila testis like keeping premature sperm staying inside.

For the septate junctions in the vertebrates, they play some roles of tight junctions.

Na+/K+ ATPase works for the function of septate junctions.

== Classification ==
In Drosophila melanogaster, there are two types of septate junctions, smooth SJs (sSJs) and pleated SJs(pSJs). sSJs and pSJs are distributed in different tissues. sSJs are in gut endoderm and Malpighian tubules, while pSJs are in the ectodermally derived epithelia. sSJs and pSJs vary in shape but have the same function.

== See also ==
- Tight junctions
- Adherens junctions
- Desmosomes
- Hemidesmosomes
- Gap junctions
