= Tyrosine-protein kinase Yes =

Protein found in humans

YES1
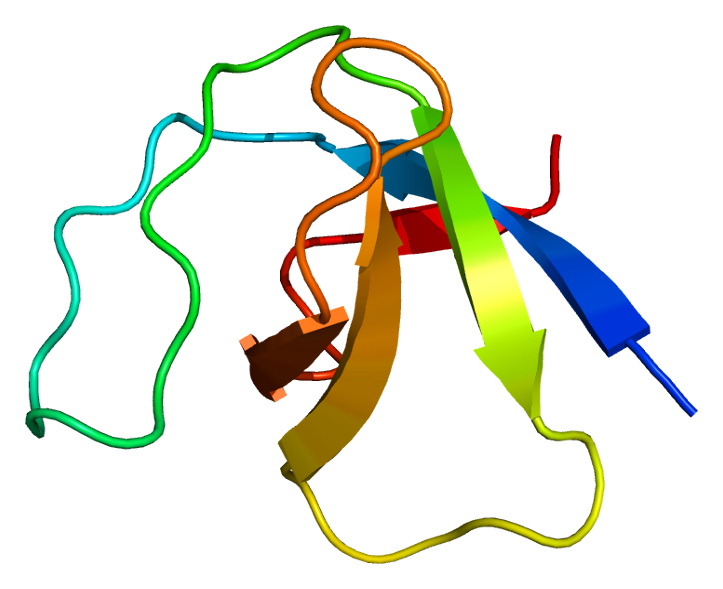

Identifiers
- Aliases: YES1, HsT441, P61-YES, Yes, c-yes, YES proto-oncogene 1, Src family tyrosine kinase
- External IDs: OMIM: 164880; MGI: 99147; GeneCards: YES1
Available structures
PDB	Ortholog search: PDBe RCSB
PDB	List of PDB id codes 2HDA
Enzyme activity
EC #	BRENDA	ExPASy	KEGG	MetaCyc
2.7.10.2	↗	↗	↗	↗

Gene location (Human)
Chr.	Chromosome 18 (human)
Band	18p11.32	Start	721,588 bp
Band	18p11.32	End	812,546 bp

Gene location (Mouse)
Chr.	Chromosome 5 (mouse)
Band	5 B1|5 17.33 cM	Start	32,768,515 bp
Band	5 B1|5 17.33 cM	End	32,844,401 bp
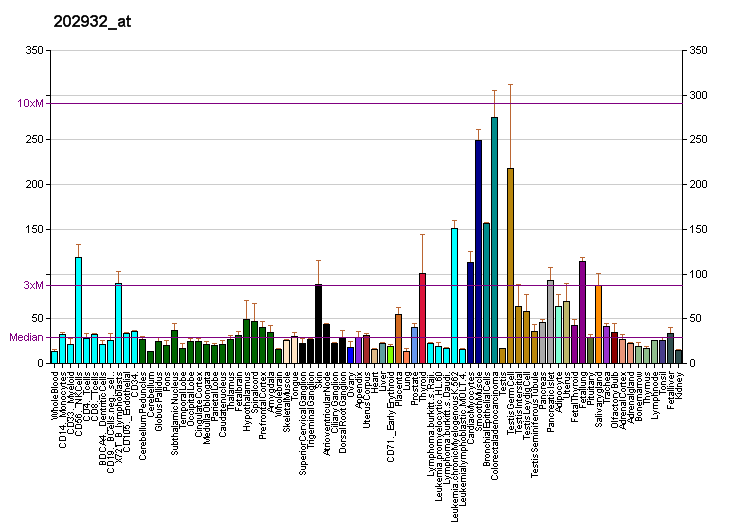

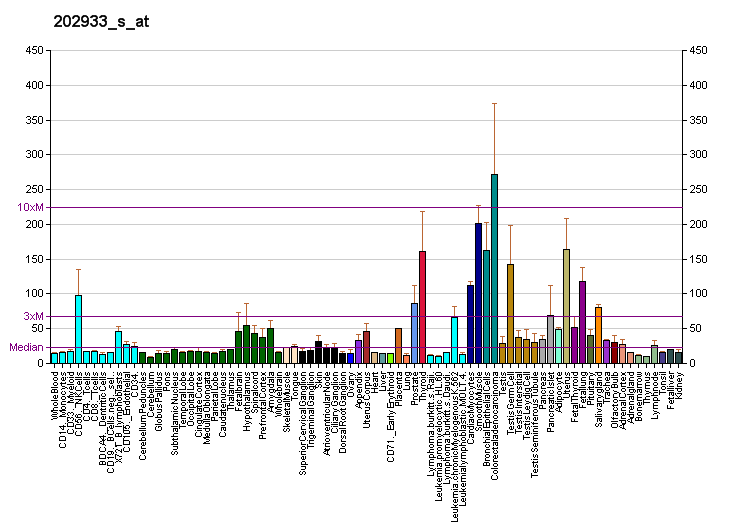
RNA expression pattern
Bgee	Human / Mouse (ortholog); Top expressed in: secondary oocyte; jejunal mucosa; parotid gland; buccal mucosa cell; visceral pleura; gingival epithelium; parietal pleura; endothelial cell; corpus epididymis; lactiferous duct / Top expressed in: lumbar spinal ganglion; cumulus cell; left lung lobe; tail of embryo; migratory enteric neural crest cell; seminal vesicula; Rostral migratory stream; genital tubercle; Gonadal ridge; zygote; More reference expression data
BioGPS	More reference expression data
Gene ontology
Molecular function	transferase activity; nucleotide binding; protein kinase activity; transmembrane transporter binding; epidermal growth factor receptor binding; non-membrane spanning protein tyrosine kinase activity; kinase activity; protein binding; enzyme binding; protein tyrosine kinase activity; signaling receptor binding; ATP binding; phosphotyrosine residue binding
Cellular component	Golgi apparatus; membrane; focal adhesion; extrinsic component of cytoplasmic side of plasma membrane; plasma membrane; microtubule organizing center; actin filament; extracellular exosome; cytoskeleton; cytoplasm; cytosol; glutamatergic synapse; postsynaptic specialization, intracellular component
Biological process	cellular response to transforming growth factor beta stimulus; cellular response to retinoic acid; cell differentiation; Fc-gamma receptor signaling pathway involved in phagocytosis; phosphorylation; transmembrane receptor protein tyrosine kinase signaling pathway; ephrin receptor signaling pathway; T cell costimulation; cellular response to platelet-derived growth factor stimulus; protein phosphorylation; regulation of vascular permeability; regulation of cell population proliferation; positive regulation of peptidyl-tyrosine phosphorylation; peptidyl-tyrosine autophosphorylation; protein autophosphorylation; leukocyte migration; positive regulation of transcription by RNA polymerase II; innate immune response; cell migration; regulation of glucose transmembrane transport
Sources:Amigo / QuickGO
Orthologs
Databases	NCBI: entry; OMA: entry
Species	Human	Mouse
Entrez	7525	22612
Ensembl	ENSG00000176105	ENSMUSG00000014932
UniProt	P07947	Q04736
RefSeq (mRNA)	NM_005433	NM_001205132; NM_001205133; NM_009535
RefSeq (protein)	NP_005424	NP_001192061; NP_001192062; NP_033561
Location (UCSC)	Chr 18: 0.72 – 0.81 Mb	Chr 5: 32.77 – 32.84 Mb
PubMed search
- Wikidata
View/Edit Human	View/Edit Mouse

Tyrosine-protein kinase Yes is a non-receptor tyrosine kinase that in humans is encoded by the YES1 gene.

This gene is the cellular homolog of the Yamaguchi sarcoma virus oncogene. The encoded protein has tyrosine kinase activity and belongs to the src family. This gene lies in close proximity to thymidylate synthase gene on chromosome 18, and a corresponding pseudogene has been found on chromosome 22.

== Interactions ==
YES1 has been shown to interact with Janus kinase 2, CTNND1, RPL10 and Occludin.
