= CLDN11 =

Protein-coding gene in humans

Identifiers
- Aliases: CLDN11, OSP, OTM, claudin 11, HLD22
- External IDs: OMIM: 601326; MGI: 106925; GeneCards: CLDN11

Gene location (Human)
Chr.	Chromosome 3 (human)
Band	3q26.2	Start	170,418,868 bp
Band	3q26.2	End	170,454,733 bp

Gene location (Mouse)
Chr.	Chromosome 3 (mouse)
Band	3 A3|3 15.14 cM	Start	31,204,069 bp
Band	3 A3|3 15.14 cM	End	31,218,473 bp
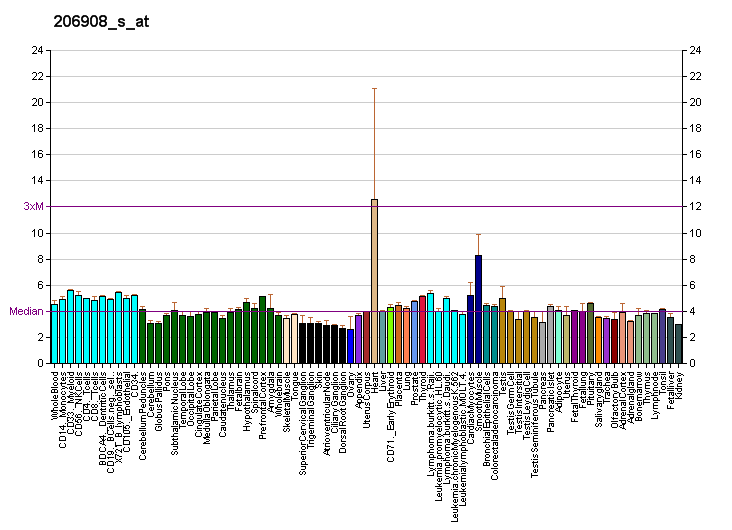
RNA expression pattern
Bgee	Human / Mouse (ortholog); Top expressed in: inferior ganglion of vagus nerve; subthalamic nucleus; superior vestibular nucleus; ventral tegmental area; pons; external globus pallidus; pars reticulata; C1 segment; trigeminal ganglion; pars compacta / Top expressed in: ventral tegmental area; lateral geniculate nucleus; globus pallidus; stria vascularis; deep cerebellar nuclei; pontine nuclei; pineal gland; lateral hypothalamus; medial geniculate nucleus; lumbar subsegment of spinal cord; More reference expression data
BioGPS	More reference expression data
Gene ontology
Molecular function	structural molecule activity; identical protein binding; protein binding
Cellular component	integral component of membrane; cell junction; membrane; bicellular tight junction; plasma membrane
Biological process	calcium-independent cell-cell adhesion via plasma membrane cell-adhesion molecules
Sources:Amigo / QuickGO
Orthologs
Databases	NCBI: entry; OMA: entry
Species	Human	Mouse
Entrez	5010	18417
Ensembl	ENSG00000013297	ENSMUSG00000037625
UniProt	O75508	Q60771
RefSeq (mRNA)	NM_005602; NM_001185056	NM_008770
RefSeq (protein)	NP_001171985; NP_005593	NP_032796
Location (UCSC)	Chr 3: 170.42 – 170.45 Mb	Chr 3: 31.2 – 31.22 Mb
PubMed search
- Wikidata
View/Edit Human	View/Edit Mouse

Claudin-11 is a protein that in humans is encoded by the CLDN11 gene. It belongs to the group of claudins and was the first member of the family to be knocked out in mice, thereby demonstrating the central role of claudins for intramembranous strands observed in freeze-fracture images.

== Function ==
The protein encoded by this gene belongs to the claudin family of tight junction associated proteins and is a major component of central nervous system myelin that is necessary for normal CNS function, hearing, and spermatogenesis. There is growing evidence that the protein determines the permeability between layers of myelin sheaths and, with its expression highly regulated during development, may play an important role in cellular proliferation and migration. In addition, the protein is a candidate autoantigen in the development of autoimmune demyelinating disease. Finally, experiments in Cldn11-null mice demonstrate that behavioral phenotypes in open field tests, as well as defects in sound lateralization, accompany changes in neurotransmitter levels in the amygdala/ventral hippocampus and auditory brainstem. This study reveals a molecular mechanism by which changes to myelin membrane properties in the absence of degenerative pathology, could lead to neuropsychiatric disease in humans.
