= CLDN2 =

Protein-coding gene in humans

Identifiers
- Aliases: CLDN2, claudin 2, OAZON
- External IDs: OMIM: 300520; MGI: 1276110; GeneCards: CLDN2
Available structures
PDB	Ortholog search: PDBe RCSB
PDB	List of PDB id codes 4YYX

Gene location (Human)
Chr.	X chromosome (human)
Band	Xq22.3	Start	106,900,164 bp
Band	Xq22.3	End	106,930,861 bp

Gene location (Mouse)
Chr.	X chromosome (mouse)
Band	X|X F1	Start	138,701,577 bp
Band	X|X F1	End	138,712,135 bp
RNA expression pattern
Bgee	Human / Mouse (ortholog); Top expressed in: pancreatic ductal cell; gallbladder; islet of Langerhans; right lobe of liver; seminal vesicula; renal cortex; renal medulla; duodenum; caput epididymis; human kidney / Top expressed in: Epithelium of choroid plexus; human kidney; proximal tubule; right kidney; choroid plexus of fourth ventricle; crypt of lieberkuhn of small intestine; efferent ductule; left colon; yolk sac; left lobe of liver; More reference expression data
BioGPS	n/a
Gene ontology
Molecular function	protein binding; identical protein binding; structural molecule activity
Cellular component	cell junction; integral component of membrane; bicellular tight junction; plasma membrane; membrane
Biological process	calcium-independent cell-cell adhesion via plasma membrane cell-adhesion molecules
Sources:Amigo / QuickGO
Orthologs
Databases	NCBI: entry; OMA: entry
Species	Human	Mouse
Entrez	9075	12738
Ensembl	ENSG00000165376	ENSMUSG00000047230
UniProt	P57739	O88552
RefSeq (mRNA)	NM_020384; NM_001171092; NM_001171095	NM_016675
RefSeq (protein)	NP_001164563; NP_001164566; NP_065117	NP_057884
Location (UCSC)	Chr X: 106.9 – 106.93 Mb	Chr X: 138.7 – 138.71 Mb
PubMed search
- Wikidata
View/Edit Human	View/Edit Mouse

Claudin-2 is a protein that in humans is encoded by the CLDN2 gene. It belongs to the group of claudins.

Members of the claudin protein family, such as CLDN2, are expressed in an organ-specific manner and regulate the tissue-specific physiologic properties of tight junctions (Sakaguchi et al., 2002).[supplied by OMIM]

== Function ==
Claudin-2 is expressed in cation-leaky epithelia such as that of the kidney proximal tubule. Mice that are deficient in claudin-2 have reduced reabsorption of Na^{+} in the proximal tubule, consistent with a role in paracellular transport. Similar results have been obtained with cultured cells, as overexpression in claudin-2 lacking cells leads to increase of permeability for small cations. Furthermore, claudin-2 has been shown to form paracellular channels for water.
