= Tight junction protein ZO-2 =

Protein found in humans

TJP2
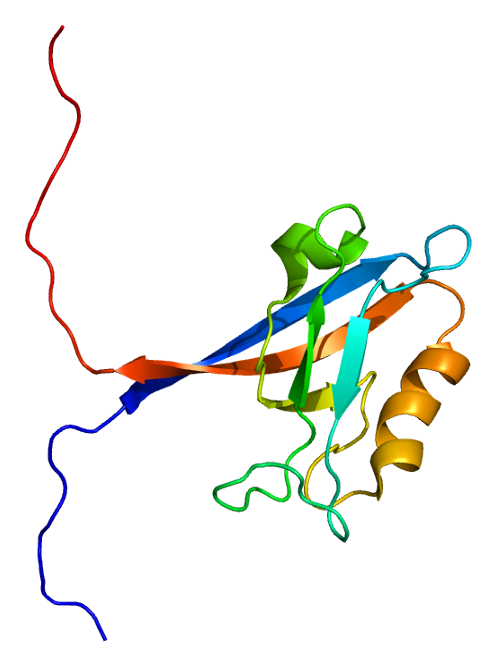

Identifiers
- Aliases: TJP2, C9DUPq21.11, DFNA51, DUP9q21.11, PFIC4, X104, ZO2, Tight junction protein 2, FHCA1
- External IDs: OMIM: 607709; MGI: 1341872; GeneCards: TJP2
Available structures
PDB	Ortholog search: PDBe RCSB
PDB	List of PDB id codes 2OSG, 3E17

Gene location (Human)
Chr.	Chromosome 9 (human)
Band	9q21.11	Start	69,121,264 bp
Band	9q21.11	End	69,274,615 bp

Gene location (Mouse)
Chr.	Chromosome 19 (mouse)
Band	19|19 B	Start	24,071,869 bp
Band	19|19 B	End	24,202,394 bp
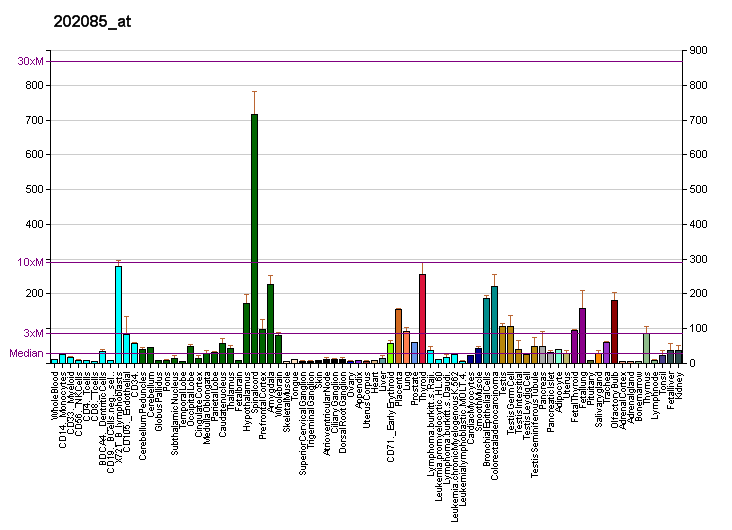
RNA expression pattern
Bgee	Human / Mouse (ortholog); Top expressed in: corpus callosum; Descending thoracic aorta; ascending aorta; right coronary artery; C1 segment; right lung; subcutaneous adipose tissue; duodenum; right lobe of liver; right lobe of thyroid gland / Top expressed in: otic vesicle; saccule; otic placode; vestibular membrane of cochlear duct; Paneth cell; sciatic nerve; conjunctival fornix; left lung lobe; epithelium of stomach; cornea; More reference expression data
BioGPS	More reference expression data
Gene ontology
Molecular function	protein-macromolecule adaptor activity; protein domain specific binding; guanylate kinase activity; protein binding; cadherin binding
Cellular component	membrane; bicellular tight junction; adherens junction; plasma membrane; cell junction; nucleus; cytosol; nucleoplasm
Biological process	establishment of endothelial intestinal barrier; hippo signaling; regulation of membrane permeability; intestinal absorption; GMP metabolic process; GDP metabolic process
Sources:Amigo / QuickGO
Orthologs
Databases	NCBI: entry; OMA: entry
Species	Human	Mouse
Entrez	9414	21873
Ensembl	ENSG00000119139	ENSMUSG00000024812
UniProt	Q9UDY2	Q9Z0U1
RefSeq (mRNA)	NM_001170414; NM_001170415; NM_001170416; NM_001170630; NM_004817 NM_201629; NM_001369870; NM_001369871; NM_001369872; NM_001369873; NM_001369874; NM_001369875	NM_001198985; NM_011597; NM_001360391; NM_001360392; NM_001376368
RefSeq (protein)	NP_001163885; NP_001163886; NP_001163887; NP_004808; NP_963923	NP_001185914; NP_035727; NP_001347320; NP_001347321
Location (UCSC)	Chr 9: 69.12 – 69.27 Mb	Chr 19: 24.07 – 24.2 Mb
PubMed search
- Wikidata
View/Edit Human	View/Edit Mouse

Tight junction protein ZO-2 is a protein that in humans is encoded by the TJP2 gene.

Tight junction proteins (TJPs) belong to a family of membrane-associated guanylate kinase (MAGUK) homologs that are involved in the organization of epithelial and endothelial intercellular junctions. TJPs bind to the cytoplasmic C termini of junctional transmembrane proteins and link them to the actin cytoskeleton [supplied by OMIM].

== Interactions ==
Tight junction protein 2 has been shown to interact with tight junction protein 1, band 4.1, occludin and USP53.
