= TJP3 =

Protein-coding gene in the species Homo sapiens

Identifiers
- Aliases: TJP3, ZO-3, ZO3, tight junction protein 3
- External IDs: OMIM: 612689; MGI: 1351650; GeneCards: TJP3
Available structures
PDB	Ortholog search: PDBe RCSB
PDB	List of PDB id codes 3KFV

Gene location (Human)
Chr.	Chromosome 19 (human)
Band	19p13.3	Start	3,708,362 bp
Band	19p13.3	End	3,750,813 bp

Gene location (Mouse)
Chr.	Chromosome 10 (mouse)
Band	10|10 C1	Start	81,109,041 bp
Band	10|10 C1	End	81,127,415 bp
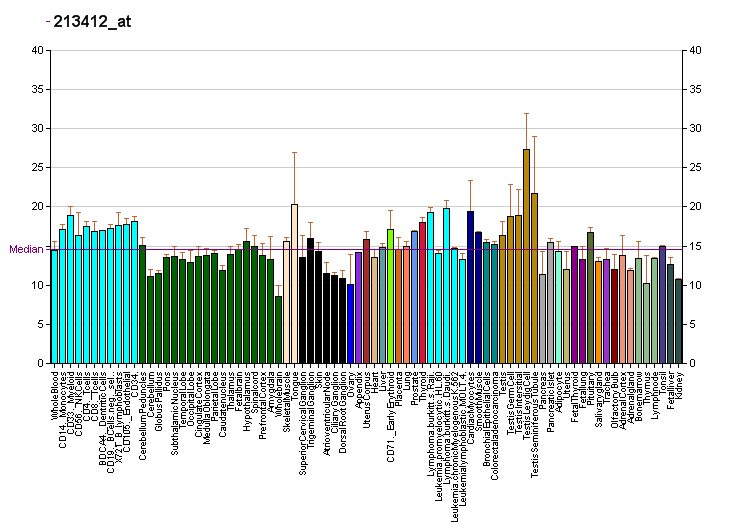
RNA expression pattern
Bgee	Human / Mouse (ortholog); Top expressed in: mucosa of transverse colon; right uterine tube; olfactory zone of nasal mucosa; left testis; right testis; nasal epithelium; buccal mucosa cell; epithelium of bronchus; bronchial epithelial cell; rectum / Top expressed in: crypt of lieberkuhn of small intestine; left colon; ileum; epithelium of stomach; jejunum; intestinal villus; duodenum; mucous cell of stomach; transitional epithelium of urinary bladder; pyloric antrum; More reference expression data
BioGPS	More reference expression data
Orthologs
Databases	NCBI: entry; OMA: entry
Species	Human	Mouse
Entrez	27134	27375
Ensembl	ENSG00000105289	ENSMUSG00000034917
UniProt	O95049	Q9QXY1
RefSeq (mRNA)	NM_014428; NM_001267560; NM_001267561	NM_001282095; NM_001282096; NM_013769
RefSeq (protein)	NP_001254489; NP_001254490	n/a
Location (UCSC)	Chr 19: 3.71 – 3.75 Mb	Chr 10: 81.11 – 81.13 Mb
PubMed search
- Wikidata
View/Edit Human	View/Edit Mouse

Tight junction protein ZO-3 is a protein that in humans is encoded by the TJP3 gene.

== Interactions ==
TJP3 has been shown to interact with tight junction protein 1.
