= CLDN7 =

Protein-coding gene in humans

Identifiers
- Aliases: CLDN7, CEPTRL2, CLDN-7, CPETRL2, Hs.84359, claudin-1, claudin 7
- External IDs: OMIM: 609131; MGI: 1859285; GeneCards: CLDN7

Gene location (Human)
Chr.	Chromosome 17 (human)
Band	17p13.1	Start	7,259,903 bp
Band	17p13.1	End	7,263,983 bp

Gene location (Mouse)
Chr.	Chromosome 11 (mouse)
Band	11|11 B3	Start	69,855,605 bp
Band	11|11 B3	End	69,858,711 bp
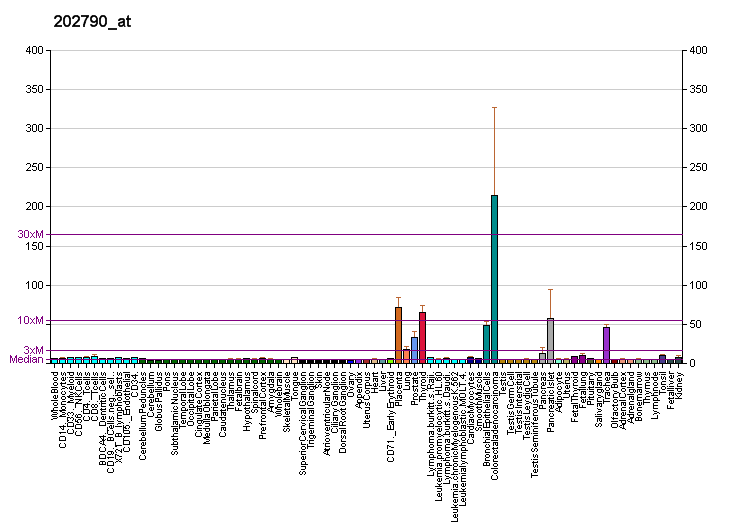
RNA expression pattern
Bgee	Human / Mouse (ortholog); Top expressed in: mucosa of transverse colon; duodenum; rectum; right uterine tube; olfactory zone of nasal mucosa; minor salivary glands; body of pancreas; left lobe of thyroid gland; islet of Langerhans; right lobe of thyroid gland / Top expressed in: crypt of lieberkuhn of small intestine; left colon; migratory enteric neural crest cell; ileum; duodenum; yolk sac; medullary collecting duct; jejunum; mucosa of urinary bladder; transitional epithelium of urinary bladder; More reference expression data
BioGPS	More reference expression data
Gene ontology
Molecular function	structural molecule activity; identical protein binding; protein binding; cell adhesion molecule binding
Cellular component	bicellular tight junction; cell junction; basolateral plasma membrane; membrane; lateral plasma membrane; integral component of membrane; apicolateral plasma membrane; plasma membrane
Biological process	negative regulation of protein homooligomerization; negative regulation of cell adhesion; positive regulation of cell motility; negative regulation of apoptotic process; positive regulation of cell population proliferation; calcium-independent cell-cell adhesion via plasma membrane cell-adhesion molecules; response to ethanol
Sources:Amigo / QuickGO
Orthologs
Databases	NCBI: entry; OMA: entry
Species	Human	Mouse
Entrez	1366	53624
Ensembl	ENSG00000181885; ENSG00000288292	ENSMUSG00000018569
UniProt	O95471	Q9Z261
RefSeq (mRNA)	NM_001307; NM_001185022; NM_001185023	NM_001193619; NM_016887
RefSeq (protein)	NP_001171951; NP_001171952; NP_001298	NP_001180548; NP_058583
Location (UCSC)	Chr 17: 7.26 – 7.26 Mb	Chr 11: 69.86 – 69.86 Mb
PubMed search
- Wikidata
View/Edit Human	View/Edit Mouse

Claudin-7 is a protein that in humans is encoded by the CLDN7 gene. It belongs to the group of claudins.

Claudins, such as CLDN7, are involved in the formation of tight junctions between epithelial cells. Tight junctions restrict lateral diffusion of lipids and membrane proteins, and thereby physically define the border between the apical and basolateral compartments of epithelial cells (Zheng et al., 2003).[supplied by OMIM]
