= Occludin =

Mammalian protein found in Homo sapiens

OCLN
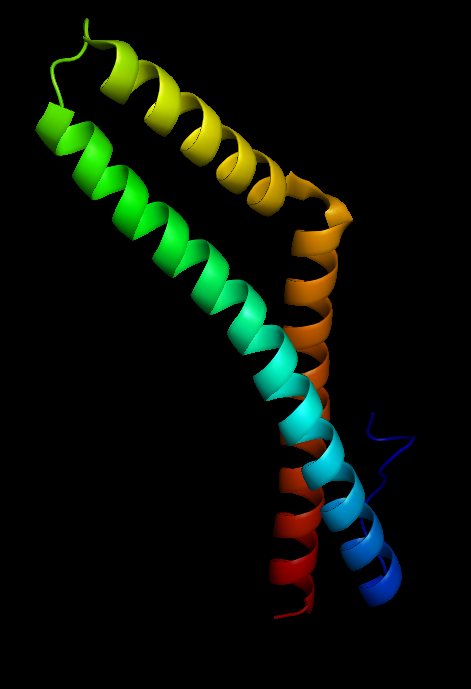

Identifiers
- Aliases: OCLN, BLCPMG, PPP1R115, occludin, PTORCH1
- External IDs: OMIM: 602876; MGI: 106183; GeneCards: OCLN
Available structures
PDB	Ortholog search: PDBe RCSB
PDB	List of PDB id codes 1WPA, 1XAW, 3G7C

Gene location (Human)
Chr.	Chromosome 5 (human)
Band	5q13.2	Start	69,492,292 bp
Band	5q13.2	End	69,558,104 bp

Gene location (Mouse)
Chr.	Chromosome 13 (mouse)
Band	13 D1|13 53.23 cM	Start	100,633,015 bp
Band	13 D1|13 53.23 cM	End	100,689,226 bp
RNA expression pattern
Bgee	Human / Mouse (ortholog); Top expressed in: islet of Langerhans; mucosa of ileum; pancreatic ductal cell; right lobe of thyroid gland; body of pancreas; left lobe of thyroid gland; gonad; sural nerve; rectum; right lung / Top expressed in: choroid plexus of fourth ventricle; left colon; jejunum; duodenum; ileum; seminal vesicula; right lung lobe; migratory enteric neural crest cell; stomach; left lung lobe; More reference expression data
BioGPS	n/a
Gene ontology
Molecular function	protein domain specific binding; protein binding
Cellular component	integral component of membrane; membrane; cell-cell junction; bicellular tight junction; plasma membrane; endocytic vesicle; apicolateral plasma membrane; apical plasma membrane; cytoplasmic vesicle; lateral plasma membrane; cell junction
Biological process	cell-cell junction organization; bicellular tight junction assembly; response to interleukin-18; cellular response to tumor necrosis factor; regulation of bicellular tight junction assembly; protein-containing complex assembly
Sources:Amigo / QuickGO
Orthologs
Databases	NCBI: entry; OMA: entry
Species	Human	Mouse
Entrez	100506658	18260
Ensembl	ENSG00000197822; ENSG00000273814	ENSMUSG00000021638
UniProt	Q16625	Q61146
RefSeq (mRNA)	NM_002538; NM_001205254; NM_001205255	NM_008756; NM_001360536; NM_001360537; NM_001360538; NM_001360539
RefSeq (protein)	NP_001192183; NP_001192184; NP_002529	NP_032782; NP_001347465; NP_001347466; NP_001347467; NP_001347468
Location (UCSC)	Chr 5: 69.49 – 69.56 Mb	Chr 13: 100.63 – 100.69 Mb
PubMed search
- Wikidata
View/Edit Human	View/Edit Mouse

Diagram of Tight junction.

Occludin is a transmembrane protein that regulates the permeability of epithelial and endothelial barriers. It was first identified in epithelial cells as a 65 kDa integral plasma-membrane protein localized at the tight junctions. Together with Claudins, and zonula occludens-1 (ZO-1), occludin has been considered a staple of tight junctions, and although it was shown to regulate the formation, maintenance, and function of tight junctions, its precise mechanism of action remained elusive and most of its actions were initially attributed to conformational changes following selective phosphorylation, and its redox-sensitive dimerization. However, mounting evidence demonstrated that occludin is not only present in epithelial/endothelial cells, but is also expressed in large quantities in cells that do not have tight junctions but have very active metabolism: pericytes, neurons and astrocytes, oligodendrocytes, dendritic cells, monocytes/macrophages lymphocytes, and myocardium. Recent work, using molecular modeling, supported by biochemical and live-cell experiments in human cells demonstrated that occludin is a NADH oxidase that influences critical aspects of cell metabolism like glucose uptake, ATP production and gene expression. Furthermore, manipulation of occludin content in human cells is capable of influencing the expression of glucose transporters, and the activation of transcription factors like NFkB, and histone deacetylases like sirtuins, which proved capable of diminishing HIV replication rates in infected human macrophages under laboratory conditions.

== Gene location ==
In humans is encoded by the OCLN gene located on the long (q) arm of chromosome 5 at position q13.1. The canonical gene is 65,813 base pairs long, spanning base pairs 69,492,292 to 69,558,104. Its product is 522 amino acids long.

== Protein structure ==
Occludin's structure can be broken down into 9 domains. These domains are separated into two groups. 5 of the domains are located intracellularly and extracellularly. These 5 domains are separated by the 4 transmembrane domains of the protein. The nine domains are as follows:

- N-terminus domain (66 aa)
- transmembrane domain 1 (23 aa)
- extracellular loop 1 (46 aa)
- transmembrane domain 2 (25 aa)
- intracellular loop (10 aa)
- transmembrane domain 3 (25 aa)
- extracellular domain 2 (48 aa)
- transmembrane domain 4 (22 aa)
- C-terminus domain (257 aa)

The C-terminus domain has been shown experimentally to be required for correct assembly of tight junction barrier function. The C-terminus also interacts with several cytoplasmic proteins of the junctional plaque and interacts with signaling molecules responsible for cell survival. The N-terminus of occludin experimentally has been linked to involvement in tight junction sealing/barrier properties. The extracellular loops are thought to be involved in the regulation of paracellular permeability and the second extracellular has been shown to be involved in the localization of occludin at the tight junction.

== Function ==
Occludin is an important protein in tight junction function. Studies have shown that rather than being important in tight junction assembly, occludin is important in tight junction stability and barrier function. Indeed, MDCK cells lacking occludin and its homolog tricellulin exhibit less complex tight junction strand network and impaired barrier function. Furthermore, studies in which mice were deprived of occludin expression showed morphological stability in several epithelial tissues but also found chronic inflammation and hyperplasia in the gastric epithelium, calcification in the brain, testicular atrophy, loss of cytoplasmic granules in straited duct cells of salivary gland, and thinning of the compact bone. The phenotypical response of these mice to the lack of occludin suggest that the function of occludin is more complex than thought and requires more work.

== Role in cancer ==
Occludin plays a critical role in maintaining the barrier properties of a tight junction. Thus, mutation or absence of occludin increases epithelial leakiness which is an important barrier in preventing metastasis of cancer. Loss of occludin or abnormal expression of occludin has been shown to cause increased invasion, reduced adhesion and significantly reduced tight junction function in breast cancer tissues. Furthermore, patients with metastatic disease displayed significantly lower levels of occludin suggesting that the loss of occludin and thereby loss of tight junction integrity is important in metastatic development of breast cancer.

Occludin also plays an important role in the apoptosis. The C-terminus of occludin is important in receiving and transmitting cell survival signals. In standard cells, loss or disruption of occludin and other tight junction proteins leads to initiation of apoptosis through extrinsic pathways. Studies involving high levels of expression of occludin in cancer cells have shown that occludin mitigates several important cancer proliferation properties. The presence of occludin decreased cellular invasiveness and motility, enhanced cellular sensitivity to apoptogenic factors and lowered tumorigenesis and metastasis of the cancer cells. Specifically, occludin has a strong inhibitory effect on Raf1-induced tumorigenesis. Still, the exact mechanism of how occludin prevents the progression of cancer is not known but it has been shown that cancer progression is linked to the loss of occludin or the silencing of the OCLN gene.

== Disease linkage ==
Disruption of occludin regulation is an important aspect of a number of diseases. Strategies to prevent and/or reverse occludin downregulation may be an important therapeutic target. Mutation of occludin are thought to be a cause of band-like calcification with simple gyration and polymicrogyria (BLC-PMG). BLC-PMG is an autosomal recessive neurologic disorder.

== Interactions ==
Occludin has been shown to interact with Tight junction protein 2, YES1 and Tight junction protein 1 (ZO-1).
