= Tight junction =

Structure preventing inter-cell leakage

Tight junctions
- Diagram of tight junction

Details

Identifiers
- Latin: junctio occludens
- MeSH: D019108
- TH: H1.00.01.1.02007
- FMA: 67397

Tight junctions, also known as occluding junctions or zonulae occludentes (singular, zonula occludens), are multiprotein junctional complexes between epithelial cells, sealing and preventing leakage of solutes and water. They also play a critical role maintaining the structure and permeability of endothelial cells. Tight junctions may also serve as leaky pathways by forming selective channels for small cations, anions, or water. The corresponding junctions that occur in invertebrates are septate junctions.

== Structure ==
Tight junctions are composed of a branching network of sealing strands, each strand acting independently from the others. Therefore, the efficiency of the junction in preventing ion passage increases exponentially with the number of strands. Each strand is formed from a row of transmembrane proteins embedded in both plasma membranes, with extracellular domains joining one another directly. There are at least 40 different proteins composing the tight junctions. These proteins consist of both transmembrane and cytoplasmic proteins. The three major transmembrane proteins are occludin, claudins, and junction adhesion molecule (JAM) proteins. These associate with different peripheral membrane proteins such as ZO-1 located on the intracellular side of plasma membrane, which anchor the strands to the actin component of the cytoskeleton. In this way, tight junctions join together the cytoskeletons of adjacent cells. Investigation using freeze-fracture methods in electron microscopy is ideal for revealing the lateral extent of tight junctions in cell membranes and has been useful in showing how tight junctions are formed.

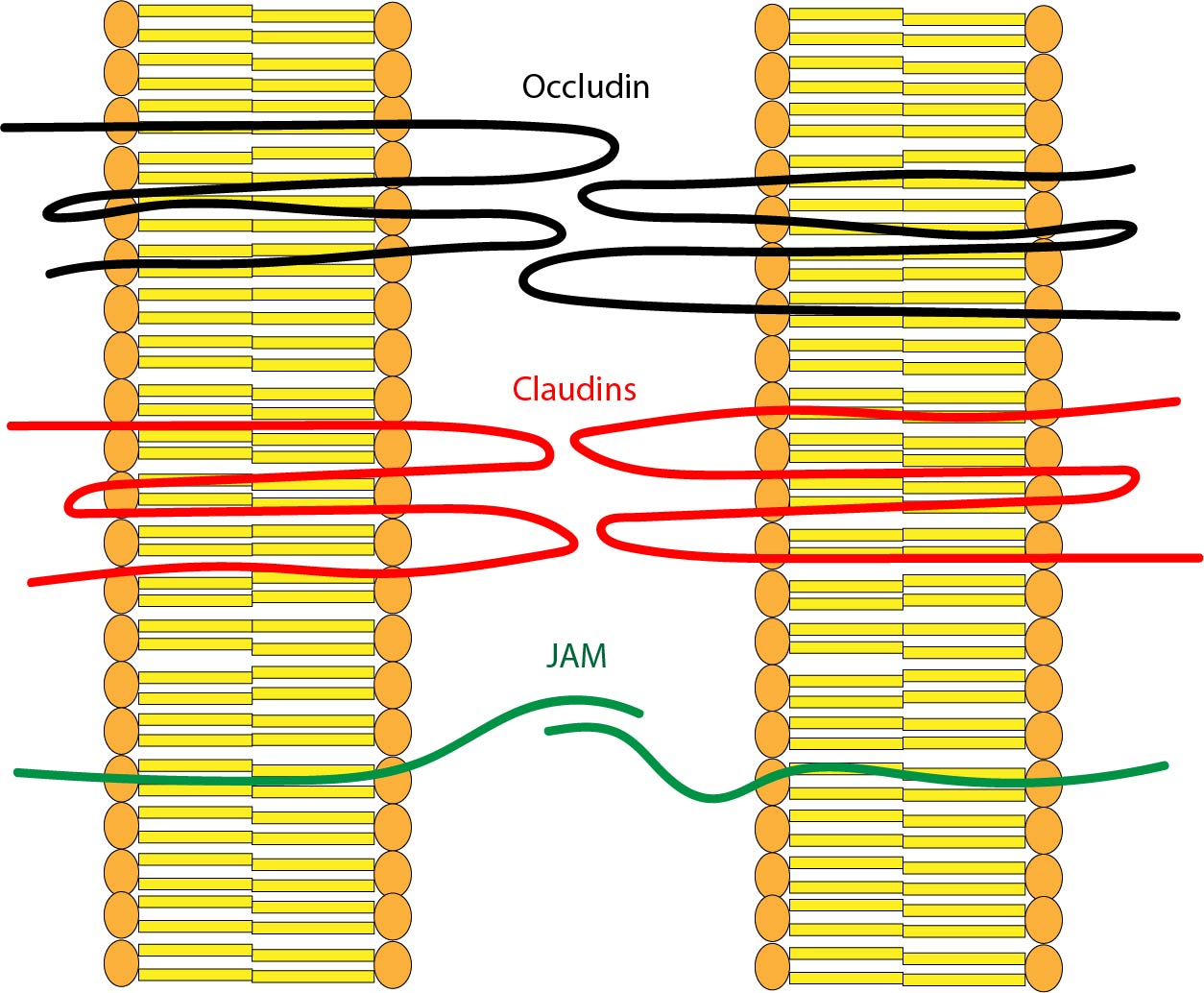
Depiction of the transmembrane proteins that make up tight junctions: occludin, claudins, and JAM proteins.

- Occludin was the first integral membrane protein to be identified. It has a molecular weight of ~60kDa. It consists of four transmembrane domains and both the N-terminus and the C-terminus of the protein are intracellular. It forms two extracellular loops and one intracellular loop. These loops help regulate paracellular permeability. Occludin also plays a key role in cellular structure and barrier function, though it does not contribute as much to barrier integrity as claudins. Occludin has been implicated as important for tight junction modulation, and one study has demonstrated that occludin acts as a signal in the caspase apoptosis pathway when claudin-claudin interactions are disturbed at the tight junction.
- Claudins were discovered after occludin and are a family of over 27 different members in mammals. They have a molecular weight of ~20kDa. They have a structure similar to that of occludin in that they have four transmembrane domains and similar loop structure. They are understood to be the backbone of tight junctions and play a significant role in the tight junction's ability to seal the paracellular space.
- Junctional Adhesion Molecules (JAM) are part of the immunoglobulin superfamily. They have a molecular weight of ~40 to 48 kDa. Their structure differs from that of the other integral membrane proteins in that they only have one transmembrane domain instead of four. It helps to regulate the paracellular pathway function of tight junctions and is also involved in helping to maintain cell polarity. As part of the immunoglobin superfamily, JAMs have important roles as signaling molecules. Recently, JAMs were implicated as a vital component of the Leukocyte adhesion cascade. This allows Leukocytes to migrate out of the blood stream and into neighboring tissues by interacting with JAMs at the tight junction.
- Angulins were discovered in 2011 by visual screening of proteins which localize at tricellular tight junctions. There are three members of angulins, Angulin-1/LSR, Angulin-2/ILDR1, and Angulin-3/ILDR2. Similar to JAMs, angulins are single-transmembrane proteins. All angulins have one immunoglobulin-like domain in the extracellular region and one PDZ-binding motif at the carboxy-terminus. They are responsible for establishment of tricellular tight junctions and regulate the paracellular barrier function.
- Zonula Occludens-1 (ZO-1) and Zonula Occludens-2 (ZO-2) serve as major scaffolding proteins for the tight junction. This means that they support the formation of claudin-based fibrils and links the tight junction proteins to the f-actin cytoskeleton. In addition to anchoring claudins, occludin, and JAMs to the apical region of the cell membrane, ZO-1 has also been implicated in important cellular processes such as migration, and proliferation. This indicates the protein as an important player in the physiological role of healing.
- Cingulin family proteins (cingulin and paracingulin/JACOP) tether nonmuscle myosin 2A and 2B to tight junctions and adherens junctions by binding to ZO-1 and PLEKHA7, and paracingulin tethers microtubules to ZO-1 by interacting with the microtubule minus-end binding protein CAMSAP3, thus providing additional linkage to the cytoskeleton.

== Functions ==
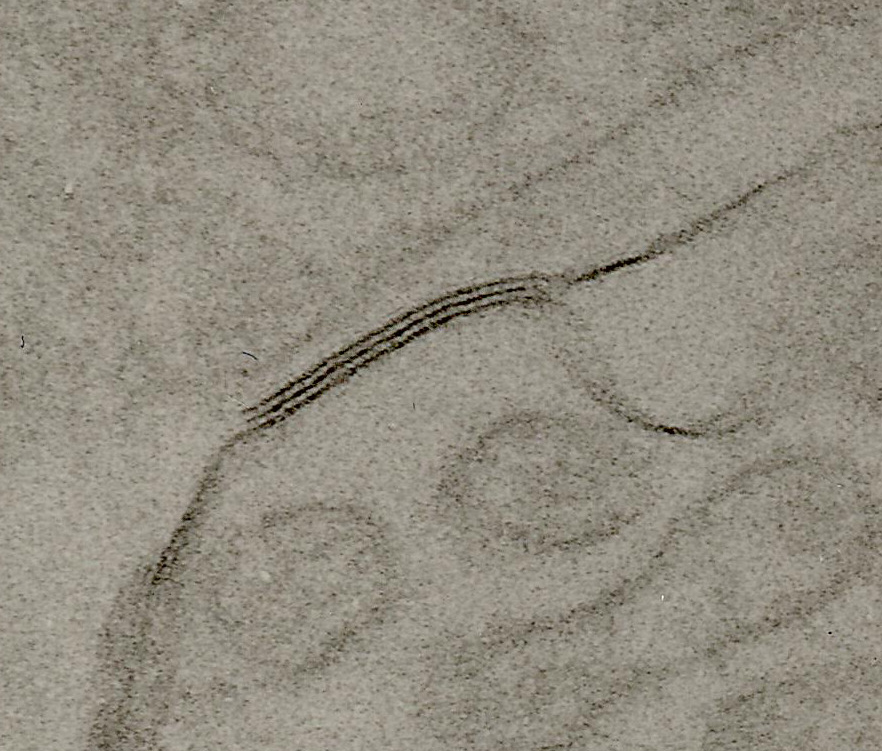
TEM of rat kidney tissue shows a protein dense tight junction (three dark lines) at ~55,000x magnification.

Tight junctions provide endothelial and epithelial cells with barrier function, which can be further subdivided into protective barriers and functional barriers serving purposes such as material transport and maintenance of osmotic balance.

Tight junctions prevent the passage of molecules and ions through the intercellular space of adjacent cells, so materials must actually enter the cells (by diffusion or active transport) in order to pass through the tissue. The constrained intracellular pathway exacted by the tight junction barrier system allows precise control over which substances can pass through a particular tissue (e.g. the blood–brain barrier). At the present time, it is still unclear whether the control is active or passive and how these pathways are formed. In one study for paracellular transport across the tight junction in kidney proximal tubule, a dual pathway model was proposed, consisting of large slit breaks formed by infrequent discontinuities in the tight junction complex and numerous small circular pores.

Tight junctions also help maintain the apicobasal polarity of cells by preventing the lateral diffusion of integral membrane proteins between the apical and lateral/basal surfaces, allowing the specialized functions of each surface (for example receptor-mediated endocytosis at the apical surface and exocytosis at the basolateral surface) to be preserved. This allows polarized transcellular transport and specialized functions of apical and basolateral membranes.

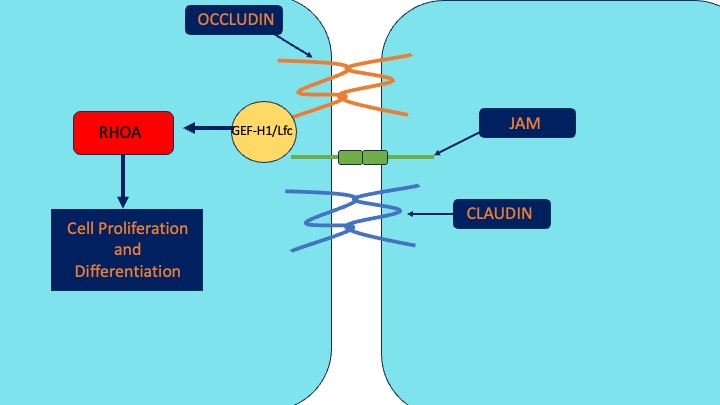
Occludin interacting with GEF-H1/Lfc, which then activates RHOA, a regulator of cell differentiation and motility.

Although classically known for their role in the prevention of paracellular transport, tight junction proteins also play crucial roles as signaling molecules. Occludin is able to interact with signaling pathways controlling cellular differentiation, and has been shown to travel to the nucleus of cells in which the tight junction has been disrupted. There it interacts with transcription factors to initiate apoptosis. ZO-1 is able to regulate cellular migration and proliferation, inhibiting proliferation transcription factors when the cellular tight junction has been established. Claudins, and angulins, like ZO-1, have been shown to interact with several important transcription factors influencing cellular migration and proliferation. These functions of tight junction proteins make the tight junction an important area of study in cancer research.

== Classification ==
Epithelia are classed as "tight" or "leaky", depending on the ability of the tight junctions to prevent water and solute movement:

- Tight epithelia have tight junctions that prevent most movement between cells. Examples of tight epithelia include the distal convoluted tubule, the collecting duct of the nephron in the kidney, and the bile ducts ramifying through liver tissue. Other examples are the blood-brain barrier and the blood cerebrospinal fluid barrier
- Leaky epithelia do not have these tight junctions or have less complex tight junctions. For instance, the tight junction in the kidney proximal tubule, a very leaky epithelium, has only two to three junctional strands, and these strands exhibit infrequent large slit breaks.

== Role in disease ==
The herpes simplex virus can spread between epithelial cells by crossing the space isolated by tight junctions, thereby avoiding the host's immune response and anti-HSV antibodies.

== See also ==
- Cadherin
- Gap junction
- Tight junction protein (disambiguation)
- Zonulin
- Adherens junction
