= Tight junction protein ZO-1 =

Protein found in humans

TJP1
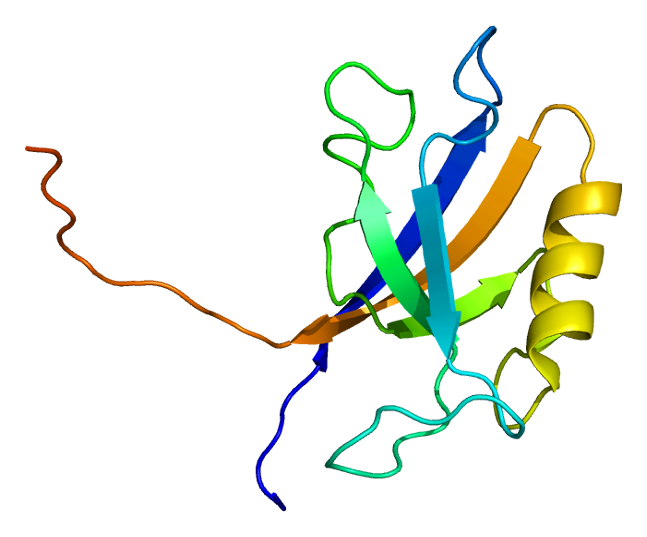

Identifiers
- Aliases: TJP1, ZO-1, Tight junction protein 1
- External IDs: OMIM: 601009; MGI: 98759; GeneCards: TJP1
Available structures
PDB	Ortholog search: PDBe RCSB
PDB	List of PDB id codes 2H2B, 2H2C, 2H3M, 2JWE, 2KXR, 2KXS, 2RCZ, 3CYY, 3LH5, 3SHU, 3SHW, 3TSV, 3TSW, 3TSZ, 4OEO, 4OEP, 4Q2Q, 4YYX

Gene location (Human)
Chr.	Chromosome 15 (human)
Band	15q13.1	Start	29,699,367 bp
Band	15q13.1	End	29,968,915 bp

Gene location (Mouse)
Chr.	Chromosome 7 (mouse)
Band	7 C|7 35.02 cM	Start	64,945,913 bp
Band	7 C|7 35.02 cM	End	65,177,529 bp
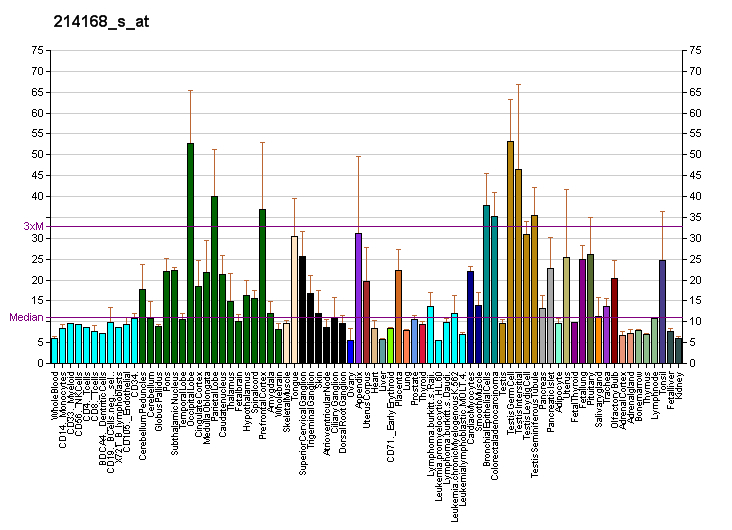

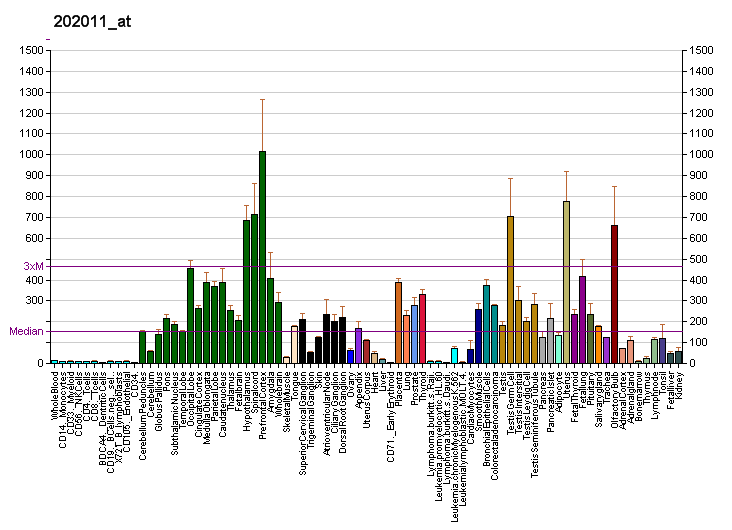
RNA expression pattern
Bgee	Human / Mouse (ortholog); Top expressed in: corpus callosum; sural nerve; placenta; tibial arteries; right lung; smooth muscle tissue; Achilles tendon; endometrium; epithelium of colon; C1 segment / Top expressed in: left lung lobe; vestibular sensory epithelium; gastrula; vestibular membrane of cochlear duct; utricle; stria vascularis; external carotid artery; cumulus cell; epithelium of lens; iris; More reference expression data
BioGPS	More reference expression data
Gene ontology
Molecular function	calmodulin binding; protein binding; cadherin binding; protein domain specific binding; connexin binding; protein C-terminus binding
Cellular component	membrane; bicellular tight junction; plasma membrane; basolateral plasma membrane; gap junction; apical junction complex; cytosol; cytoplasm; apical part of cell; cell junction; podosome; cell projection; nucleus; cell-cell junction; adherens junction; intercalated disc; apical plasma membrane; apicolateral plasma membrane; intercellular canaliculus; tight junctions; protein-containing complex
Biological process	establishment of endothelial intestinal barrier; hippo signaling; cell-cell junction assembly; regulation of bicellular tight junction assembly; blastocyst formation; hearing; response to lipopolysaccharide; negative regulation of vascular permeability; response to ethanol; response to magnetism; cellular response to glucose stimulus
Sources:Amigo / QuickGO
Orthologs
Databases	NCBI: entry; OMA: entry
Species	Human	Mouse
Entrez	7082	21872
Ensembl	ENSG00000277401; ENSG00000104067	ENSMUSG00000030516
UniProt	Q07157	P39447
RefSeq (mRNA)	NM_001301025; NM_001301026; NM_003257; NM_175610; NM_001330239 NM_001355012; NM_001355013; NM_001355014; NM_001355015	NM_001163574; NM_009386
RefSeq (protein)	NP_001287954; NP_001287955; NP_001317168; NP_003248; NP_783297 NP_001341941; NP_001341942; NP_001341943; NP_001341944; NP_001287954.1; NP_001287955.1	NP_001157046; NP_033412
Location (UCSC)	Chr 15: 29.7 – 29.97 Mb	Chr 7: 64.95 – 65.18 Mb
PubMed search
- Wikidata
View/Edit Human	View/Edit Mouse

Tight junction protein ZO-1 also known as Zonula Occludens-1 (ZO-1), is a 220-kD peripheral membrane protein that is encoded by the TJP1 gene in humans. It belongs to the family of zonula occludens proteins (ZO-1, ZO-2, and ZO-3), which are tight junction-associated proteins and of which, ZO-1 is the first to be cloned. It was first isolated in 1986 by Stevenson and Goodenough using a monoclonal antibody raised in rodent liver to recognise a 225-kD polypeptide in whole liver homogenates and in tight junction-enriched membrane fractions. It has a role as a scaffold protein which cross-links and anchors Tight Junction (TJ) strand proteins, which are fibril-like structures within the lipid bilayer, to the actin cytoskeleton.

== Function ==
This gene encodes a protein located on a cytoplasmic membrane surface of intercellular tight junctions. The encoded protein may be involved in signal transduction at cell–cell junctions. Two transcript variants encoding distinct isoforms have been identified for this gene.

== Interactions ==
Tight junction protein 1 has been shown to interact with:

- F11 receptor,
- GJA3,
- GJA8,
- Gap junction protein, alpha 1,
- KIRREL,
- MLLT4,
- Occludin,
- TJP3, and
- Tight junction protein 2.

== See also ==
- Tight junction
