= DNAJC30 =

Protein-coding gene in the species Homo sapiens

Identifiers
- Aliases: DNAJC30, WBSCR18, DnaJ heat shock protein family (Hsp40) member C30, MC1DN38, LHONAR
- External IDs: OMIM: 618202; MGI: 1913364; GeneCards: DNAJC30
Available structures
PDB	Ortholog search: PDBe RCSB
PDB	List of PDB id codes 2YUA

Gene location (Human)
Chr.	Chromosome 7 (human)
Band	7q11.23	Start	73,680,918 bp
Band	7q11.23	End	73,683,453 bp

Gene location (Mouse)
Chr.	Chromosome 5 (mouse)
Band	5|5 G2	Start	135,093,056 bp
Band	5|5 G2	End	135,094,716 bp
RNA expression pattern
Bgee	Human / Mouse (ortholog); Top expressed in: tibialis anterior muscle; pancreatic ductal cell; mucosa of ileum; endothelial cell; myocardium of left ventricle; skin of arm; pons; deltoid muscle; cardiac muscle tissue of right atrium; right adrenal gland / Top expressed in: proximal tubule; right kidney; muscle of thigh; muscle tissue; striatum of neuraxis; human kidney; skeletal muscle tissue; quadriceps femoris muscle; urinary bladder; heart; More reference expression data
BioGPS	n/a
Gene ontology
Molecular function	protein binding
Cellular component	cytosol; mitochondrial inner membrane; mitochondrion; membrane; integral component of membrane
Biological process	brain development; regulation of mitochondrial ATP synthesis coupled proton transport; ATP biosynthetic process
Sources:Amigo / QuickGO
Orthologs
Databases	NCBI: entry; OMA: entry
Species	Human	Mouse
Entrez	84277	66114
Ensembl	ENSG00000176410	ENSMUSG00000061118
UniProt	Q96LL9	P59041
RefSeq (mRNA)	NM_032317	NM_025362
RefSeq (protein)	NP_115693	NP_079638
Location (UCSC)	Chr 7: 73.68 – 73.68 Mb	Chr 5: 135.09 – 135.09 Mb
PubMed search
- Wikidata
View/Edit Human	View/Edit Mouse

DnaJ homolog subfamily C member 30 (DNAJC30), also known as Williams Beuren syndrome chromosome region 18 protein (WBSCR18), is a protein that in humans is encoded by the DNAJC30 gene. This intronless gene encodes a member of the DNAJ molecular chaperone homology domain-containing protein family. This gene is deleted in Williams syndrome, a multisystem developmental disorder caused by the deletion of contiguous genes at 7q11.23.

== Structure ==
The DNAJC30 gene is an intronless gene composed of only one exon, with the chromosome location 7q11.23 in humans. Its open reading frame (ORF) consists of 681 bp in the human cDNA and 660 bp in the mouse cDNA, which encode proteins of 226 and 219 residues, respectively. They are members of the DNAJ molecular chaperone homology domain-containing protein family.

== Function ==
DNAJC30 is expressed in many tissues, including the brain, heart, kidney, liver, lung, spleen, stomach, and testis, though no transcripts were found in colon, small intestine, and muscle. This protein has been found to localize to the cytosol and mitochondria of cells. Though its exact biological function has yet to be elucidated, the centromeric location of DNAJC30 on the chromosome has led Merla et al. to postulate that it may contribute to functions such as subtle defects in cognition, transient hypercalcemia, and gastrointestinal problems experienced by Williams Beuren syndrome patients. A recent study found that DNAJC30 functionally links to the mitochondrial ATP synthase and influences brain development which proves the involvement in Williams Beuren syndrome.

== Clinical significance ==
This gene is one of several contiguous genes located at 7q11.23 deleted in Williams Beuren syndrome, the others including: elastin, FKBP6, FZD9 (FZD3), BAZ1B (WSTF, WBSCR9), BCL7B, TBL2 (WS-βTRP), WBSCR14 (WS-bHLH), STX1A, CLDN3 (CPETR2, RVP1), CLDN4 (CPETR1), LIMK1, EIF4H (WBSCR1), WBSCR15 (WBSCR5), RFC2, CYLN2 (CLIP-115, WBSCR4, WBSCR3), GTF2IRD1 (WBSCR11, GTF3), and GTF2I (BAP135, SPIN). Williams Beuren syndrome is a neurodevelopmental disorder characterized by congenital heart and vascular disease, hypertension, infantile hypercalcemia, dental abnormalities, dysmorphic facial features, intellectual disability, premature aging of the skin, and unique cognitive and personality profiles. While haploinsufficiency of elastin is known to cause the cardiovascular deficiencies, the roles of the other 24-26 genes in the deleted region, including DNAJC30, have yet to be confirmed.
