= Clostridium enterotoxin =

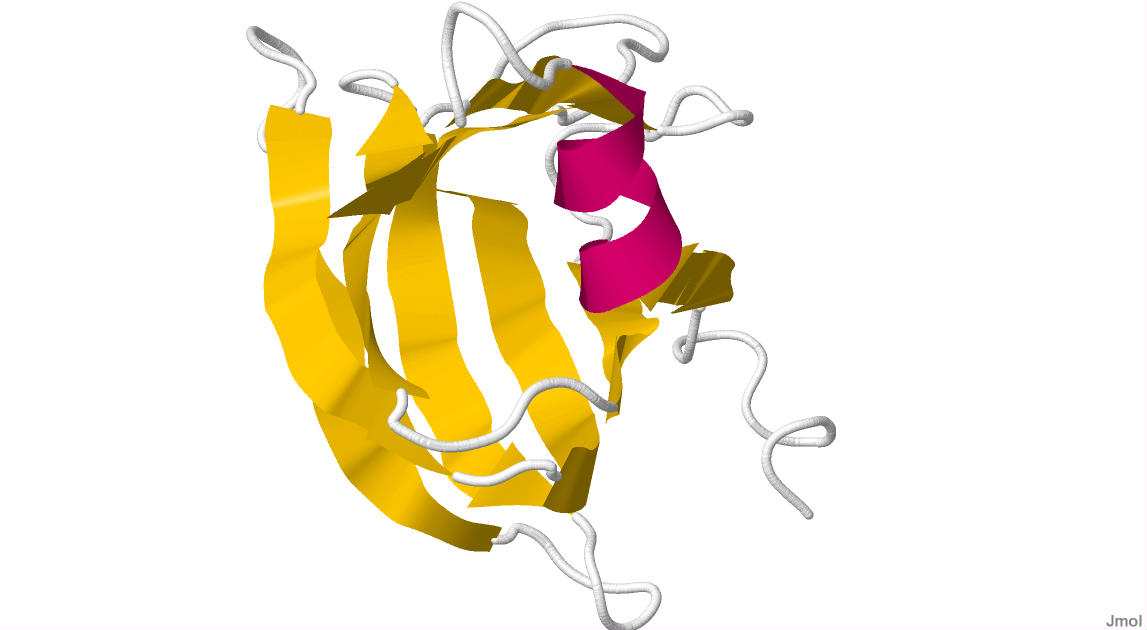
- Crystal Structure of C terminal fragment of Clostridium perfringens enterotoxin

Identifiers
- Symbol: Clenterotox
- Pfam: PF03505
- InterPro: IPR003897
- TCDB: 1.C.59
Available protein structures:
- Pfam: structures / ECOD
- PDB: RCSB PDB; PDBe; PDBj
- PDBsum: structure summary

Clostridium enterotoxins are toxins produced by Clostridium species. Clostridial species are one of the major causes of food poisoning/gastrointestinal illnesses. They are anaerobic, gram-positive, spore-forming rods that occur naturally in the soil. Among the family are: Clostridium botulinum, which produces one of the most potent toxins in existence; Clostridium tetani, causative agent of tetanus; and Clostridium perfringens, commonly found in wound infections and diarrhea cases.

The major virulence factor of C. perfringens is the CPE enterotoxin, which is secreted upon invasion of the host gut, and contributes to food poisoning and other gastrointestinal illnesses. It has a molecular weight of 35.3 kDa, and is responsible for the disintegration of tight junctions between epithelial cells in the gut. This mechanism is mediated by host claudin-3 and claudin-4 receptors, situated at the tight junctions.

Clostridium enterotoxin is a nine-stranded beta sheet sandwich in shape. It has been determined that it is very similar to other spore-forming bacteria. The binding site is between beta sheets eight and nine. This allows the human claudin-3,4,6,7,8 and 14 to bind but not 1,2,5, and 10. The way the protein work is it destroys the cell membrane structure of animals by binding to claudin family proteins. These are components of tight junctions of the epithelial cell membrane.
