= Williams syndrome =

Genetic disorder

- Other names: Williams–Beuren syndrome (WBS)
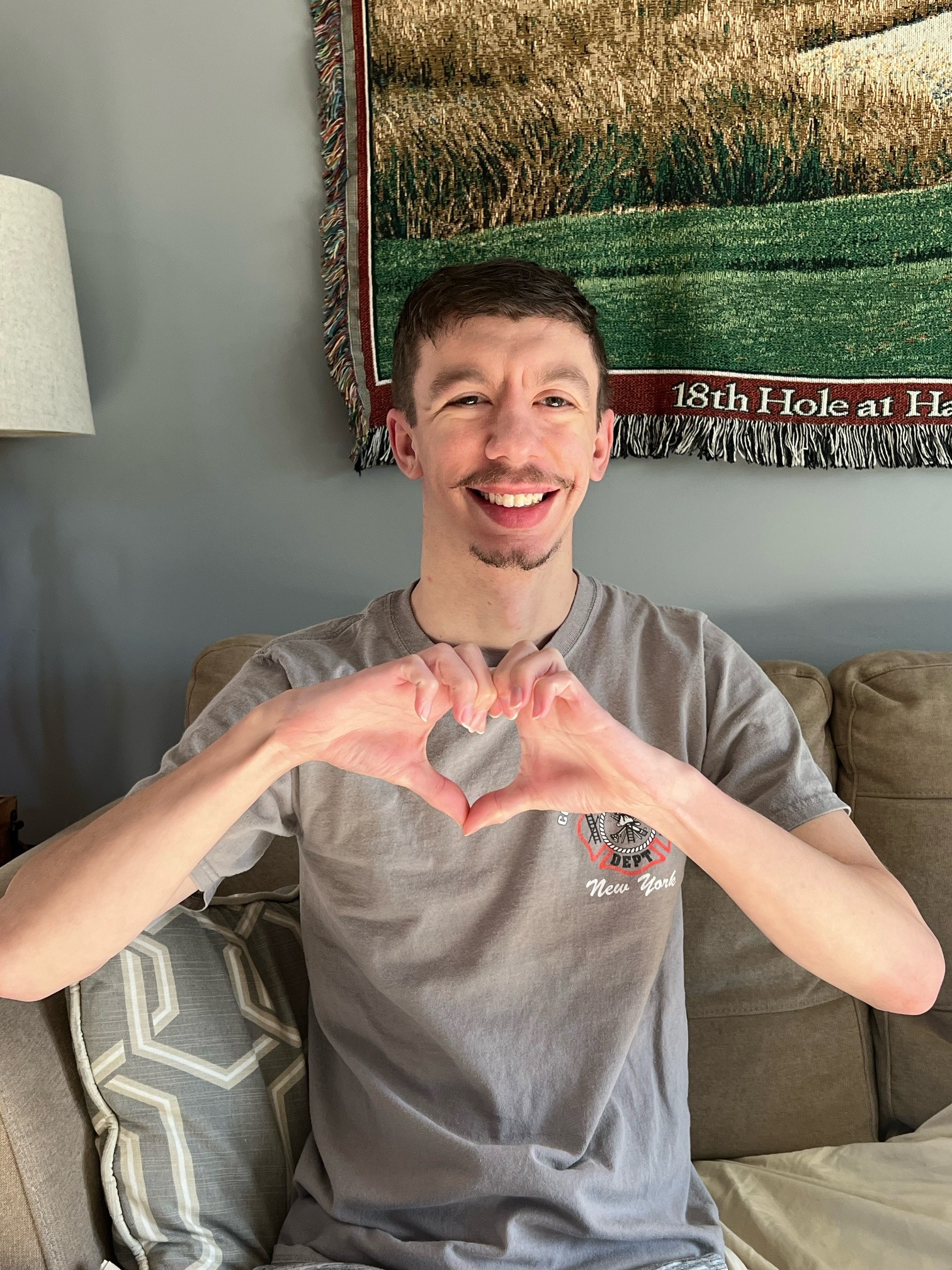
- A man with Williams syndrome
- Specialty: Medical genetics, pediatrics
- Symptoms: Facial changes including underdeveloped chin structure, intellectual disability, overly friendly nature, short height
- Complications: Heart problems, periods of high blood calcium
- Duration: Lifelong
- Causes: Genetic
- Differential diagnosis: Noonan syndrome, fetal alcohol syndrome, DiGeorge syndrome, autism spectrum disorder
- Treatment: Various types of therapy
- Prognosis: Mildly decreased life expectancy
- Frequency: 1 in 7,500 to 1 in 20,000

Williams syndrome (WS), also Williams–Beuren syndrome (WBS), is a genetic disorder that affects many parts of the body. Facial features frequently include a broad forehead, underdeveloped chin, short nose, and full cheeks. Mild to moderate intellectual disability is observed, particularly challenges with visual spatial tasks such as drawing. Verbal skills are relatively unaffected. Many people with Williams Syndrome have an outgoing personality, a happy disposition, an openness to engaging with other people, increased empathy and decreased aggression. Medical issues with teeth, heart problems (especially supravalvular aortic stenosis), and periods of high blood calcium are common.

Williams syndrome is caused by a genetic abnormality, specifically a deletion of about 27 genes from the long arm of one of the two chromosome 7s. Typically, this occurs as a random event during the formation of the egg or sperm from which a person develops. In a small number of cases, it is inherited from an affected parent in an autosomal dominant manner. The different characteristic features have been linked to the loss of specific genes. The diagnosis is typically suspected based on symptoms and confirmed by genetic testing.

Interventions include special education programs and various types of therapy. Surgery may be performed to correct heart problems. Dietary changes or medications may be required for high blood calcium. The syndrome was first described in 1961 by New Zealander John C. P. Williams. Williams syndrome affects between one in 7,500 to 20,000 people at birth. Life expectancy is less than that of the general population, mostly due to the increased rates of heart disease.

== Signs and symptoms ==
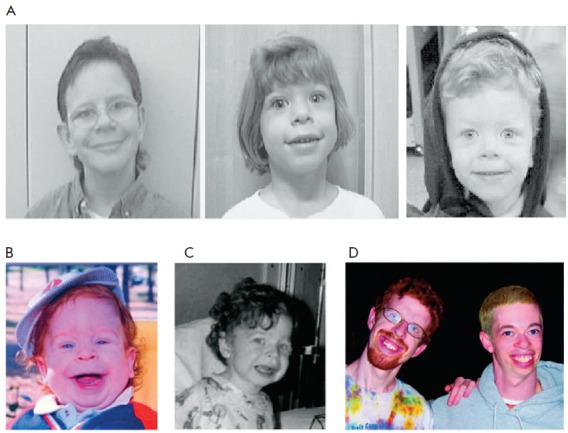
Several people with the characteristic facial features of Williams Syndrome.

The most common symptoms of Williams syndrome are heart defects and unusual facial features. Other symptoms include failure to gain weight appropriately in infancy and low muscle tone. People with WS tend to have widely spaced teeth, a long philtrum, and a flattened nasal bridge. Microcephaly is present in one-third of affected individuals.

Most people with WS are highly verbal relative to their intelligence, and are often very sociable, having what has been described as a "cocktail party"-type personality. People with Williams syndrome hyperfocus on the eyes of others in social engagements.

=== Physical ===
People with Williams syndrome experience many cardiac problems, commonly heart murmurs and the narrowing of major blood vessels, as well as supravalvular aortic stenosis. Other symptoms may include gastrointestinal problems, such as severe or prolonged colic, abdominal pain and diverticulitis, nocturnal enuresis (bed wetting) and urinary difficulties, dental irregularities and defective tooth enamel, and hormone problems, the most common being hypercalcemia. Hypothyroidism has been reported to occur in children, although no proof has been found of it occurring in adults; adults with WS have a higher risk of developing type 2 diabetes, with some cases apparent as young as 21 years old.

People with WS often have hyperacusia and phonophobia, which resembles noise-induced hearing loss; however, this may be due to a malfunctioning auditory nerve. People with WS also tend to demonstrate a love of music, and they appear significantly more likely to possess absolute pitch. Also, higher prevalences of left-handedness and left-eye dominance seem to occur.

Ophthalmologic issues are common among people with WS. Up to 75% of subjects in some studies have strabismus (ocular misalignment), particularly esotropia, due to inherent subnormal binocular visual function and cognitive deficits in visuospatial construction. People with WS have problems with visual processing, but this is related to difficulty in dealing with complex spatial relationships rather than depth perception per se.

=== Nervous system ===
Because of missing multiple genes, many effects on the brain are seen, including abnormalities in the cerebellum, right parietal lobe, and left frontal cortical regions. This pattern is consistent with the visual-spatial disabilities and problems with behavioral timing often seen in WS.

Frontal-cerebellar pathways, involved in behavioral timing, are often abnormally developed in people with WS, which may be related to their deficits in coordination and execution of fine motor tasks such as drawing and writing. In addition, people with WS often exhibit gross motor difficulties, including trouble walking downstairs, overactive motor reflexes (hyperreflexia), and hyperactive, involuntary movement of the eyes (nystagmus).

Williams syndrome is also noteworthy for exhibiting abnormalities in the parietal-dorsal areas of the neocortex, but not the ventral areas. The parietal-dorsal area handles visual processing that supports visual-spatial analysis of the environment, while the ventral is related to semantic recognition of visual stimuli, and the recognition of faces. Thus, people with WS are often able to visually identify and recognize whole objects, and refer to them by name, but struggle with visuospatial construction (seeing an object as being composed of many smaller parts, and recreating it) and orienting themselves in space.

People with WS are often affable and hyperverbal, demonstrating the decreased inhibition ability that stems from dorsal-frontal deficits. Some studies suggest that the amygdala of a person with Williams syndrome has greater volume than the average person's (though it is smaller than average in childhood). In general, neuroimaging studies demonstrate that people with WS have diminished amygdala reactivity in response to socially frightening stimuli (such as disapproving faces), but demonstrate hyperreactivity in the amygdala when presented with nonsocial fear stimuli (such as frightening animals). This may partially account for the apparent absence of social inhibition observed in people with the syndrome, as well as the prevalence of anxious symptoms (but see fear for details on the relationship between the amygdala and fear response). Also, some evidence indicates that people with WS exhibit amygdalal hyperactivity when viewing happy facial expressions. They are talkative and eager to please.

Increased volume and activation of the left auditory cortex has been observed in people with WS, which has been interpreted as a neural correlation of patients' rhythm propensity and fondness of music. Similar sizes of the auditory cortex have been previously reported only in professional musicians.

=== Development ===
The earliest observable symptoms of Williams syndrome include low birth weight, failure to thrive, breastfeeding difficulties, nocturnal irritability, and gastroesophageal reflux. Facial dysmorphies thought to be characteristic of the syndrome are also present early in development, as are heart murmurs. Research on the development of the syndrome suggests that congenital heart disease is typically present at an early age, often at the infant's first pediatric appointment. Heart problems in infancy often lead to the initial diagnosis of WS.

Developmental delays are present in most cases of WS, and include delay of language abilities and delayed motor-skill development. People with WS develop language abilities quite late relative to other children, with the child's first word often occurring as late as 3 years of age. Language abilities are often observed to be deficient until adolescence, in terms of semantics, morphology, and phonology, though not in vocabulary.

Williams syndrome is also marked by a delay in the development of motor skills. Infants with WS develop the ability to lift their heads and sit without support months later than typically developing children. These delays continue into childhood, where patients with WS are delayed in learning to walk. In young children, the observed motor delay is around 5–6 months, though some research suggests that children with WS have a delay in development that becomes more extreme with age. Children with motor delays as a result of WS are particularly behind in the development of coordination, fine motor skills such as writing and drawing, response time, and strength and dexterity of the arms. Impaired motor ability persists (and possibly worsens) as children with WS reach adolescence.

Adults and adolescents with Williams syndrome typically achieve a below-average height and weight, compared with unaffected populations. As people with WS age, they frequently develop joint limitations and hypertonia, or abnormally increased muscle tone. Hypertension, gastrointestinal problems, and genitourinary symptoms often persist into adulthood, as well as cardiovascular problems. Adults are typically limited in their ability to live independently or work in competitive employment settings, but this developmental impairment is attributed more to psychological symptoms than physiological problems.

=== Social and psychological ===
People with Williams syndrome report higher anxiety levels as well as phobia development, which may be associated with hyperacusis (high sensitivity to certain frequencies of sound). Compared with other children with delays, those with Williams syndrome display a significantly greater number of fears. 35% of these children met the DSM definition of having a phobia as compared with 1–4.3% for those with other types of developmental delays. Williams syndrome is also strongly associated with attention deficit hyperactivity disorder (ADHD) and related psychological symptoms such as poor concentration, hyperactivity, and social disinhibition.

Furthermore, cognitive abilities (IQs) of people with WMS typically range from mild to moderate levels of intellectual disability. One study of 306 children with Williams syndrome found IQ scores ranging from 40 to 112 with a mean of 69.32 (the mean IQ score of the general population is 100). IQ scores above this range have been reported in people with smaller genetic deletions. In particular, people with Williams syndrome experience challenges in visual-motor skills and visuospatial construction. Most affected people are unable to spatially orient themselves and many experience difficulty when given a task that requires even the most basic visual problem-solving. Many adults with Williams syndrome cannot complete a simple six-piece puzzle designed for young children, for example. These visuospatial deficits may be related to damage to the dorsal cortical pathway for visual processing.

Despite their physical and cognitive deficits, people with Williams syndrome exhibit impressive social and verbal abilities. WS patients can be highly verbal relative to their IQ. When children with Williams syndrome are asked to name an array of animals, they may well list a wild assortment of creatures such as a koala, saber-toothed cat, vulture, unicorn, sea lion, yak, ibex and Brontosaurus, a far greater verbal array than would be expected of children with IQs in the 60s. Some other strengths that have been associated with Williams syndrome are auditory short-term memory and facial recognition skills. The language used by people with Williams syndrome differs notably from unaffected populations, including people matched for IQ. People with Williams syndrome tend to use speech that is rich in emotional descriptors, high in prosody (exaggerated rhythm and emotional intensity), and features unusual terms and strange idioms.

Among the hallmark traits of people with Williams syndrome is an apparent lack of social inhibition. Dykens and Rosner (1999) found that 100% of those with Williams syndrome were kind-spirited, 90% sought the company of others, 87% empathize with others' pain, 84% are caring, 83% are unselfish/forgiving, 75% never go unnoticed in a group, and 75% are happy when others do well. Infants with Williams syndrome make normal and frequent eye contact, and young children with Williams will often approach and hug strangers. People affected by Williams syndrome typically have high empathy, showing relative strength in reading people's eyes to gauge intentions, emotions, and mental states. The level of friendliness observed in people with Williams is often inappropriate for the social setting, however, and teens and adults with Williams syndrome often experience social isolation, frustration, and loneliness despite their clear desire to connect to other people.

While these children often come off as happy due to their sociable nature, often there are internal drawbacks to the way they act. 76–86% of these children were reported as believing that they either had few friends or problems with their friends. This is possibly due to the fact that although they are very friendly to strangers and love meeting new people, they may have trouble interacting on a deeper level. 73–93% were reported as unreserved with strangers, 67% highly sensitive to rejection, 65% susceptible to teasing, and the statistic for exploitation and abuse was unavailable. There are external problems as well. 91–96% demonstrate inattention, 75% impulsivity, 59–71% hyperactivity, 46–74% tantrums, 32–60% disobedience, and 25–37% fighting and aggressive behavior.

In one experiment, a group of children with Williams syndrome showed no signs of racial bias, unlike children without the syndrome. They did show gender bias, however, to a similar degree to children without the syndrome.

== Cause ==
Williams syndrome genes

- ASL
- BAZ1B
- BCL7B
- CLDN3
- CLDN4
- CLIP2
- EIF4H
- ELN
- FZD9
- FKBP6
- GTF2I
- GTF2IRD1
- HIP1
- KCTD7
- LAT2
- LIMK1
- MDH2
- NCF1
- NSUN5
- POR
- RFC2
- STX1A
- TBL2
- TRIM50
- TRIM73
- TRIM74
- WBSCR14
- WBSCR18
- WBSCR21
- WBSCR22
- WBSCR23
- WBSCR24
- WBSCR27
- WBSCR28

Williams syndrome is a microdeletion syndrome caused by the spontaneous deletion of genetic material from the chromosomal region 7q11.23. This is a heterozygous deletion, which results in haploinsufficient expression of the 25–27 genes in this region. CLIP2, ELN, GTF2I, GTF2IRD1, and LIMK1 are among the genes typically deleted. Haploinsufficiency for the ELN gene, which codes for the extracellular matrix protein elastin, is associated with connective-tissue abnormalities and cardiovascular disease (specifically supravalvular aortic stenosis and supravalvular pulmonary stenosis). Elastin insufficiency may also contribute to distinct faces, harsh or hoarse voice, hernias, and bladder diverticula often found in those with Williams syndrome. Haploinsufficiency in LIMK1, GTF2I, GTF2IRD1, and perhaps other genes may help explain the characteristic difficulties with visual–spatial tasks. Additionally, some evidence shows that haploinsufficiency in several of these genes, including CLIP2, may contribute to the unique behavioral characteristics, learning disabilities, and other cognitive difficulties seen in WS.

== Diagnosis ==
According to the Williams Syndrome Association, its diagnosis begins with the recognition of physical symptoms and markers, which is followed by a confirmatory genetic test. The physical signs that often indicate a suspected case of WS include puffiness around the eyes, a long philtrum, and a stellate pattern in the iris. Physiological symptoms that often contribute to a WS diagnosis are cardiovascular problems, particularly aortic or pulmonary stenosis, and feeding disturbance in infants. Developmental delays are often taken as an initial sign of the syndrome, as well.

If a physician suspects a case of WS, the diagnosis is confirmed using one of two possible genetic tests: Micro-array analysis or the fluorescent in situ hybridization test, which examines chromosome 7 and probes for the existence of two copies of the elastin gene. Since 98-99% of individuals with WS lack half of the 7q11.23 region of chromosome 7, where the elastin gene is located, the presence of only one copy of the gene is a strong sign of WS. This confirmatory genetic test has been validated in epidemiological studies and has been demonstrated to be a more effective method of identifying WS than previous methods, which often relied on the presence of cardiovascular problems and facial features (which, while common, are not always present).

Reliance on facial features to identify WS may cause a misdiagnosis of the condition. Among the more reliable features suggestive of WS are congenital heart disease, periorbital fullness ("puffy" eyes), and the presence of a long, smooth philtrum. Less reliable signs of the syndrome include anteverted nostrils, a wide mouth, and an elongated neck. Even with significant clinical experience, reliably identifying Williams syndrome based on facial features alone is difficult. This is particularly the case in individuals of non-white backgrounds, where typical WS facial features (such as full lips) are more prevalent.

== Treatment ==
No cure for Williams syndrome has been found. Suggested treatments include avoidance of extra calcium and vitamin D, and treating high levels of blood calcium. Blood-vessel narrowing can be a significant health problem and is treated on an individual basis. Physical therapy is helpful to patients with joint stiffness and low muscle tone. Developmental and speech therapy can also help children and increase the success of their social interactions. Other treatments are based on a patient's particular symptoms.

The American Academy of Pediatrics recommends annual cardiology evaluations for individuals with WS. Other recommended assessments include ophthalmologic evaluations, an examination for inguinal hernia, objective hearing assessment, blood-pressure measurement, developmental and growth evaluation, orthopedic assessments on joints and muscle tone, and ongoing feeding and dietary assessments to manage constipation and urinary problems.

Behavioral treatments have been shown to be effective. In regard to social skills, it may be effective to channel their nature by teaching basic skills. Some of these are the appropriate way to approach someone, how and when to socialize in settings such as school or the workplace, and warning of the signs and dangers of exploitation. For phobias, cognitive-behavioral approaches, such as therapy, are the recommended treatments. One of the things to be careful of with this approach is to make sure that the patients' "charming" nature does not mask any underlying feelings.Perhaps the most effective treatment for those with WS is music. Those affected have shown relative strength in regards to music, albeit only in pitch and rhythm tasks. Not only do they show strength in the field, but also a particular fondness for it. Music may help with the internal and external anxiety with which these people are more likely to be afflicted. Notably, the typical person processes music in the superior temporal and temporal gyri. Those with WS have reduced activation in these areas, but an increase in the right amygdala and cerebellum.

People affected by WS are supported by multiple organizations, including the Canadian Association for Williams Syndrome and the Williams Syndrome Registry.

== Epidemiology ==
Williams syndrome has historically been estimated to occur in roughly one in every 20,000 live births, but more recent epidemiological studies have placed the occurrence rate at closer to one in every 7,500 live births, a significantly larger prevalence. As increasing evidence suggests WS is more common than originally noted (about 6% of all genetic cases of developmental disability), researchers have begun to hypothesize a previous underdiagnosis of the syndrome. One suggested factor in the increase in epidemiological prevalence estimates is that a substantial minority of individuals with the genetic markers of WS lack the characteristic facial features or the diminished intelligence considered to be diagnostic of the syndrome, and often are not immediately recognized as having the syndrome.

== History ==
Williams syndrome was first described by J. C. P. Williams and his colleagues, who wrote in 1961 of four patients with supravalvular aortic stenosis, mental disability, and facial features including a broad forehead, large chin, low-set, "drooping" cheeks, widely spaced eyes, and wide-set mouth. A year after this report, German physician A. J. Beuren described three new patients with the same presentation. This led to the syndrome's full original name, Williams–Beuren syndrome, which is still used in some medical publications. From 1964 to 1975, small research reports broadened medical knowledge of this syndrome's cardiovascular problems. Then in 1975, K. Jones and D. Smith produced a large-scale report on numerous patients with WS, ranging in age from infancy to adulthood, and described the behavioral and observable physical symptoms in greater detail than previously recorded.

== Society and culture ==
The adjective "elfin" may have originated to describe the facial features of people with WS; before its scientific cause was understood, people believed that individuals with the syndrome, who have exceptionally charming and kind personalities, had extraordinary, even magical, powers. This has been conjecturally proposed to be the origin of the folklore of elves, fairies, and other forms of the 'good people' or 'wee folk' present in English folklore.

In a review of the symptoms and features of the syndrome, Laskari, Smith, and Graham emphasized that many family members of individuals with WS reject use of terminology such as "elfin", as well as descriptions of social symptoms as "cocktail party syndrome". Physicians, family members of individuals with WS syndrome, and WS associations alike have called for the curtailment of such terms.

One notable person with the syndrome is Gabrielle Marion-Rivard, a Canadian actress and singer who won the Canadian Screen Award for Best Actress in 2014 for her performance in the film Gabrielle. Another is Jeremy Vest, member of the How's Your News? team, featured in the US-based TV series and film of the same name.

== See also ==
- List of syndromes
- Characteristics of syndromic ASD conditions
