= CLDN15 =

Protein-coding gene in humans

Identifiers
- Aliases: CLDN15, claudin 15
- External IDs: OMIM: 615778; MGI: 1913103; GeneCards: CLDN15
Available structures
PDB	Ortholog search: PDBe RCSB
PDB	List of PDB id codes 4P79

Gene location (Human)
Chr.	Chromosome 7 (human)
Band	7q22.1	Start	101,232,092 bp
Band	7q22.1	End	101,238,820 bp

Gene location (Mouse)
Chr.	Chromosome 5 (mouse)
Band	5|5 G2	Start	136,995,470 bp
Band	5|5 G2	End	137,004,712 bp
RNA expression pattern
Bgee	Human / Mouse (ortholog); Top expressed in: jejunal mucosa; duodenum; mucosa of ileum; germinal epithelium; mucosa of transverse colon; granulocyte; parietal pleura; right lobe of liver; left uterine tube; spleen / Top expressed in: duodenum; crypt of lieberkuhn of small intestine; intestinal villus; granulocyte; jejunum; Paneth cell; epithelium of small intestine; ileum; left colon; oocyte; More reference expression data
BioGPS	n/a
Gene ontology
Molecular function	structural molecule activity; identical protein binding
Cellular component	integral component of membrane; cell junction; plasma membrane; lateral plasma membrane; membrane; bicellular tight junction
Biological process	calcium-independent cell-cell adhesion via plasma membrane cell-adhesion molecules; ion transport
Sources:Amigo / QuickGO
Orthologs
Databases	NCBI: entry; OMA: entry
Species	Human	Mouse
Entrez	24146	60363
Ensembl	ENSG00000106404	ENSMUSG00000001739
UniProt	P56746	Q9Z0S5
RefSeq (mRNA)	NM_138429; NM_001185080; NM_014343	NM_021719
RefSeq (protein)	NP_001172009; NP_055158	NP_068365
Location (UCSC)	Chr 7: 101.23 – 101.24 Mb	Chr 5: 137 – 137 Mb
PubMed search
- Wikidata
View/Edit Human	View/Edit Mouse

Claudin-15 is a protein that in humans is encoded by the CLDN15 gene. It belongs to the group of claudins. Among its related pathways are Blood-Brain Barrier and Immune Cell Transmigration: VCAM-1/CD106 Signaling Pathways and Tight junction. GO annotations related to this gene include identical protein binding and structural molecule activity. An important paralog of this gene is CLDN10.
