= NSUN5 =

Protein-coding gene in the species Homo sapiens

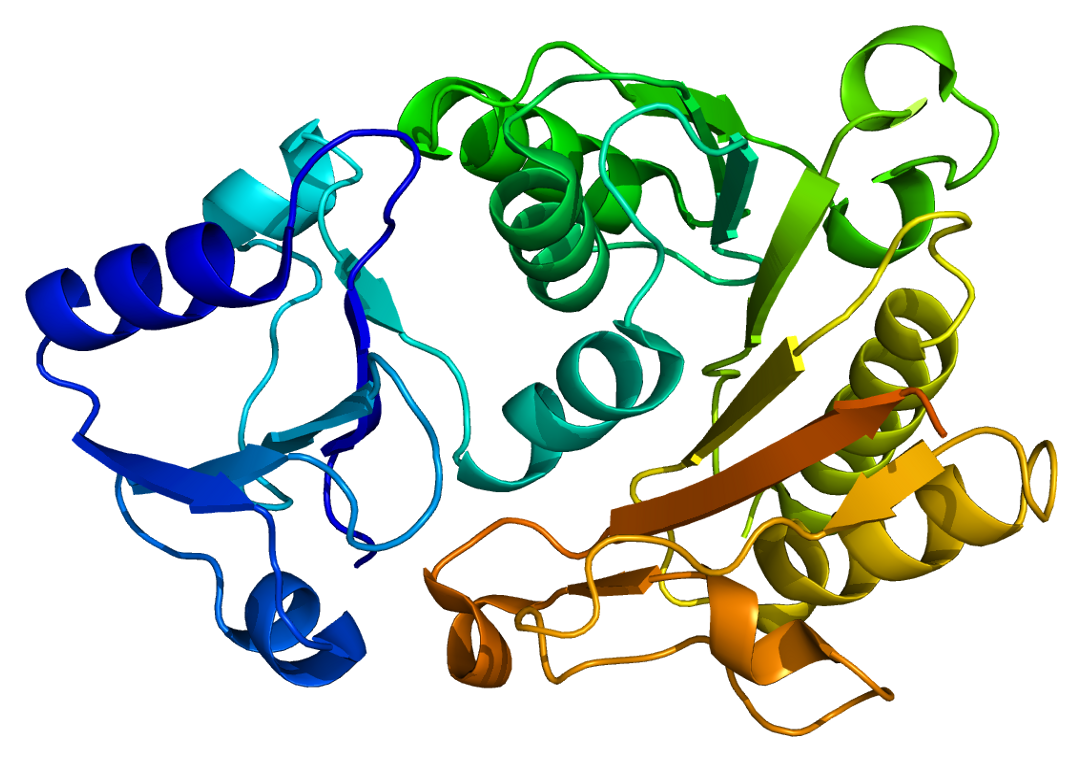

Identifiers
- Aliases: NSUN5, NOL1, NOL1R, NSUN5A, WBSCR20, WBSCR20A, p120, p120(NOL1), NOP2/Sun RNA methyltransferase family member 5, NOP2/Sun RNA methyltransferase 5
- External IDs: OMIM: 615732; MGI: 2140844; GeneCards: NSUN5
Available structures
PDB	Ortholog search: PDBe RCSB
PDB	List of PDB id codes 2B9E

Gene location (Human)
Chr.	Chromosome 7 (human)
Band	7q11.23	Start	73,302,516 bp
Band	7q11.23	End	73,308,826 bp

Gene location (Mouse)
Chr.	Chromosome 5 (mouse)
Band	5|5 G2	Start	135,398,807 bp
Band	5|5 G2	End	135,405,659 bp
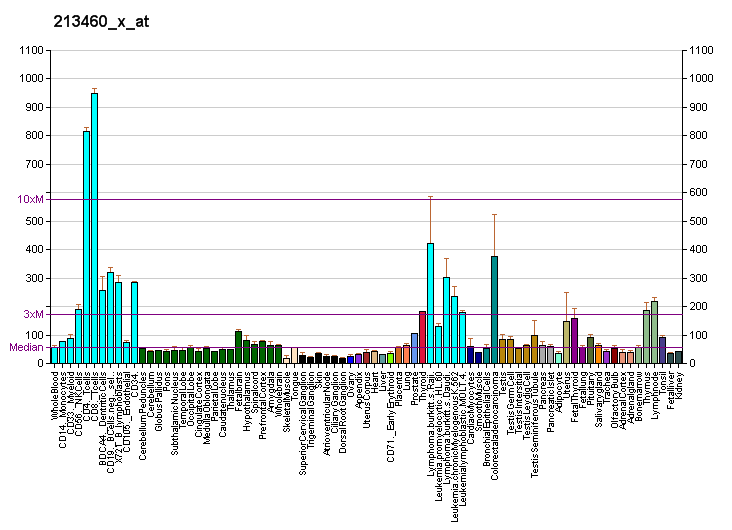

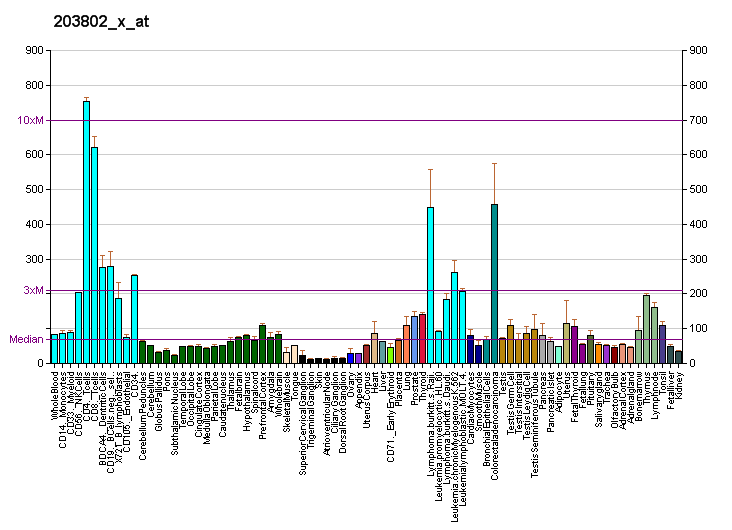

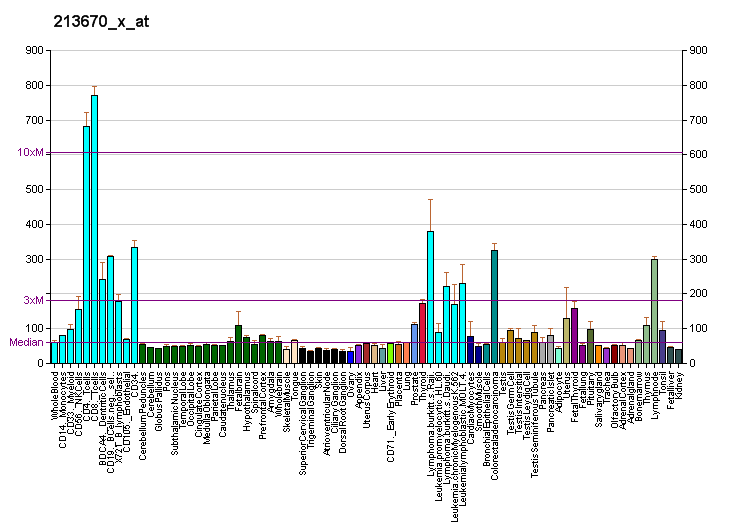
RNA expression pattern
Bgee	Human / Mouse (ortholog); Top expressed in: granulocyte; blood; mucosa of transverse colon; gastrocnemius muscle; bone marrow; spleen; muscle of thigh; apex of heart; gonad; bone marrow cell / Top expressed in: interventricular septum; yolk sac; ascending aorta; lens placode; embryo; aortic valve; epiblast; embryo; morula; tail of embryo; More reference expression data
BioGPS	More reference expression data
Gene ontology
Molecular function	methyltransferase activity; transferase activity; S-adenosylmethionine-dependent methyltransferase activity; RNA methyltransferase activity; RNA binding
Cellular component	nucleus; nucleolus
Biological process	rRNA processing; methylation; rRNA base methylation
Sources:Amigo / QuickGO
Orthologs
Databases	NCBI: entry; OMA: entry
Species	Human	Mouse
Entrez	55695	100609
Ensembl	ENSG00000130305	ENSMUSG00000000916
UniProt	Q96P11	Q8K4F6
RefSeq (mRNA)	NM_001168347; NM_001168348; NM_018044; NM_148956	NM_145414; NM_001359617
RefSeq (protein)	NP_001161819; NP_001161820; NP_060514; NP_683759	NP_663389; NP_001346546
Location (UCSC)	Chr 7: 73.3 – 73.31 Mb	Chr 5: 135.4 – 135.41 Mb
PubMed search
- Wikidata
View/Edit Human	View/Edit Mouse

Putative methyltransferase NSUN5 is an enzyme that in humans is encoded by the NSUN5 gene.

This gene encodes a protein with similarity to p120 (NOL1), a 120-kDa proliferation-associated nucleolar antigen that is a member of an evolutionarily conserved protein family. This gene is deleted in Williams syndrome, a multisystem developmental disorder caused by the deletion of contiguous genes at 7q11.23. Alternative splicing of this gene results in two transcript variants encoding different isoforms.
