= J. C. P. Williams =

New Zealand cardiologist

John Cyprian Phipps Williams (born 16 November 1922 – disappeared c. 1980, declared dead 1988) was a New Zealand cardiologist known for discovering, in 1961, what is now called Williams syndrome.

== Education and early career ==
Born in Wellington, New Zealand, Williams graduated in 1945 with a Bachelor of Science from Victoria University of Wellington, followed by a Bachelor of Arts from the same institution in 1947. He studied medicine at the Otago Medical School in Dunedin and graduated in 1953.

He worked as a house surgeon at the Auckland Hospital from 1954 to 1955, and after a period at the Thames Hospital, he worked from 1956 to 1962 at the Auckland Hospital and Green Lane Hospital. In 1961, while working as a registrar, he published his paper on the syndrome that was to bear his name. He had noted a grouping of young patients who were short in stature, with elfin facial features, cardiac problems and cognitive deficits, as well as being very sociable. He was appointed a consultant in cardiology at Green Lane Hospital in 1963.

Williams had a reputation for being erratic and eccentric, and his life has been subject to various claims and conspiracy theories. Despite suggestions that Williams had disappeared while on his way to take up a position at the Mayo Clinic in Rochester, Minnesota, he worked there from October 1962 to September 1965 as a postdoctoral fellow in the cardiovascular physiology laboratory with the physiologist Earl Wood. His colleagues there later described him as a private person with some odd behaviours. None recalled his mentioning Williams syndrome, and he did not continue research in the area. After the end of his fellowship, Williams worked as a consultant with Wood until September 1966. He continued to be associated with the Mayo Clinic after moving to the United Kingdom, where he worked with the physiologist Andrew Huxley at University College, London, from October 1966 to October 1968.

== Later life and disappearance ==
Williams had many interests, including music and literature. While in London in 1967, he met the New Zealand poet Janet Frame, who was a friend of a friend. Shortly afterwards Frame became ill with viral meningitis, and after a hospitalisation she accepted an invitation to stay with Williams while she recovered. They developed some intimacy, and she later wrote that she "enjoyed his company immensely, and admired him greatly...[He] gets top marks from me for 'livability-with.'" On a subsequent visit to the UK in 1969, Frame stayed with Williams again, using his flat as a base in London. During her visit, Williams proposed marriage to Frame, asking, "Why don't we formalize our relationship?" Frame fled, not expecting or wanting marriage. When she returned to London about a week later, Williams had disappeared, and little is known of his later movements.

Friends and colleagues met Williams in Europe, with the last meetings occurring in the mid 1970s in Salzburg, Austria. In 1972, he accepted and then later declined a post at the Latter Day Saints Hospital in Salt Lake City, Utah, United States. Williams renewed his passport in Geneva in September 1979. At the behest of his sister, Interpol tried and failed to find him, and in 1988 Williams was declared "a missing person presumed to be dead from 1978" by the High Court of New Zealand. However, author Michael King reports that Williams contacted him indirectly in January 2000, asking that he not be "discussed" in King's biography of Janet Frame.

== See also ==
- Lists of people who disappeared
