= CLDN22 =

Protein-coding gene in humans

Identifiers
- Aliases: CLDN22, CLDN21, claudin 22
- External IDs: MGI: 1922927; GeneCards: CLDN22

Gene location (Human)
Chr.	Chromosome 4 (human)
Band	4q35.1	Start	183,318,100 bp
Band	4q35.1	End	183,320,276 bp

Gene location (Mouse)
Chr.	Chromosome 8 (mouse)
Band	8|8 B1.1	Start	48,277,517 bp
Band	8|8 B1.1	End	48,278,511 bp
RNA expression pattern
Bgee	Human / Mouse (ortholog); Top expressed in: testicle; olfactory zone of nasal mucosa; minor salivary glands; gonad; granulocyte; right lobe of liver; apex of heart; primary visual cortex; endometrium; ventricular zone / Top expressed in: parotid gland; sciatic nerve; otolith organ; utricle; lacrimal gland; vestibular sensory epithelium; blastocyst; morula; lumbar spinal ganglion; vestibular membrane of cochlear duct; More reference expression data
BioGPS	n/a
Gene ontology
Molecular function	structural molecule activity; identical protein binding
Cellular component	plasma membrane; integral component of membrane; cell junction; membrane; bicellular tight junction
Biological process	calcium-independent cell-cell adhesion via plasma membrane cell-adhesion molecules
Sources:Amigo / QuickGO
Orthologs
Databases	NCBI: entry; OMA: entry
Species	Human	Mouse
Entrez	53842	75677
Ensembl	ENSG00000177300	ENSMUSG00000038064
UniProt	Q8N7P3	Q9D7U6
RefSeq (mRNA)	NM_001111319	NM_029383
RefSeq (protein)	NP_001104789	NP_083659
Location (UCSC)	Chr 4: 183.32 – 183.32 Mb	Chr 8: 48.28 – 48.28 Mb
PubMed search
- Wikidata
View/Edit Human	View/Edit Mouse

Claudin-22 is a protein that in humans is encoded by the CLDN22 gene. It belongs to the group of claudins.
