= Neonatal ichthyosis–sclerosing cholangitis syndrome =

- Other names: NISCH syndrome
- This condition is inherited in an autosomal recessive manner.
- Specialty: Dermatology

Neonatal ichthyosis–sclerosing cholangitis syndrome (also known as "NISCH syndrome" and "ichthyosis–sclerosing cholangitis syndrome") is a cutaneous condition which is characterized by hypotrichosis of the scalp, alopecia, ichthyosis and sclerosing cholangitis. Only 5 cases from 3 families worldwide have been described in medical literature. It caused by mutations in the Claudin 1 gene.

== See also ==
- Ichthyosis prematurity syndrome
- List of cutaneous conditions
