= CLDN1 =

Protein-coding gene in humans

Identifiers
- Aliases: CLDN1, CLD1, ILVASC, SEMP1, claudin 1
- External IDs: OMIM: 603718; MGI: 1276109; GeneCards: CLDN1

Gene location (Human)
| Chr. | Chromosome 3 (human) |
| Band | 3q28 | Start | 190,305,707 bp |
| Band | 3q28 | End | 190,322,446 bp |

Gene location (Mouse)
| Chr. | Chromosome 16 (mouse) |
| Band | 16|16 B2 | Start | 26,175,392 bp |
| Band | 16|16 B2 | End | 26,190,591 bp |
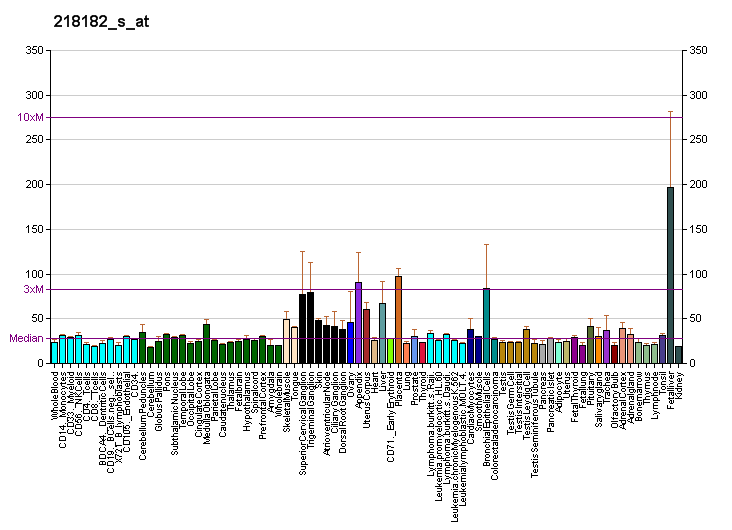
RNA expression pattern
| Bgee | Human / Mouse (ortholog); Top expressed in: skin of thigh; germinal epithelium; skin of hip; skin of abdomen; olfactory zone of nasal mucosa; epithelium of nasopharynx; left uterine tube; right lobe of liver; nipple; gingival epithelium / Top expressed in: retinal pigment epithelium; decidua; molar; skin of external ear; lip; Epithelium of choroid plexus; epidermis; hair follicle; skin of abdomen; lumbar spinal ganglion; More reference expression data |
| BioGPS | More reference expression data |
Gene ontology
| Molecular function | protein binding; structural molecule activity; identical protein binding; virus receptor activity |
| Cellular component | membrane; integral component of membrane; cell junction; plasma membrane; integral component of plasma membrane; apical plasma membrane; lateral plasma membrane; bicellular tight junction; cytoplasm; basolateral plasma membrane |
| Biological process | viral entry into host cell; cell-cell junction organization; calcium-independent cell-cell adhesion via plasma membrane cell-adhesion molecules; viral process; protein homooligomerization; protein heterooligomerization; establishment of skin barrier; bicellular tight junction assembly; ageing; establishment of blood-nerve barrier; response to toxic substance; response to lipopolysaccharide; hyperosmotic salinity response; response to ethanol; xenobiotic transport across blood-nerve barrier; response to interleukin-18; cellular response to lead ion; cellular response to interferon-gamma; cellular response to tumor necrosis factor; response to dexamethasone; cellular response to transforming growth factor beta stimulus; establishment of endothelial intestinal barrier; liver regeneration; positive regulation of bicellular tight junction assembly; cellular response to butyrate |
Sources:Amigo / QuickGO
Orthologs
| Databases | NCBI: entry; OMA: entry |
| Species | Human | Mouse |
| Entrez | 9076 | 12737 |
| Ensembl | ENSG00000163347 | ENSMUSG00000022512 |
| UniProt | O95832 | O88551 |
| RefSeq (mRNA) | NM_021101 | NM_016674 |
| RefSeq (protein) | NP_066924 | NP_057883 |
| Location (UCSC) | Chr 3: 190.31 – 190.32 Mb | Chr 16: 26.18 – 26.19 Mb |
| PubMed search |
- Wikidata
| View/Edit Human | View/Edit Mouse |

Claudin-1 is a protein that in humans is encoded by the CLDN1 gene. It belongs to the group of claudins.

== Function ==
Tight junctions represent one mode of cell-to-cell adhesion in epithelial or endothelial cell sheets, forming continuous seals around cells and serving as a physical barrier to prevent solutes and water from passing freely through the paracellular space. These junctions are composed of sets of continuous networking strands in the outwardly facing cytoplasmic leaflet, with complementary grooves in the inwardly facing extracytoplasmic leaflet. The protein encoded by this gene, a member of the claudin family, is an integral membrane protein and a component of tight junction strands. Loss of function mutations result in neonatal ichthyosis-sclerosing cholangitis syndrome.

== Interactions ==
CLDN1 has been shown to interact with CLDN5 and CLDN3.
