= BUD23 =

Protein-coding gene in humans

Identifiers
- Aliases: BUD23, HASJ4442, HUSSY-3, MERM1, PP3381, WBMT, WBSCR22, Williams-Beuren syndrome chromosome region 22, rRNA methyltransferase and ribosome maturation factor, BUD23 rRNA methyltransferase and ribosome maturation factor
- External IDs: OMIM: 615733; MGI: 1913388; GeneCards: BUD23

Gene location (Human)
Chr.	Chromosome 7 (human)
Band	7q11.23	Start	73,683,025 bp
Band	7q11.23	End	73,705,161 bp

Gene location (Mouse)
Chr.	Chromosome 5 (mouse)
Band	5|5 G2	Start	135,081,811 bp
Band	5|5 G2	End	135,093,813 bp
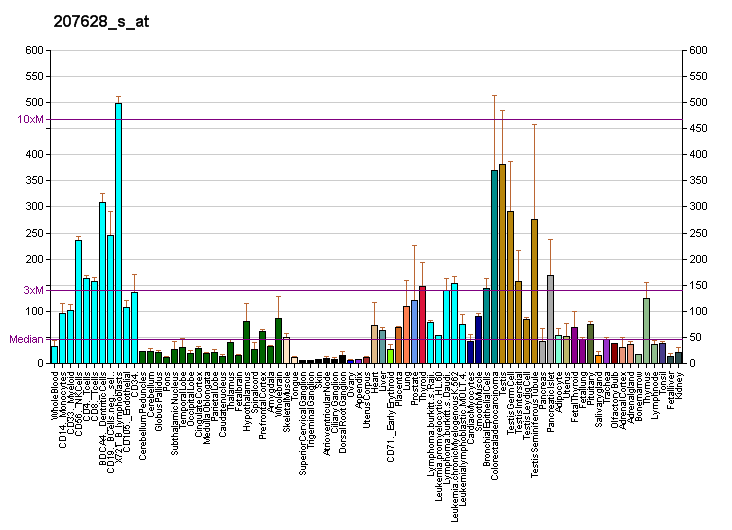
RNA expression pattern
Bgee	Human / Mouse (ortholog); Top expressed in: right testis; left testis; islet of Langerhans; olfactory zone of nasal mucosa; gastrocnemius muscle; apex of heart; oocyte; right uterine tube; left ventricle; muscle of thigh / Top expressed in: epiblast; embryo; embryo; ventricular zone; neural layer of retina; neural tube; ileum; limb; morula; mesencephalon; More reference expression data
BioGPS	More reference expression data
Gene ontology
Molecular function	methyltransferase activity; transferase activity; RNA binding; protein heterodimerization activity; rRNA (guanine) methyltransferase activity
Cellular component	cytoplasm; nucleus; nucleoplasm; nucleolus; perinuclear region of cytoplasm
Biological process	rRNA processing; methylation; metabolism; regulation of transcription, DNA-templated; ribosome biogenesis; transcription, DNA-templated; rRNA methylation; positive regulation of rRNA processing; rRNA (guanine-N7)-methylation; chromatin organization
Sources:Amigo / QuickGO
Orthologs
Databases	NCBI: entry; OMA: entry
Species	Human	Mouse
Entrez	114049	66138
Ensembl	ENSG00000071462	ENSMUSG00000005378
UniProt	O43709	Q9CY21
RefSeq (mRNA)	NM_001202560; NM_017528	NM_025375; NM_001363324; NM_001363325; NM_001363326; NM_001363327
RefSeq (protein)	NP_001189489; NP_059998	NP_079651; NP_001350253; NP_001350254; NP_001350255; NP_001350256
Location (UCSC)	Chr 7: 73.68 – 73.71 Mb	Chr 5: 135.08 – 135.09 Mb
PubMed search
- Wikidata
View/Edit Human	View/Edit Mouse

18S rRNA (guanine-N(7))-methyltransferase is an enzyme that in humans is encoded by the BUD23 gene (previously WBSCR22). This enzyme is involved in the production of the 40S ribosomal subunit, and is a coactivator for multiple steroid receptors (NR3C1-4).

This gene encodes a protein containing a nuclear localization signal and an S-adenosyl-L-methionine binding motif typical of methyltransferases, suggesting that the encoded protein may act on DNA methylation. This gene is deleted in Williams syndrome, a multisystem developmental disorder caused by the deletion of contiguous genes at 7q11.23.

== Gene symbol ==
This gene is an ortholog of a gene found in baker's yeast whose protein is involved in bud positioning and has been called "Bud site selection protein 23", hence BUD23.
