= CLDN17 =

Protein-coding gene in humans

Identifiers
- Aliases: CLDN17, claudin 17
- External IDs: OMIM: 617005; MGI: 2652030; GeneCards: CLDN17

Gene location (Human)
Chr.	Chromosome 21 (human)
Band	21q21.3	Start	30,165,565 bp
Band	21q21.3	End	30,166,805 bp

Gene location (Mouse)
Chr.	Chromosome 16 (mouse)
Band	16|16 C3.3	Start	88,302,695 bp
Band	16|16 C3.3	End	88,303,866 bp
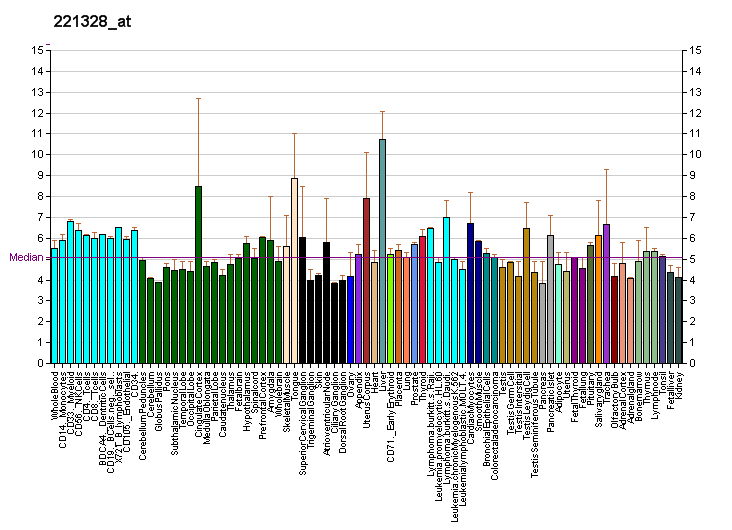
RNA expression pattern
Bgee	Human / Mouse (ortholog); Top expressed in: testicle; cervix epithelium; oral cavity; human penis; epithelium of esophagus; gums; vagina; body of tongue; vulva; gingival epithelium / Top expressed in: esophagus; embryo; ear; surface ectoderm; nose; pharyngeal arch; lip; stomach; zone of skin; visual system; More reference expression data
BioGPS	More reference expression data
Gene ontology
Molecular function	structural molecule activity; identical protein binding; chloride channel activity; protein binding
Cellular component	integral component of membrane; cell junction; plasma membrane; membrane; bicellular tight junction; chloride channel complex
Biological process	calcium-independent cell-cell adhesion via plasma membrane cell-adhesion molecules; ion transport; chloride transport; chloride transmembrane transport; transport
Sources:Amigo / QuickGO
Orthologs
Databases	NCBI: entry; OMA: entry
Species	Human	Mouse
Entrez	26285	239931
Ensembl	ENSG00000156282	ENSMUSG00000055811
UniProt	P56750	Q8BXA6
RefSeq (mRNA)	NM_012131	NM_181490
RefSeq (protein)	NP_036263	NP_852467
Location (UCSC)	Chr 21: 30.17 – 30.17 Mb	Chr 16: 88.3 – 88.3 Mb
PubMed search
- Wikidata
View/Edit Human	View/Edit Mouse

Claudin-17 is a protein that in humans is encoded by the CLDN17 gene. It belongs to the group of claudins; claudins are cell-cell junction proteins that keep that maintains cell- and tissue-barrier function. It forms anion-selective paracellular channels and is localized mainly in kidney proximal tubules.
