= CLDN20 =

Protein-coding gene in humans

Identifiers
- Aliases: CLDN20, claudin 20
- External IDs: MGI: 3646757; GeneCards: CLDN20
Available structures
PDB	Ortholog search: PDBe RCSB
PDB	List of PDB id codes 4YYX

Gene location (Human)
Chr.	Chromosome 6 (human)
Band	6q25.3	Start	155,264,013 bp
Band	6q25.3	End	155,276,548 bp

Gene location (Mouse)
Chr.	Chromosome 17 (mouse)
Band	17|17 A1	Start	3,582,829 bp
Band	17|17 A1	End	3,583,484 bp
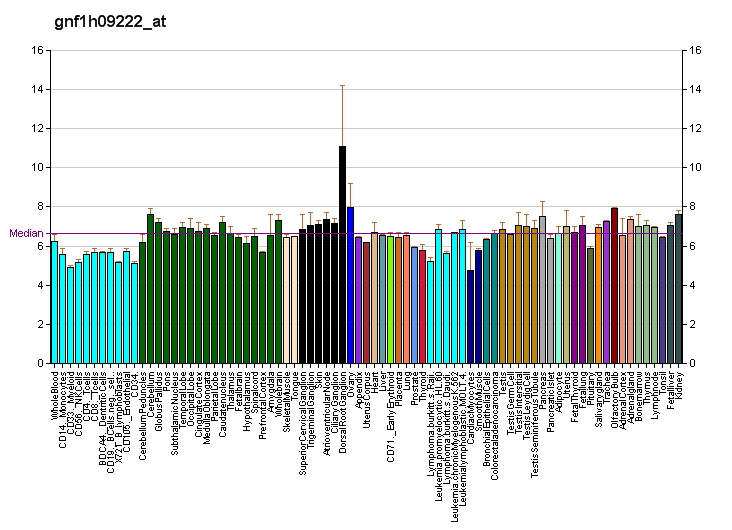
RNA expression pattern
Bgee	Human / Mouse (ortholog); Top expressed in: buccal mucosa cell; testicle; tendon; stromal cell of endometrium; tibial nerve; epithelium of colon; Achilles tendon; right adrenal cortex; left adrenal gland; smooth muscle tissue / Top expressed in: embryo; secondary oocyte; zygote; granulocyte; bone marrow; primary oocyte; ganglionic eminence; olfactory bulb; striatum of neuraxis; neural layer of retina; More reference expression data
BioGPS	More reference expression data
Gene ontology
Molecular function	structural molecule activity; identical protein binding
Cellular component	integral component of membrane; cell junction; plasma membrane; membrane; bicellular tight junction
Biological process	calcium-independent cell-cell adhesion via plasma membrane cell-adhesion molecules
Sources:Amigo / QuickGO
Orthologs
Databases	NCBI: entry; OMA: entry
Species	Human	Mouse
Entrez	49861	621628
Ensembl	ENSG00000171217	ENSMUSG00000091530
UniProt	P56880	G5E8X0
RefSeq (mRNA)	NM_001001346	NM_001101560
RefSeq (protein)	NP_001001346	NP_001095030
Location (UCSC)	Chr 6: 155.26 – 155.28 Mb	Chr 17: 3.58 – 3.58 Mb
PubMed search
- Wikidata
View/Edit Human	View/Edit Mouse

Claudin-20 is a protein that in humans is encoded by the CLDN20 gene. It belongs to the group of claudins.
