= CLDN6 =

Protein-coding gene in humans

Identifiers
- Aliases: CLDN6, claudin 6
- External IDs: OMIM: 615798; MGI: 1859284; GeneCards: CLDN6

Gene location (Human)
Chr.	Chromosome 16 (human)
Band	16p13.3	Start	3,014,712 bp
Band	16p13.3	End	3,020,071 bp

Gene location (Mouse)
Chr.	Chromosome 17 (mouse)
Band	17|17 A3.3	Start	23,898,223 bp
Band	17|17 A3.3	End	23,901,420 bp
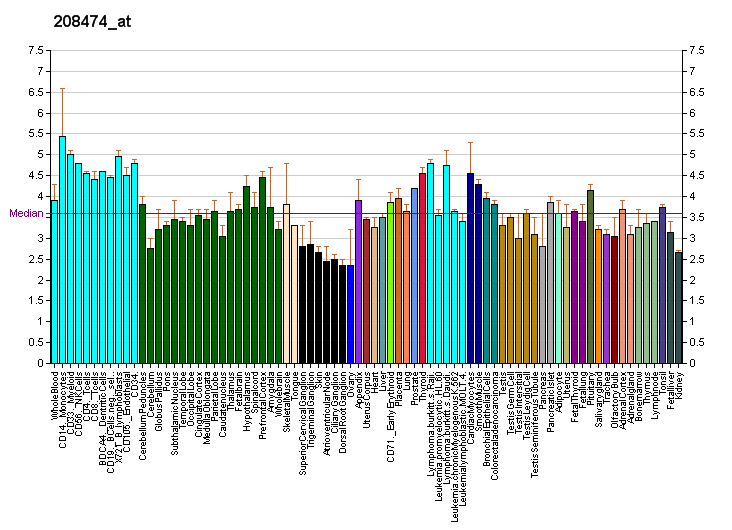
RNA expression pattern
Bgee	Human / Mouse (ortholog); Top expressed in: gonad; islet of Langerhans; putamen; placenta; cerebellar hemisphere; striated muscle tissue; skeletal muscle tissue; right hemisphere of cerebellum; stromal cell of endometrium; metanephros / Top expressed in: yolk sac; embryo; epiblast; genital tubercle; tail of embryo; primitive streak; blastocyst; glomerulus; morula; renal vein; More reference expression data
BioGPS	More reference expression data
Gene ontology
Molecular function	structural molecule activity; identical protein binding; protein binding; virus receptor activity
Cellular component	bicellular tight junction; cell junction; membrane; apicolateral plasma membrane; integral component of membrane; plasma membrane
Biological process	cell-cell junction organization; viral process; calcium-independent cell-cell adhesion via plasma membrane cell-adhesion molecules; viral entry into host cell
Sources:Amigo / QuickGO
Orthologs
Databases	NCBI: entry; OMA: entry
Species	Human	Mouse
Entrez	9074	54419
Ensembl	ENSG00000184697	ENSMUSG00000023906
UniProt	P56747	Q9Z262
RefSeq (mRNA)	NM_021195	NM_018777
RefSeq (protein)	NP_067018	NP_061247
Location (UCSC)	Chr 16: 3.01 – 3.02 Mb	Chr 17: 23.9 – 23.9 Mb
PubMed search
- Wikidata
View/Edit Human	View/Edit Mouse

Claudin-6 is a protein that in humans is encoded by the CLDN6 gene. It belongs to the group of claudins. The knockout mice of mouse homolog exhibit no phenotype, indicating that claudin-6 is dispensable for normal development and homeostasis.
