= CLDN5 =

Protein-coding gene in humans

Identifiers
- Aliases: CLDN5, AWAL, BEC1, CPETRL1, TMVCF, claudin 5, TMDVCF
- External IDs: OMIM: 602101; MGI: 1276112; GeneCards: CLDN5

Gene location (Human)
Chr.	Chromosome 22 (human)
Band	22q11.21	Start	19,523,024 bp
Band	22q11.21	End	19,527,545 bp

Gene location (Mouse)
Chr.	Chromosome 16 (mouse)
Band	16 A3|16 11.63 cM	Start	18,595,597 bp
Band	16 A3|16 11.63 cM	End	18,597,012 bp
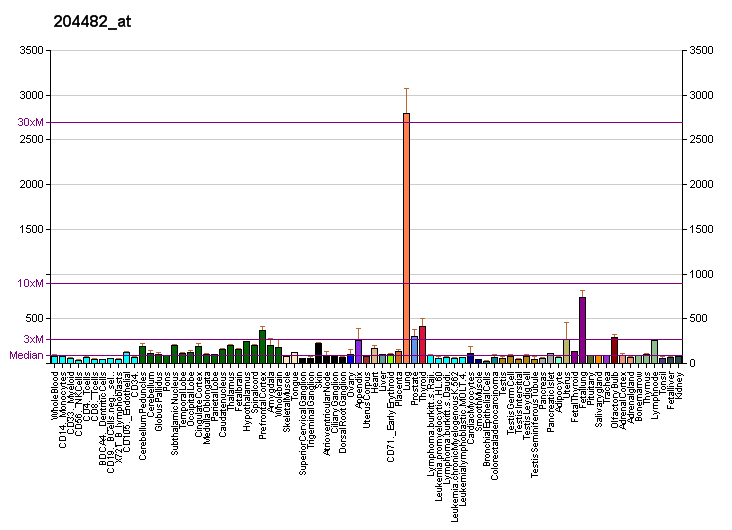
RNA expression pattern
Bgee	Human / Mouse (ortholog); Top expressed in: right lung; upper lobe of lung; upper lobe of left lung; pericardium; lower lobe of lung; subcutaneous adipose tissue; C1 segment; dorsal motor nucleus of vagus nerve; inferior olivary nucleus; olfactory bulb / Top expressed in: right lung; right lung lobe; left lung; external carotid artery; renal corpuscle; internal carotid artery; left lung lobe; endothelial cell of lymphatic vessel; lactiferous gland; medial ganglionic eminence; More reference expression data
BioGPS	More reference expression data
Gene ontology
Molecular function	structural molecule activity; identical protein binding
Cellular component	membrane; apicolateral plasma membrane; cortical actin cytoskeleton; cell-cell junction; integral component of membrane; bicellular tight junction; plasma membrane; cell junction
Biological process	cell-cell junction assembly; transforming growth factor beta receptor signaling pathway; outflow tract morphogenesis; learning; positive regulation of establishment of endothelial barrier; roof of mouth development; calcium-independent cell-cell adhesion via plasma membrane cell-adhesion molecules; face morphogenesis; regulation of bicellular tight junction assembly
Sources:Amigo / QuickGO
Orthologs
Databases	NCBI: entry; OMA: entry
Species	Human	Mouse
Entrez	7122	12741
Ensembl	ENSG00000184113	ENSMUSG00000041378
UniProt	O00501	O54942
RefSeq (mRNA)	NM_003277; NM_001130861; NM_001363066; NM_001363067	NM_013805
RefSeq (protein)	NP_001124333; NP_003268; NP_001349995; NP_001349996	NP_038833
Location (UCSC)	Chr 22: 19.52 – 19.53 Mb	Chr 16: 18.6 – 18.6 Mb
PubMed search
- Wikidata
View/Edit Human	View/Edit Mouse

Claudin-5 is a protein that in humans is encoded by the CLDN5 gene. It belongs to the group of claudins.

== Function ==
This gene encodes a member of the claudin family. Claudins are integral membrane proteins and components of tight junction strands. Tight junction strands serve as a physical barrier to prevent solutes and water from passing freely through the paracellular space between epithelial or endothelial cell sheets. Mutations in this gene have been found in patients with velocardiofacial syndrome.

== Interactions ==
CLDN5 has been shown to interact with CLDN1 and CLDN3.
