= LAT2 =

Protein-coding gene in the species Homo sapiens

Available structures
| PDB | Ortholog search: PDBe RCSB |
| PDB | List of PDB id codes 3MAZ |

Identifiers
- Aliases: LAT2, LAB, NTAL, WBSCR15, WBSCR5, WSCR5, HSPC046, linker for activation of T-cells family member 2, linker for activation of T cells family member 2
- External IDs: OMIM: 605719; MGI: 1926479; HomoloGene: 11297; GeneCards: LAT2; OMA:LAT2 - orthologs

Gene location (Human)
| Chr. | Chromosome 7 (human) |
| Band | 7q11.23 | Start | 74,199,652 bp |
| Band | 7q11.23 | End | 74,229,834 bp |

Gene location (Mouse)
| Chr. | Chromosome 5 (mouse) |
| Band | 5|5 G2 | Start | 134,628,876 bp |
| Band | 5|5 G2 | End | 134,643,879 bp |
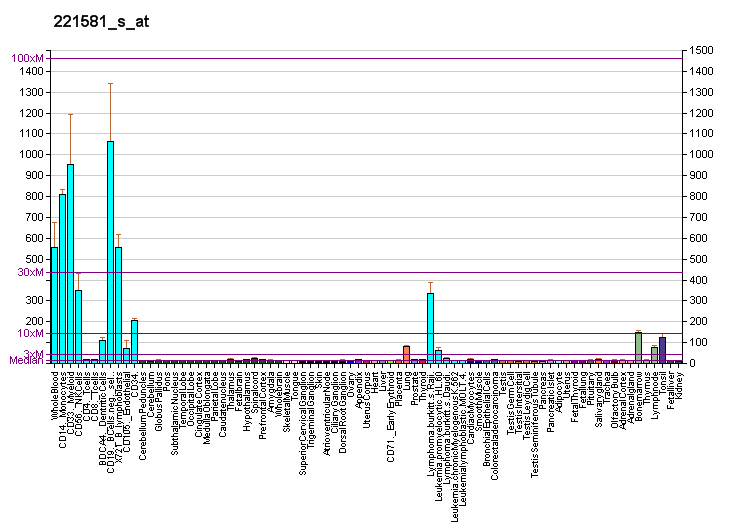
RNA expression pattern
| Bgee | Human / Mouse (ortholog); Top expressed in: monocyte; granulocyte; blood; bone marrow; spleen; appendix; bone marrow cells; lymph node; trabecular bone; superficial temporal artery / Top expressed in: spleen; granulocyte; ankle joint; mesenteric lymph nodes; blood; spermatocyte; morula; lip; stroma of bone marrow; embryo; More reference expression data |
| BioGPS | More reference expression data |
Gene ontology
| Molecular function | protein binding; SH2 domain binding |
| Cellular component | integral component of membrane; membrane raft; mast cell granule; plasma membrane; extracellular exosome; membrane; intracellular anatomical structure |
| Biological process | B cell receptor signaling pathway; Fc-epsilon receptor signaling pathway; B cell activation; immune response-regulating signaling pathway; intracellular signal transduction; mast cell degranulation; adaptive immune response; calcium-mediated signaling; immune system process |
Sources:Amigo / QuickGO
Orthologs
| Species | Human | Mouse |
| Entrez | 7462 | 56743 |
| Ensembl | ENSG00000086730 | ENSMUSG00000040751 |
| UniProt | Q9GZY6 | Q9JHL0 |
| RefSeq (mRNA) | NM_014146; NM_032463; NM_032464 | NM_020044; NM_022964 |
| RefSeq (protein) | NP_054865; NP_115852; NP_115853 | NP_064428; NP_075253 |
| Location (UCSC) | Chr 7: 74.2 – 74.23 Mb | Chr 5: 134.63 – 134.64 Mb |
| PubMed search |
- Wikidata
| View/Edit Human | View/Edit Mouse |

Linker for activation of T-cells family member 2 is a protein that in humans is encoded by the LAT2 gene.

This gene is one of the contiguous genes at 7q11.23 commonly deleted in Williams syndrome, a multisystem developmental disorder. This gene consists of at least 14 exons, and its alternative splicing generates 3 transcript variants, all encoding the same protein.
