= CLDN16 =

Protein-coding gene in humans

Identifiers
- Aliases: CLDN16, HOMG3, PCLN1, claudin 16
- External IDs: OMIM: 603959; MGI: 2148742; GeneCards: CLDN16

Gene location (Human)
Chr.	Chromosome 3 (human)
Band	3q28	Start	190,322,541 bp
Band	3q28	End	190,412,138 bp

Gene location (Mouse)
Chr.	Chromosome 16 (mouse)
Band	16|16 B2	Start	26,281,885 bp
Band	16|16 B2	End	26,301,515 bp
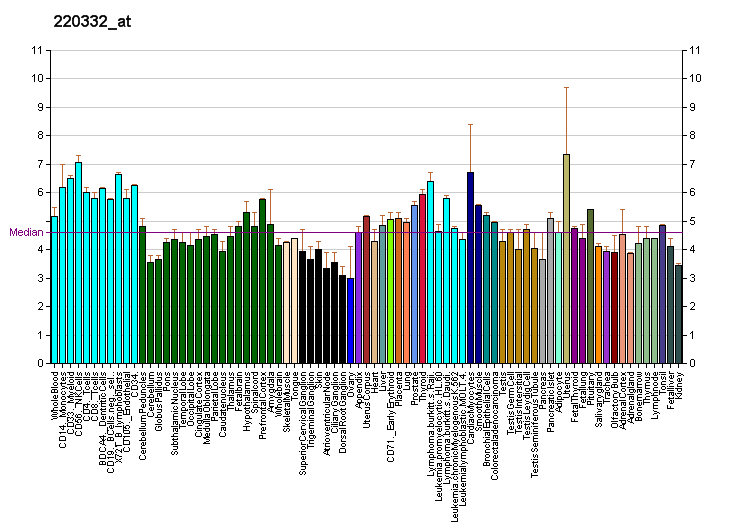
RNA expression pattern
Bgee	Human / Mouse (ortholog); Top expressed in: testicle; olfactory zone of nasal mucosa; human kidney; buccal mucosa cell; skin of abdomen; skin of leg; right uterine tube; bronchial epithelial cell; right adrenal cortex; left adrenal gland / Top expressed in: right kidney; human kidney; embryo; renal cortex; proximal tubule; More reference expression data
BioGPS	More reference expression data
Gene ontology
Molecular function	magnesium ion transmembrane transporter activity; protein binding; structural molecule activity; identical protein binding
Cellular component	integral component of membrane; cell junction; plasma membrane; membrane; bicellular tight junction
Biological process	excretion; calcium-independent cell-cell adhesion via plasma membrane cell-adhesion molecules; ion transport; cellular metal ion homeostasis; magnesium ion transmembrane transport
Sources:Amigo / QuickGO
Orthologs
Databases	NCBI: entry; OMA: entry
Species	Human	Mouse
Entrez	10686	114141
Ensembl	ENSG00000113946	ENSMUSG00000038148
UniProt	Q9Y5I7	Q925N4
RefSeq (mRNA)	NM_006580; NM_001378492; NM_001378493	NM_053241
RefSeq (protein)	NP_006571; NP_001365421; NP_001365422	NP_444471
Location (UCSC)	Chr 3: 190.32 – 190.41 Mb	Chr 16: 26.28 – 26.3 Mb
PubMed search
- Wikidata
View/Edit Human	View/Edit Mouse

Claudin-16 is a protein that in humans is encoded by the CLDN16 gene. It belongs to the group of claudins.

Tight junctions represent one mode of cell-to-cell adhesion in epithelial or endothelial cell sheets, forming continuous seals around cells and serving as a physical barrier to prevent solutes and water from passing freely through the paracellular space. These junctions are composed of sets of continuous networking strands in the outwardly facing cytoplasmic leaflet, with complementary grooves in the inwardly facing extracytoplasmic leaflet. The protein encoded by this gene, a member of the claudin family, is an integral membrane protein and a component of tight junction strands. It is found primarily in the kidneys, specifically in the thick ascending limb of Henle, where it acts as either an intercellular pore or ion concentration sensor to regulate the paracellular resorption of magnesium ions. Defects in this gene are a cause of primary hypomagnesemia, which is characterized by massive renal magnesium wasting with hypomagnesemia and hypercalciuria, resulting in nephrocalcinosis and kidney failure.
