= Supravalvular aortic stenosis =

Narrowing of the aorta just above the aortic valve of the heart

- Specialty: Medical genetics
- Causes: Williams syndrome
- Diagnostic method: echocardiography or MRI

Supravalvular aortic stenosis is a congenital obstructive narrowing of the aorta just above the aortic valve and is the least common type of aortic stenosis. It is often associated with other cardiovascular anomalies and is one of the characteristic findings of Williams syndrome. The diagnosis can be made by echocardiography or MRI.

== Genetics ==
Supravalvular aortic stenosis is associated with genetic damage at the Elastin gene locus on chromosome 7q11.23. Fluorescent in situ hybridisation techniques have revealed that 96% of patients with Williams syndrome, where supravalvular aortic stenosis is characteristic, have a hemizygous deletion of the Elastin gene. Further studies have shown that patients with less extensive deletions featuring the Elastin gene also tend to develop supravalvular aortic stenosis

== Pathophysiology ==
Supravalvular aortic stenosis is due to diffuse or discrete narrowing of ascending aorta. The murmur associated with it is systolic murmur and is similar in character to valvular aortic stenosis murmur but commonly present at 1st Intercostal space (ICS) on the right. Individuals with this anomaly may have unequal carotid pulses, differential blood pressure in upper extremities and a palpable thrill in Suprasternal notch. Individuals with significant supravalvular AS chronically may develop left ventricular hypertrophy and also are at risk of developing coronary artery stenosis. With increased metabolic demands (e.g. exercise) such individuals may develop subendocardial or myocardial ischemia due to increased myocardial oxygen demand and seek medical help with symptoms of exercise induced angina.

== Diagnosis ==
Diagnosis is typically made through echocardiograpy.
