= CLDN12 =

Protein-coding gene in humans

Identifiers
- Aliases: CLDN12, claudin 12
- External IDs: OMIM: 611232; MGI: 1929288; GeneCards: CLDN12

Gene location (Human)
Chr.	Chromosome 7 (human)
Band	7q21.13	Start	90,383,721 bp
Band	7q21.13	End	90,513,402 bp

Gene location (Mouse)
Chr.	Chromosome 5 (mouse)
Band	5|5 A1	Start	5,539,537 bp
Band	5|5 A1	End	5,564,958 bp
RNA expression pattern
Bgee	Human / Mouse (ortholog); Top expressed in: secondary oocyte; islet of Langerhans; pancreatic epithelial cell; cartilage tissue; mucosa of sigmoid colon; right lobe of liver; rectum; pituitary gland; anterior pituitary; myocardium of left ventricle / Top expressed in: otolith organ; utricle; interventricular septum; retinal pigment epithelium; ascending aorta; supraoptic nucleus; ciliary body; primitive streak; aortic valve; epithelium of lens; More reference expression data
BioGPS	n/a
Gene ontology
Molecular function	structural molecule activity; identical protein binding; protein binding
Cellular component	integral component of membrane; cell junction; lateral plasma membrane; membrane; cell periphery; bicellular tight junction; plasma membrane
Biological process	calcium-independent cell-cell adhesion via plasma membrane cell-adhesion molecules
Sources:Amigo / QuickGO
Orthologs
Databases	NCBI: entry; OMA: entry
Species	Human	Mouse
Entrez	9069	64945
Ensembl	ENSG00000157224	ENSMUSG00000046798
UniProt	P56749	Q9ET43
RefSeq (mRNA)	NM_012129; NM_001185072; NM_001185073	NM_001193659; NM_001193660; NM_001193661; NM_022890
RefSeq (protein)	NP_001172001; NP_001172002; NP_036261	NP_001180588; NP_001180589; NP_001180590; NP_075028
Location (UCSC)	Chr 7: 90.38 – 90.51 Mb	Chr 5: 5.54 – 5.56 Mb
PubMed search
- Wikidata
View/Edit Human	View/Edit Mouse

Claudin-12 is a protein that in humans is encoded by the CLDN12 gene. It belongs to the group of claudins.
