= CLDN8 =

Protein-coding gene in humans

Identifiers
- Aliases: CLDN8, HEL-S-79, claudin 8
- External IDs: OMIM: 611231; MGI: 1859286; GeneCards: CLDN8

Gene location (Human)
Chr.	Chromosome 21 (human)
Band	21q22.11	Start	30,214,006 bp
Band	21q22.11	End	30,216,097 bp

Gene location (Mouse)
Chr.	Chromosome 16 (mouse)
Band	16|16 C3.3	Start	88,357,716 bp
Band	16|16 C3.3	End	88,360,071 bp
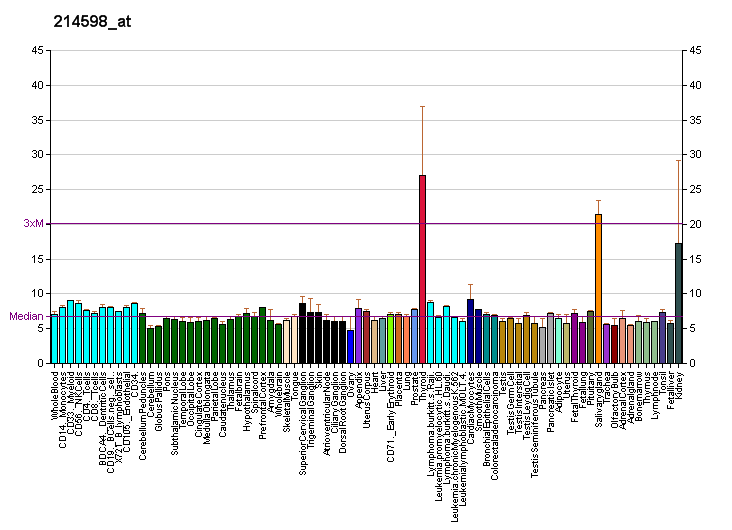
RNA expression pattern
Bgee	Human / Mouse (ortholog); Top expressed in: mucosa of sigmoid colon; kidney tubule; parotid gland; rectum; renal medulla; bronchial epithelial cell; human kidney; hair follicle; skin of thigh; seminal vesicula / Top expressed in: seminal vesicula; transitional epithelium of urinary bladder; vestibular membrane of cochlear duct; vestibular sensory epithelium; left colon; right kidney; submandibular gland; parotid gland; medullary collecting duct; stria vascularis; More reference expression data
BioGPS	More reference expression data
Gene ontology
Molecular function	structural molecule activity; protein binding; identical protein binding
Cellular component	membrane; cell junction; basolateral plasma membrane; integral component of membrane; apicolateral plasma membrane; endoplasmic reticulum; plasma membrane; bicellular tight junction
Biological process	calcium-independent cell-cell adhesion via plasma membrane cell-adhesion molecules
Sources:Amigo / QuickGO
Orthologs
Databases	NCBI: entry; OMA: entry
Species	Human	Mouse
Entrez	9073	54420
Ensembl	ENSG00000156284	ENSMUSG00000050520
UniProt	P56748	Q9Z260
RefSeq (mRNA)	NM_199328; NM_012132	NM_018778
RefSeq (protein)	NP_955360	NP_061248
Location (UCSC)	Chr 21: 30.21 – 30.22 Mb	Chr 16: 88.36 – 88.36 Mb
PubMed search
- Wikidata
View/Edit Human	View/Edit Mouse

Claudin-8 is a protein that in humans is encoded by the CLDN8 gene. It belongs to the group of claudins.
