= CLDN9 =

Protein-coding gene in humans

Identifiers
- Aliases: CLDN9, claudin 9, DFNB116
- External IDs: OMIM: 615799; MGI: 1913100; GeneCards: CLDN9

Gene location (Human)
Chr.	Chromosome 16 (human)
Band	16p13.3	Start	3,012,923 bp
Band	16p13.3	End	3,014,505 bp

Gene location (Mouse)
Chr.	Chromosome 17 (mouse)
Band	17|17 A3.3	Start	23,901,558 bp
Band	17|17 A3.3	End	23,903,000 bp
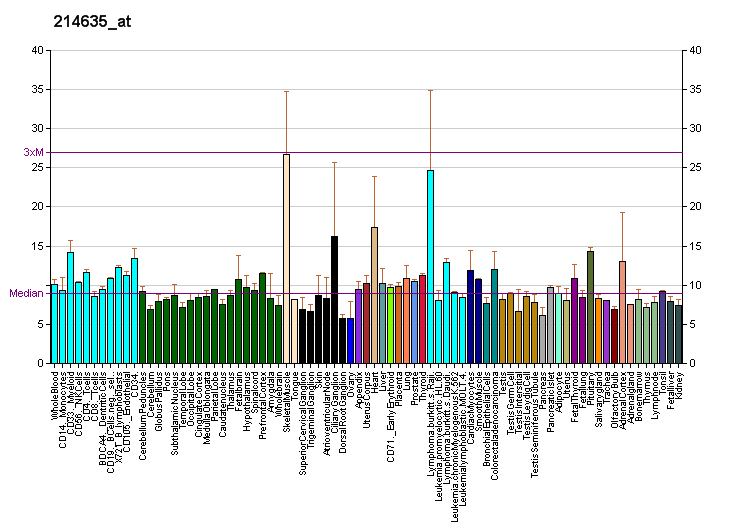
RNA expression pattern
Bgee	Human / Mouse (ortholog); Top expressed in: right hemisphere of cerebellum; pituitary gland; anterior pituitary; testicle; blood; body of pancreas; right uterine tube; right lobe of liver; C1 segment; apex of heart / Top expressed in: vestibular sensory epithelium; vestibular membrane of cochlear duct; olfactory epithelium; stria vascularis; pituitary gland; lumbar spinal ganglion; utricle; Epithelium of choroid plexus; median eminence; internal carotid artery; More reference expression data
BioGPS	More reference expression data
Gene ontology
Molecular function	structural molecule activity; identical protein binding; protein binding; virus receptor activity
Cellular component	integral component of membrane; membrane; bicellular tight junction; cell junction; intracellular membrane-bounded organelle; plasma membrane
Biological process	calcium-independent cell-cell adhesion via plasma membrane cell-adhesion molecules; viral process; cell-cell junction organization; viral entry into host cell; tight junction organization
Sources:Amigo / QuickGO
Orthologs
Databases	NCBI: entry; OMA: entry
Species	Human	Mouse
Entrez	9080	56863
Ensembl	ENSG00000213937	ENSMUSG00000066720
UniProt	O95484	Q9Z0S7
RefSeq (mRNA)	NM_020982	NM_020293
RefSeq (protein)	NP_066192	NP_064689
Location (UCSC)	Chr 16: 3.01 – 3.01 Mb	Chr 17: 23.9 – 23.9 Mb
PubMed search
- Wikidata
View/Edit Human	View/Edit Mouse

Claudin-9 is a protein that in humans is encoded by the CLDN9 gene. It belongs to the group of claudins.

This gene is expressed in the inner ear, olfactory epithelium, and anterior pituitary gland and is involved in hearing.
