= CLIP2 =

Protein-coding gene in the species Homo sapiens

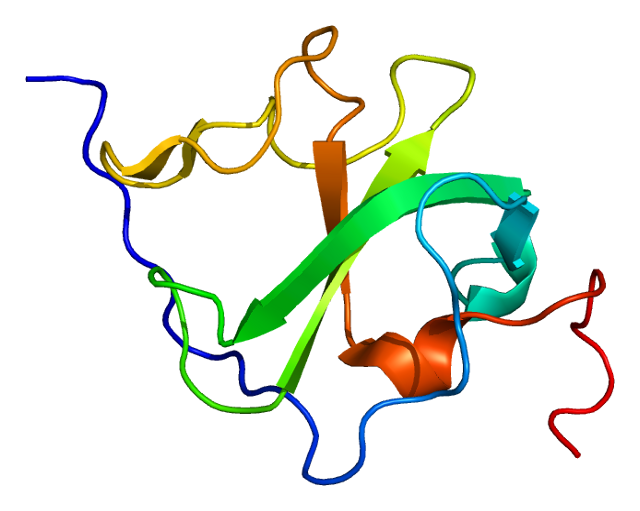

Identifiers
- Aliases: CLIP2, CLIP, CLIP-115, CYLN2, WBSCR3, WBSCR4, WSCR3, WSCR4, CAP-Gly domain containing linker protein 2
- External IDs: OMIM: 603432; MGI: 1313136; GeneCards: CLIP2
Available structures
PDB	Ortholog search: PDBe RCSB
PDB	List of PDB id codes 2CP2, 2CP3

Gene location (Human)
Chr.	Chromosome 7 (human)
Band	7q11.23	Start	74,289,407 bp
Band	7q11.23	End	74,405,935 bp

Gene location (Mouse)
Chr.	Chromosome 5 (mouse)
Band	5 G2|5 74.63 cM	Start	134,518,237 bp
Band	5 G2|5 74.63 cM	End	134,581,288 bp
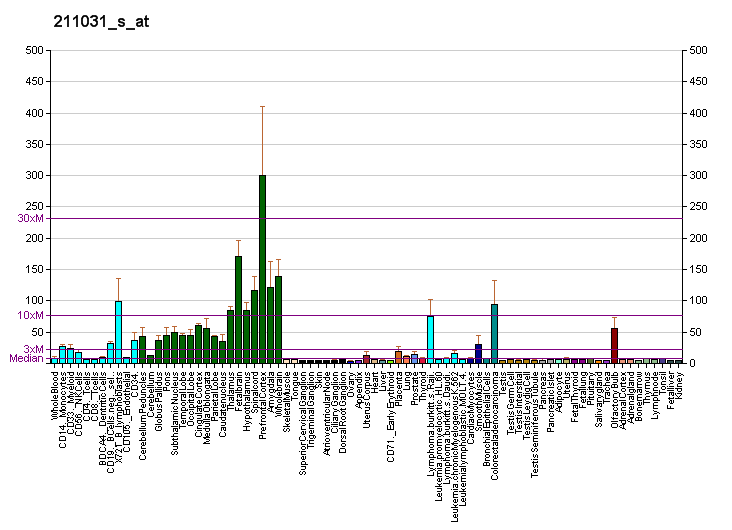
RNA expression pattern
Bgee	Human / Mouse (ortholog); Top expressed in: C1 segment; ganglionic eminence; dorsal motor nucleus of vagus nerve; prefrontal cortex; inferior olivary nucleus; optic nerve; right frontal lobe; amygdala; Brodmann area 10; postcentral gyrus / Top expressed in: dentate gyrus of hippocampal formation granule cell; superior frontal gyrus; primary visual cortex; ventricular zone; supraoptic nucleus; molar; granulocyte; cerebellar cortex; neural layer of retina; genital tubercle; More reference expression data
BioGPS	More reference expression data
Orthologs
Databases	NCBI: entry; OMA: entry
Species	Human	Mouse
Entrez	7461	269713
Ensembl	ENSG00000106665	ENSMUSG00000063146
UniProt	Q9UDT6	Q9Z0H8
RefSeq (mRNA)	NM_032421; NM_003388	NM_001039162; NM_009990
RefSeq (protein)	NP_003379; NP_115797	NP_001034251; NP_034120
Location (UCSC)	Chr 7: 74.29 – 74.41 Mb	Chr 5: 134.52 – 134.58 Mb
PubMed search
- Wikidata
View/Edit Human	View/Edit Mouse

CAP-Gly domain-containing linker protein 2 is a protein that in humans is encoded by the CLIP2 gene.

The protein encoded by this gene belongs to the family of cytoplasmic linker proteins, which have been proposed to mediate the interaction between specific membranous organelles and microtubules. This protein was found to associate with both microtubules and an organelle called the dendritic lamellar body. This gene is hemizygously deleted in Williams syndrome, a multisystem developmental disorder caused by the deletion of contiguous genes at 7q11.23. Alternative splicing of this gene generates 2 transcript variants.
