= BAZ1B =

Protein-coding gene in the species Homo sapiens

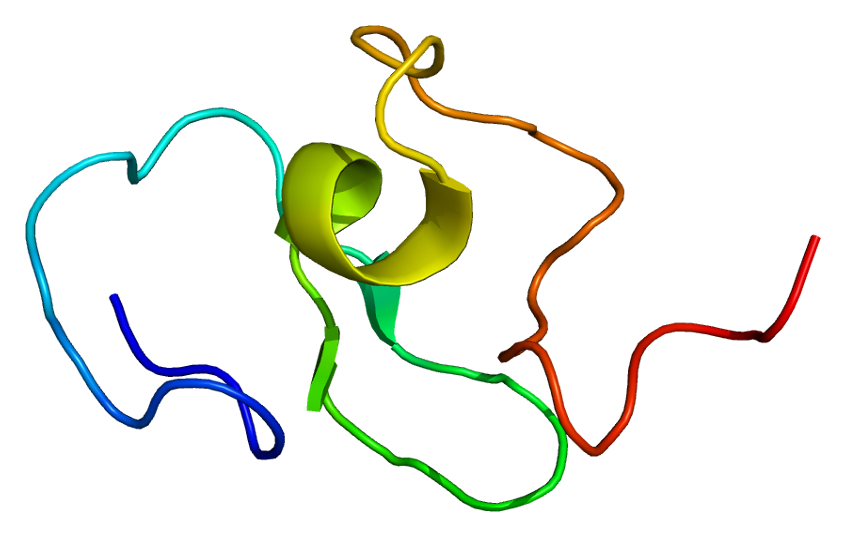

Identifiers
- Aliases: BAZ1B, WBSCR10, WBSCR9, WSTF, bromodomain adjacent to zinc finger domain 1B
- External IDs: OMIM: 605681; MGI: 1353499; GeneCards: BAZ1B
Available structures
PDB	Ortholog search: PDBe RCSB
PDB	List of PDB id codes 1F62
Enzyme activity
EC #	BRENDA	ExPASy	KEGG	MetaCyc
2.7.10.2	↗	↗	↗	↗

Gene location (Human)
Chr.	Chromosome 7 (human)
Band	7q11.23	Start	73,440,406 bp
Band	7q11.23	End	73,522,293 bp

Gene location (Mouse)
Chr.	Chromosome 5 (mouse)
Band	5|5 G2	Start	135,216,118 bp
Band	5|5 G2	End	135,274,983 bp
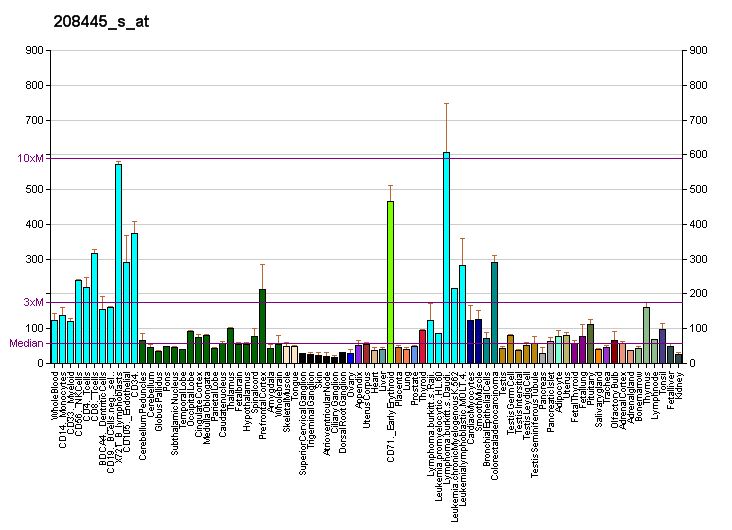
RNA expression pattern
Bgee	Human / Mouse (ortholog); Top expressed in: oocyte; secondary oocyte; ventricular zone; ganglionic eminence; sural nerve; Achilles tendon; cerebellar vermis; stromal cell of endometrium; islet of Langerhans; paraflocculus of cerebellum / Top expressed in: Ileal epithelium; tail of embryo; mandibular prominence; maxillary prominence; genital tubercle; zygote; secondary oocyte; condyle; ventricular zone; tibiofemoral joint; More reference expression data
BioGPS	More reference expression data
Gene ontology
Molecular function	transferase activity; nucleotide binding; histone kinase activity; histone binding; non-membrane spanning protein tyrosine kinase activity; metal ion binding; kinase activity; protein binding; protein tyrosine kinase activity; ATP binding; zinc ion binding
Cellular component	pericentric heterochromatin; nuclear replication fork; nucleoplasm; condensed chromosome; nucleus; nuclear body
Biological process	epigenetic maintenance of chromatin in transcription-competent conformation; chromatin remodeling; phosphorylation; transcription, DNA-templated; cellular response to DNA damage stimulus; peptidyl-tyrosine phosphorylation; regulation of transcription, DNA-templated; regulation of transcription by RNA polymerase II
Sources:Amigo / QuickGO
Orthologs
Databases	NCBI: entry; OMA: entry
Species	Human	Mouse
Entrez	9031	22385
Ensembl	ENSG00000009954	ENSMUSG00000002748
UniProt	Q9UIG0	Q9Z277
RefSeq (mRNA)	NM_023005; NM_032408; NM_001370402	NM_011714
RefSeq (protein)	NP_115784; NP_001357331	NP_035844
Location (UCSC)	Chr 7: 73.44 – 73.52 Mb	Chr 5: 135.22 – 135.27 Mb
PubMed search
- Wikidata
View/Edit Human	View/Edit Mouse

Bromodomain adjacent to zinc finger domain, 1B (BAZ1B) is an enzyme that in humans is encoded by the BAZ1B gene.

== Function ==
This gene encodes a member of the bromodomain protein family. The bromodomain is a structural motif characteristic of proteins involved in chromatin-dependent regulation of transcription. This gene is deleted in Williams-Beuren syndrome, a developmental disorder caused by deletion of multiple genes at 7q11.23.

BAZ1B has been found to affect the activity of 448 other genes and is very important in the development of the neural crest and the face. Research suggests that changes in BAZ1B may have been involved in "self-domesticating" humans.
