= GTF2IRD1 =

Protein-coding gene in the species Homo sapiens

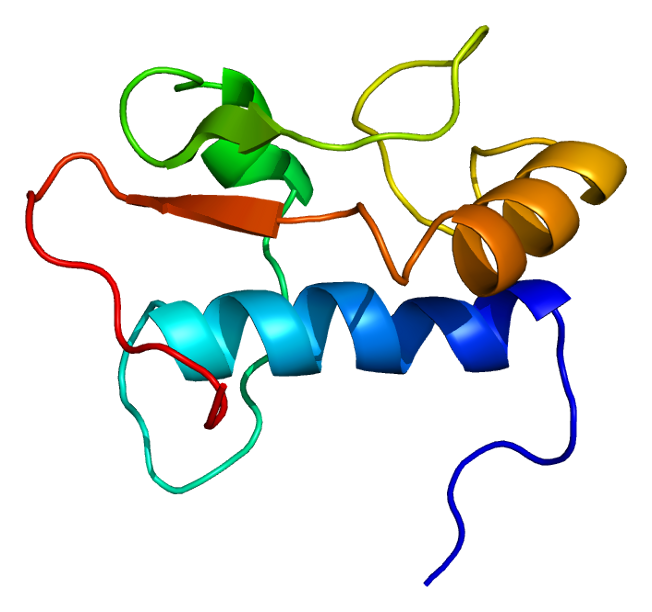

Identifiers
- Aliases: GTF2IRD1, BEN, CREAM1, GTF3, MUSTRD1, RBAP2, WBS, WBSCR11, WBSCR12, hMusTRD1alpha1, GTF2I repeat domain containing 1
- External IDs: OMIM: 604318; MGI: 1861942; GeneCards: GTF2IRD1
Available structures
PDB	Ortholog search: PDBe RCSB
PDB	List of PDB id codes 2D99, 2DN5, 2DZQ, 2DZR

Gene location (Human)
Chr.	Chromosome 7 (human)
Band	7q11.23	Start	74,453,790 bp
Band	7q11.23	End	74,602,605 bp

Gene location (Mouse)
Chr.	Chromosome 5 (mouse)
Band	5 G2|5 74.55 cM	Start	134,386,510 bp
Band	5 G2|5 74.55 cM	End	134,485,570 bp
RNA expression pattern
Bgee	Human / Mouse (ortholog); Top expressed in: muscle of thigh; tibialis anterior muscle; anterior pituitary; gastrocnemius muscle; Skeletal muscle tissue of biceps brachii; mucosa of pharynx; glutes; body of tongue; stromal cell of endometrium; deltoid muscle / Top expressed in: saccule; otic vesicle; neural layer of retina; zygote; mandibular prominence; otic placode; genital tubercle; molar; ventricular zone; epiblast; More reference expression data
BioGPS	n/a
Gene ontology
Molecular function	DNA-binding transcription factor activity; transcription factor activity, RNA polymerase II distal enhancer sequence-specific binding; DNA-binding transcription factor activity, RNA polymerase II-specific; DNA binding; protein binding
Cellular component	nucleus; nucleoplasm; cytoplasm; cytosol
Biological process	regulation of transcription, DNA-templated; transcription, DNA-templated; transition between slow and fast fiber; regulation of transcription by RNA polymerase II; multicellular organism development; transcription by RNA polymerase II
Sources:Amigo / QuickGO
Orthologs
Databases	NCBI: entry; OMA: entry
Species	Human	Mouse
Entrez	9569	57080
Ensembl	ENSG00000006704	ENSMUSG00000023079
UniProt	Q9UHL9	Q9JI57
RefSeq (mRNA)	NM_001199207; NM_005685; NM_016328	NM_001081462; NM_001081463; NM_001081464; NM_001081465; NM_001081466 NM_001081467; NM_001081468; NM_001081469; NM_001081470; NM_001244936; NM_020331; NM_001347488
RefSeq (protein)	NP_001186136; NP_005676; NP_057412	NP_001074931; NP_001074932; NP_001074933; NP_001074934; NP_001074935 NP_001074936; NP_001074937; NP_001074938; NP_001074939; NP_001231865; NP_001334417; NP_065064
Location (UCSC)	Chr 7: 74.45 – 74.6 Mb	Chr 5: 134.39 – 134.49 Mb
PubMed search
- Wikidata
View/Edit Human	View/Edit Mouse

General transcription factor II-I repeat domain-containing protein 1 is a protein that in humans is encoded by the GTF2IRD1 gene.

The protein encoded by this gene contains five GTF2I-like repeats and each repeat possesses a potential helix-loop-helix (HLH) motif. It may have the ability to interact with other HLH-proteins and function as a transcription factor or as a positive transcriptional regulator under the control of Retinoblastoma protein. This gene is deleted in Williams syndrome, a multisystem developmental disorder caused by deletion of multiple genes at 7q11.23. Alternative splicing of this gene generates at least 2 transcript variants.
