= FKBP6 =

Protein-coding gene found in humans

Identifiers
- Aliases: FKBP6, FKBP36, FK506 binding protein 6, FKBP prolyl isomerase 6, FKBP prolyl isomerase family member 6 (inactive)
- External IDs: OMIM: 604839; MGI: 2137612; GeneCards: FKBP6
Available structures
PDB	Ortholog search: PDBe RCSB
PDB	List of PDB id codes 3B7X

Gene location (Human)
Chr.	Chromosome 7 (human)
Band	7q11.23	Start	73,328,161 bp
Band	7q11.23	End	73,358,637 bp

Gene location (Mouse)
Chr.	Chromosome 5 (mouse)
Band	5 G2|5 75.11 cM	Start	135,320,558 bp
Band	5 G2|5 75.11 cM	End	135,378,898 bp
RNA expression pattern
Bgee	Human / Mouse (ortholog); Top expressed in: left testis; right testis; sperm; oocyte; testicle; gonad; secondary oocyte; striated muscle tissue; skeletal muscle tissue; olfactory zone of nasal mucosa / Top expressed in: morula; spermatocyte; seminiferous tubule; Gonadal ridge; spermatid; blastocyst; embryo; yolk sac; primary oocyte; ovary; More reference expression data
BioGPS	n/a
Gene ontology
Molecular function	Hsp90 protein binding; protein binding; peptidyl-prolyl cis-trans isomerase activity; identical protein binding; FK506 binding; isomerase activity
Cellular component	cytosol; synaptonemal complex; nucleus; chromosome; cytoplasm
Biological process	peptidyl-proline modification; cell differentiation; gene silencing; protein folding; piRNA metabolic process; spermatogenesis; protein peptidyl-prolyl isomerization; DNA methylation involved in gamete generation; chaperone-mediated protein folding; positive regulation of viral genome replication; meiosis
Sources:Amigo / QuickGO
Orthologs
Databases	NCBI: entry; OMA: entry
Species	Human	Mouse
Entrez	8468	94244
Ensembl	ENSG00000077800	ENSMUSG00000040013
UniProt	O75344	Q91XW8
RefSeq (mRNA)	NM_001135211; NM_001281304; NM_003602; NM_001362789	NM_001277891; NM_001277892; NM_001277893; NM_033571
RefSeq (protein)	NP_001128683; NP_001268233; NP_003593; NP_001349718	NP_001264820; NP_001264821; NP_001264822; NP_291049
Location (UCSC)	Chr 7: 73.33 – 73.36 Mb	Chr 5: 135.32 – 135.38 Mb
PubMed search
- Wikidata
View/Edit Human	View/Edit Mouse

FK506 binding protein 6, also known as FKBP6, is a human gene. The encoded protein shows structural homology to FKBP immunophilins, which bind to the immunosuppressants FK506 and rapamycin.

FKBP6 is essential for homologous chromosome pairing in meiosis during spermatogenesis. Targeted inactivation of FKBP6 in mice results in infertile males, but apparently normal females. Rats with spermatogenic failure at meiosis were found to have a deletion in the exon 8 portion of the FKBP6 gene. Mutations in this gene have been associated with male infertility in humans.

FKBP6 is deleted in Williams syndrome, however this hemizygous loss of FKBP6 is not associated with infertility.

FKBP6 contains 3 α-helices and 11 β-sheet strands, and as a FK506-family protein, has been shown to be a potent immunosuppressant which can assist in the prevention of allograft rejections.
