= Frizzled-9 =

Protein-coding gene in the species Homo sapiens

FZD9

Identifiers
- Aliases: FZD9, CD349, FZD3, frizzled class receptor 9
- External IDs: OMIM: 601766; MGI: 1313278; GeneCards: FZD9

Gene location (Human)
Chr.	Chromosome 7 (human)
Band	7q11.23	Start	73,433,778 bp
Band	7q11.23	End	73,436,120 bp

Gene location (Mouse)
Chr.	Chromosome 5 (mouse)
Band	5 G2|5 75.08 cM	Start	135,277,792 bp
Band	5 G2|5 75.08 cM	End	135,280,084 bp
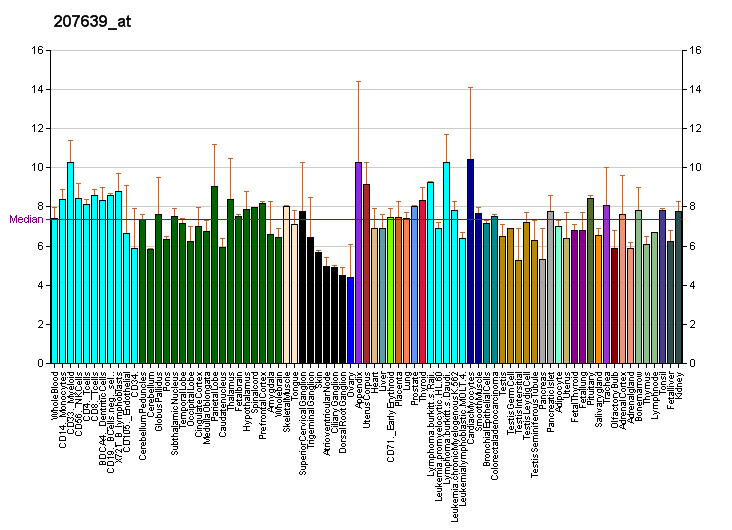
RNA expression pattern
Bgee	Human / Mouse (ortholog); Top expressed in: cartilage tissue; muscle of thigh; gastrocnemius muscle; amygdala; cingulate gyrus; anterior cingulate cortex; prefrontal cortex; C1 segment; hypothalamus; right frontal lobe / Top expressed in: rib; myotome; soleus muscle; lumbar subsegment of spinal cord; lumbar spine; ventricular zone; stria vascularis; plantaris muscle; larynx; extensor digitorum longus muscle; More reference expression data
BioGPS	More reference expression data
Gene ontology
Molecular function	protein homodimerization activity; signal transducer activity; Wnt-protein binding; protein heterodimerization activity; transmembrane signaling receptor activity; G protein-coupled receptor activity; Wnt-activated receptor activity
Cellular component	cytoplasm; membrane; plasma membrane; cell surface; perinuclear region of cytoplasm; filopodium membrane; endoplasmic reticulum membrane; Golgi apparatus; mitochondrial membranes; integral component of membrane; postsynapse; glutamatergic synapse
Biological process	G protein-coupled receptor signaling pathway; Wnt signaling pathway; nervous system development; multicellular organism development; cell surface receptor signaling pathway; learning or memory; neuroblast proliferation; B cell differentiation; signal transduction; ossification; release of cytochrome c from mitochondria; positive regulation of bone mineralization; positive regulation of apoptotic process; negative regulation of neuron apoptotic process; regulation of cytosolic calcium ion concentration; negative regulation of mitochondrial depolarization; negative regulation of necroptotic process; positive regulation of canonical Wnt signaling pathway; negative regulation of mitochondrial outer membrane permeabilization involved in apoptotic signaling pathway; regulation of skeletal muscle acetylcholine-gated channel clustering; negative regulation of skeletal muscle acetylcholine-gated channel clustering; bone regeneration; positive regulation of neural precursor cell proliferation; non-canonical Wnt signaling pathway; canonical Wnt signaling pathway; postsynapse organization; regulation of postsynaptic cytosolic calcium ion concentration
Sources:Amigo / QuickGO
Orthologs
Databases	NCBI: entry; OMA: entry
Species	Human	Mouse
Entrez	8326	14371
Ensembl	ENSG00000188763	ENSMUSG00000049551
UniProt	O00144	Q9R216
RefSeq (mRNA)	NM_003508	NM_010246
RefSeq (protein)	NP_003499	NP_034376
Location (UCSC)	Chr 7: 73.43 – 73.44 Mb	Chr 5: 135.28 – 135.28 Mb
PubMed search
- Wikidata
View/Edit Human	View/Edit Mouse

Frizzled-9 (Fz-9) is a protein that in humans is encoded by the FZD9 gene. Fz-9 has also been designated as CD349 (cluster of differentiation 349).

== Function ==
Members of the 'frizzled' gene family encode 7-transmembrane domain proteins that are receptors for Wnt signaling proteins. The FZD9 gene is located within the Williams syndrome common deletion region of chromosome 7, and heterozygous deletion of the FZD9 gene may contribute to the Williams syndrome phenotype. FZD9 is expressed predominantly in brain, testis, eye, skeletal muscle, and kidney.
