= KCTD7 =

Protein-coding gene in the species Homo sapiens

Identifiers
- Aliases: KCTD7, CLN14, EPM3, potassium channel tetramerization domain containing 7
- External IDs: OMIM: 611725; MGI: 2442265; GeneCards: KCTD7

Gene location (Human)
Chr.	Chromosome 7 (human)
Band	7q11.21	Start	66,628,881 bp
Band	7q11.21	End	66,649,067 bp
RNA expression pattern
Bgee	Human / Mouse (ortholog); Top expressed in: ganglionic eminence; C1 segment; middle frontal gyrus; ventricular zone; stromal cell of endometrium; buccal mucosa cell; substantia nigra; Brodmann area 10; tendon of biceps brachii; nucleus accumbens / n/a; More reference expression data
BioGPS	n/a
Gene ontology
Molecular function	protein binding
Cellular component	membrane; cytosol; cytoplasm; plasma membrane
Biological process	protein homooligomerization; post-translational protein modification; cellular potassium ion homeostasis; positive regulation of transporter activity; membrane hyperpolarization; glutamate homeostasis
Sources:Amigo / QuickGO
Orthologs
Databases	NCBI: entry; OMA: entry
Species	Human	Mouse
Entrez	154881	212919
Ensembl	ENSG00000243335	n/a
UniProt	Q96MP8	Q8BJK1
RefSeq (mRNA)	NM_153033; NM_001167961	NM_172509
RefSeq (protein)	NP_001161433; NP_694578; NP_694578.1	NP_766097
Location (UCSC)	Chr 7: 66.63 – 66.65 Mb	n/a
PubMed search
- Wikidata
View/Edit Human	View/Edit Mouse

Potassium channel tetramerisation domain containing 7 is a protein in humans that is encoded by the KCTD7 gene. Alternative splicing results in multiple transcript variants.

== Description ==
The KCTD7 gene encodes a member of the potassium channel tetramerisation domain-containing protein family. Family members are identified on a structural basis and contain an amino-terminal domain similar to the T1 domain present in the voltage-gated potassium channel. KCTD7 displays a primary sequence and hydropathy profile indicating intracytoplasmic localization. EST database analysis showed that KCTD7 is expressed in human and mouse brain.

== Function ==
KCTD7 expression hyperpolarizes the cell membrane and reduces the excitability of transfected neurons in patch clamp experiments. KCTD7 mRNA and protein are expressed in hippocampal neurons, deep layers of the cerebral cortex and Purkinje cells of the murine brain as shown by in situ hybridization and immunohistochemistry experiments. Immunoprecipitation assays demonstrates that KCTD7 is able to prudhommerie and directly interacts with cullin-3 (CUL3), a component of the ubiquitin ligase complex. These interactions are thought to be mediated via the BTB/POZ domain of KCTD7. However, KCTD7 does not show any interaction cullin-1 (CUL1). Immunoprecipitation assays also shows that KCTD7 does not interact with Ubiquitin-flag, suggesting a potential role of KCTD7 in the ubiquitin ligase complex without being itself subject to ubiquitination. Immunofluorescence microscopy shows a cytosolic expression of the recombinant GFP-KCTD7 protein in transfected COS-7 cells.

One possible hypothesis is that KCTD7 regulates indirectly the membrane expression level of a potassium channel. By conjugating with cullin-3 ubiquitin ligase complex, KCTD7 may modulate the expression level of a negative regulator of potassium channel. Therefore, the overexpression of KCTD7 in neurons would increase the degradation of that regulatory molecule leading to the increase of potassium current through the cell membrane as observed in patch clamp experiments.

In cultured mouse hippocampal cells, expression is found in the cell soma, in neuritic varicosities along the developing neuronal extensions, and in neurite growth cones, but not in the nucleus. Kctd7 is widely expressed in neurons throughout the intact mouse brain, including in cortical neurons, in granular and pyramidal cell layers of the hippocampus, and in cerebellar Purkinje cells. However, not all neuronal cells are immunopositive for Kctd7, and expression is not seen in astrocytes or microglial cells. Expression is constant from P5 to 2 months in cerebellar lysates. Overexpression of KCTD7 in HeLa and COS-1 cells, which do not express endogenous KCTD7, shows diffuse cytosolic localization, with no colocalization with markers for endosomes, ER, Golgi, lysosomes, or the cytoskeleton.

Beside the BTB/POZ domain of KCTD7, other residues are critical for its proper interaction with cullin-3. Furthermore, a full-length 31-kD Kctd7 isoform is expressed in mouse brain. Other major immunoreactive bands included a 28-kD species in the spleen, liver, and kidneys, a 37-kD species in the kidneys, and a 62-kD form most likely corresponding to a stable dimer. The presence of multiple bands was consistent with alternative splicing and tissue-specific regulation.

== Clinical significance ==
In 3 affected members of a large consanguineous Moroccan family with progressive myoclonic epilepsy-3, a homozygous nonsense mutation in the KCTD7 gene (R99X) has been identified.

In 2 Mexican siblings with infantile onset of progressive myoclonic epilepsy and pathologic findings of neuronal ceroid lipofuscinosis in multiple cell types, a homozygous mutation in the KCTD7 gene (R184C) has been identified. The mutation was identified by whole-exome sequencing and confirmed by Sanger sequencing. This phenotype has been identified as CLN14. KCTD7 mutations were not found in 32 additional CLN samples.
