= CLDN10 =

Protein-coding gene in humans

Identifiers
- Aliases: CLDN10, CPETRL3, OSP-L, claudin 10, OSPL, HELIX
- External IDs: OMIM: 617579; MGI: 1913101; GeneCards: CLDN10

Gene location (Human)
Chr.	Chromosome 13 (human)
Band	13q32.1	Start	95,433,604 bp
Band	13q32.1	End	95,579,759 bp

Gene location (Mouse)
Chr.	Chromosome 14 (mouse)
Band	14 E4|14 62.55 cM	Start	119,025,320 bp
Band	14 E4|14 62.55 cM	End	119,112,901 bp
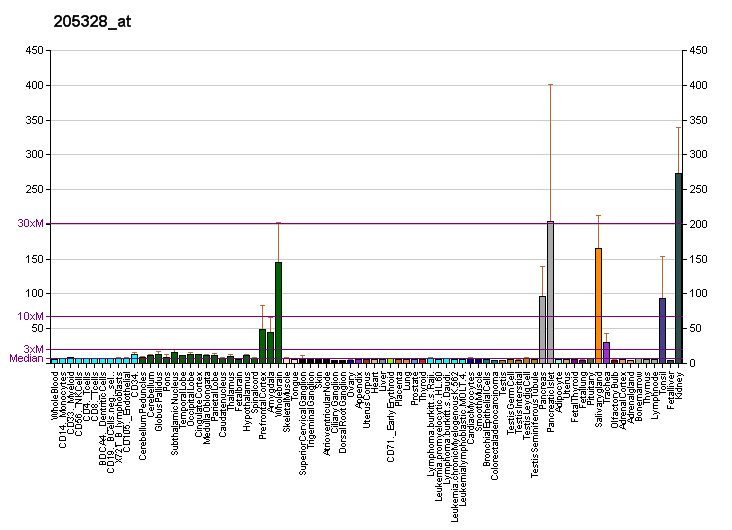
RNA expression pattern
Bgee	Human / Mouse (ortholog); Top expressed in: parotid gland; pancreatic ductal cell; body of pancreas; kidney tubule; human kidney; epithelium of nasopharynx; olfactory zone of nasal mucosa; gallbladder; renal medulla; caput epididymis / Top expressed in: right kidney; submandibular gland; median eminence; parotid gland; human kidney; arcuate nucleus; proximal tubule; left lung lobe; lumbar subsegment of spinal cord; olfactory epithelium; More reference expression data
BioGPS	More reference expression data
Gene ontology
Molecular function	structural molecule activity; identical protein binding
Cellular component	cytoplasm; integral component of membrane; cell junction; membrane; bicellular tight junction; plasma membrane
Biological process	cell adhesion; calcium-independent cell-cell adhesion via plasma membrane cell-adhesion molecules; ion transport; regulation of ion transport
Sources:Amigo / QuickGO
Orthologs
Databases	NCBI: entry; OMA: entry
Species	Human	Mouse
Entrez	9071	58187
Ensembl	ENSG00000134873	ENSMUSG00000022132
UniProt	P78369	Q9Z0S6
RefSeq (mRNA)	NM_001160100; NM_006984; NM_182848	NM_001160096; NM_001160097; NM_001160098; NM_001160099; NM_021386 NM_023878
RefSeq (protein)	NP_001153572; NP_008915; NP_878268	NP_001153568; NP_001153569; NP_001153570; NP_001153571; NP_067361 NP_076367
Location (UCSC)	Chr 13: 95.43 – 95.58 Mb	Chr 14: 119.03 – 119.11 Mb
PubMed search
- Wikidata
View/Edit Human	View/Edit Mouse

Claudin-10 is a protein that in humans is encoded by the CLDN10 gene. It belongs to the group of claudins.

This gene encodes a member of the claudin family. Claudins are integral membrane proteins and components of tight junction strands. Tight junction strands serve as a physical barrier to prevent solutes and water from passing freely through the paracellular space between epithelial or endothelial cell sheets. Two alternatively spliced transcript variants that encode different isoforms have been identified for this gene.
