= Claudin =

Group of proteins forming tight junctions between cells

Claudins are a family of proteins which, along with occludin, are the most important components of the tight junctions (zonulae occludentes). Tight junctions establish the paracellular barrier that controls the flow of molecules in the intercellular space between the cells of an epithelium. They have four transmembrane domains, with the N-terminus and the C-terminus in the cytoplasm.

== Structure ==
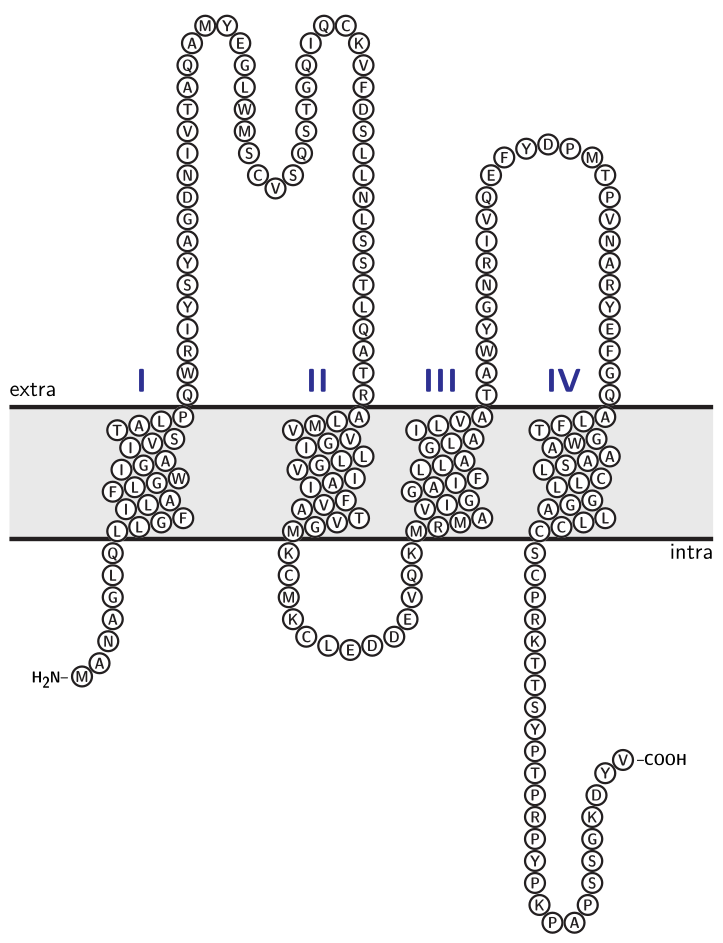
transmembrane domains of claudin-1

Claudins are small (20–24/27 kilodalton (kDa)) transmembrane proteins which are found in many organisms, ranging from nematodes to human beings. They all have a very similar structure. Claudins span the cellular membrane 4 times, with the N-terminal end and the C-terminal end both located in the cytoplasm, and two extracellular loops which show the highest degree of conservation.

Claudins have both cis and trans interactions between cell membranes. Cis-interactions is when claudins on the same membrane interact, one way they interact is by transmembrane domain having molecular interactions. Trans-interaction is when claudins of neighboring cells interact through their extracellular loops. Cis-interactions is also known as side-to-side interactions and trans-interactions is also known as head-to-head interactions.

Generally the tight junction is known for its impermeability. However, depending on the type of claudin and their interactions there is selective permeability. This includes charge selectivity and size selectivity.

=== N-terminal ===
The N-terminal end is usually very short (1–10 amino acids) It is located in the cytoplasm where it is thought to help to contribute to cell signaling, cytoskeletal organization and other possible functions.

=== C-terminal ===
The C-terminal has a longer chain and is located in the cytoplasm. It varies in length from 21 to 63 and is necessary for the localization of these proteins in the tight junctions. It is thought that it may play a role in cell signaling. All human claudins (with the exception of Claudin 12) have domains that let them bind to PDZ domains of scaffold proteins.

=== Transmembrane domain ===
The transmembrane domain is the amino acids that cross the cellular membrane. The transmembrane domain is important for cis-interaction of claudins.

=== First extracellular loop ===
The first extracellular loop has a range of 42-56 amino acids and is longer than the second extracellular loop. It is suspected that the cysteines of found on the first extracellular loop form disulfide bonds. This loop has charged amino acids that may be the predictor for the charge selectivity of tight junctions. The first extracellular loop plays a role in trans-interaction of claudins of adjacent cells.

=== Second extracellular loop ===
The second extracellular loop is shorter than the first extracellular loop. In this short chain of amino acids there are three hydrophobic residues. These three residues are suspected to be a contributor to the trans-interaction of proteins between adjacent cells.

== History ==
Claudins were first named in 1998 by Japanese researchers Mikio Furuse and Shoichiro Tsukita at Kyoto University. The name claudin comes from Latin word claudere ("to close"), suggesting the barrier role of these proteins.

=== Studies ===
A recent review discusses evidence regarding the structure and function of claudin family proteins using a systems approach to understand evidence generated by proteomics techniques.

A chimeric claudin was synthesized to help enhance the understanding of both the structure and function of the tight junction.

Computational modeling is also another technique being used to help enhance research into the structure and functions of claudins.

== Genes ==
PMP22_Claudin

Identifiers
- Symbol: PMP22_Claudin
- Pfam: PF00822
- Pfam clan: CL0375
- InterPro: IPR004031
- PROSITE: PDOC01045
- TCDB: 1.H.1
- OPM superfamily: 194
- OPM protein: 4p79
Available protein structures:
- PDB: IPR004031 PF00822 (ECOD; PDBsum)
- AlphaFold: IPR004031; PF00822

There are 23 genes found in the human genome for claudin proteins and there are 27 transmembrane domains across mammals. The conservation is not observed on a genetic level. Despite the genetic level not being conserved across claudins their structural conservation are very similar.

- CLDN1, CLDN2, CLDN3, CLDN4, CLDN5, CLDN6, CLDN7, CLDN8, CLDN9, CLDN10, CLDN11, CLDN12, CLDN13, CLDN14, CLDN15, CLDN16, CLDN17, CLDN18, CLDN19, CLDN20, CLDN21, CLDN22, CLDN23

== See also ==
- Occludin

== Additional images ==
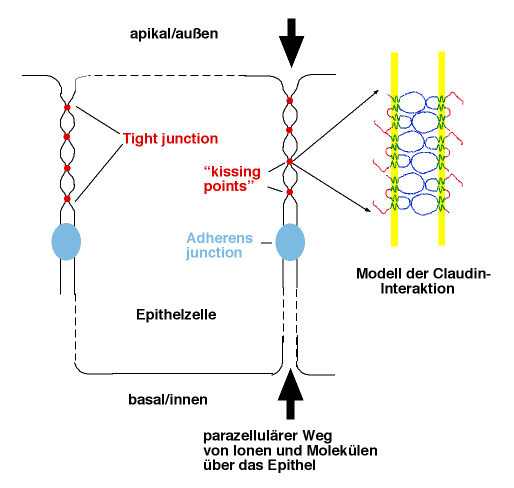

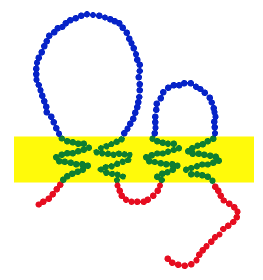

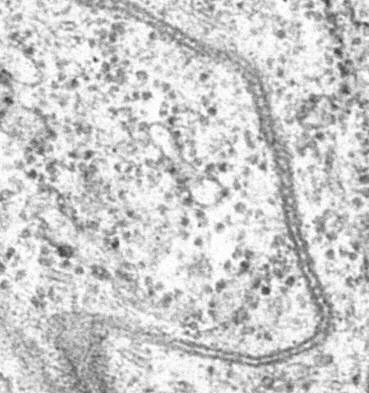

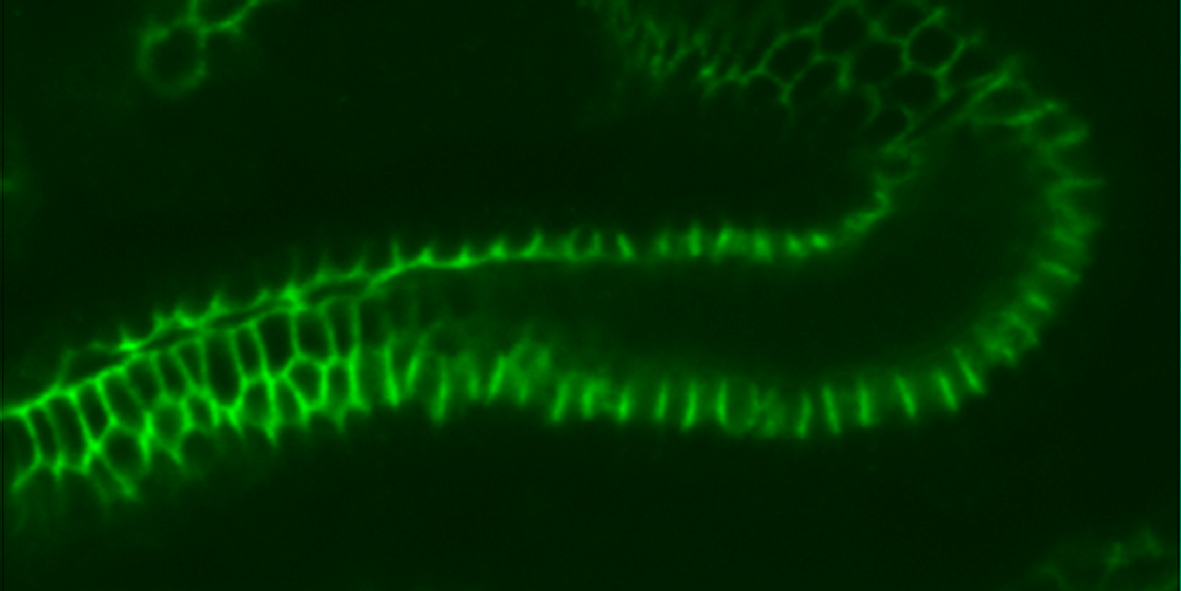
