= CLDN3 =

Protein-coding gene in humans

Identifiers
- Aliases: CLDN3, C7orf1, CPE-R2, CPETR2, HRVP1, RVP1, claudin 3
- External IDs: OMIM: 602910; MGI: 1329044; GeneCards: CLDN3

Gene location (Human)
Chr.	Chromosome 7 (human)
Band	7q11.23	Start	73,768,997 bp
Band	7q11.23	End	73,770,270 bp

Gene location (Mouse)
Chr.	Chromosome 5 (mouse)
Band	5 G2|5 74.93 cM	Start	135,015,068 bp
Band	5 G2|5 74.93 cM	End	135,016,326 bp
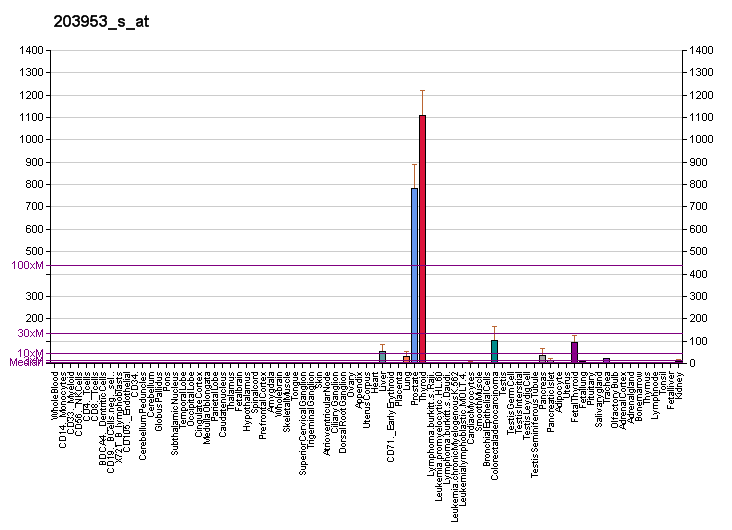

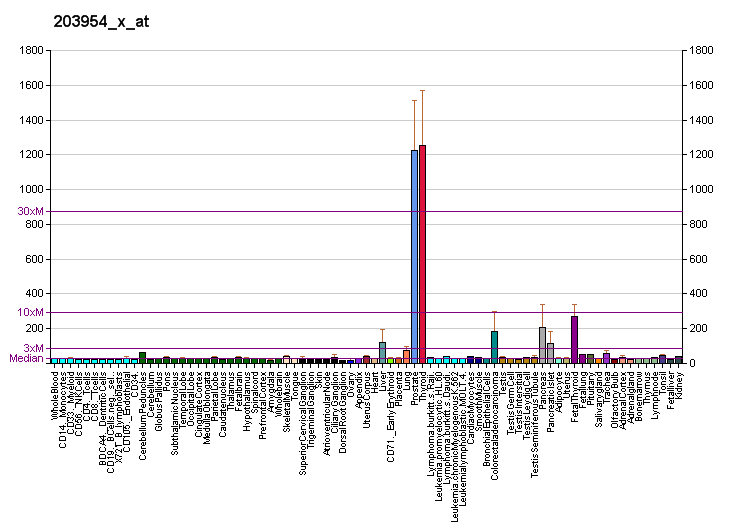
RNA expression pattern
Bgee	Human / Mouse (ortholog); Top expressed in: mucosa of transverse colon; right uterine tube; mucosa of sigmoid colon; mucosa of ileum; left lobe of thyroid gland; bronchial epithelial cell; right lobe of thyroid gland; olfactory zone of nasal mucosa; body of pancreas; jejunal mucosa / Top expressed in: large intestine; left colon; crypt of lieberkuhn of small intestine; vestibular membrane of cochlear duct; jejunum; vestibular sensory epithelium; seminal vesicula; lacrimal gland; duodenum; left lung; More reference expression data
BioGPS	More reference expression data
Gene ontology
Molecular function	transmembrane signaling receptor activity; structural molecule activity; identical protein binding
Cellular component	membrane; integral component of membrane; cell junction; apicolateral plasma membrane; plasma membrane; integral component of plasma membrane; lateral plasma membrane; bicellular tight junction; cytoplasm
Biological process	calcium-independent cell-cell adhesion via plasma membrane cell-adhesion molecules; response to hypoxia; protein homooligomerization; epithelial cell morphogenesis; protein heterooligomerization; bicellular tight junction assembly; signal transduction; response to ethanol
Sources:Amigo / QuickGO
Orthologs
Databases	NCBI: entry; OMA: entry
Species	Human	Mouse
Entrez	1365	12739
Ensembl	ENSG00000165215	ENSMUSG00000070473
UniProt	O15551	Q9Z0G9
RefSeq (mRNA)	NM_001306	NM_009902
RefSeq (protein)	NP_001297	NP_034032
Location (UCSC)	Chr 7: 73.77 – 73.77 Mb	Chr 5: 135.02 – 135.02 Mb
PubMed search
- Wikidata
View/Edit Human	View/Edit Mouse

Claudin 3, also known as CLDN3, is a protein which in humans is encoded by the CLDN3 gene. It is a member of the claudin protein family.

Tight junctions represent one mode of cell-to-cell adhesion in epithelial or endothelial cell sheets, forming continuous seals around cells and serving as a physical barrier to prevent solutes and water from passing freely through the paracellular space. These junctions are composed of sets of continuous networking strands in the outwardly facing cytoplasmic leaflet, with complementary grooves in the inwardly facing extracytoplasmic leaflet. The protein encoded by this intron-less gene, a member of the claudin family, is an integral membrane protein and a component of tight junction strands. It is also a low-affinity receptor for Clostridium perfringens enterotoxin, and shares amino acid sequence similarity with a putative apoptosis-related protein found in rat.

== Interactions ==
CLDN3 has been shown to interact with CLDN1 and CLDN5.
