= CLDN4 =

Protein-coding gene in humans

Identifiers
- Aliases: CLDN4, CPE-R, CPER, CPETR, CPETR1, WBSCR8, hCPE-R, claudin 4
- External IDs: OMIM: 602909; MGI: 1313314; GeneCards: CLDN4

Gene location (Human)
Chr.	Chromosome 7 (human)
Band	7q11.23	Start	73,799,542 bp
Band	7q11.23	End	73,832,690 bp

Gene location (Mouse)
Chr.	Chromosome 5 (mouse)
Band	5 G2|5 74.9 cM	Start	134,973,973 bp
Band	5 G2|5 74.9 cM	End	134,975,788 bp
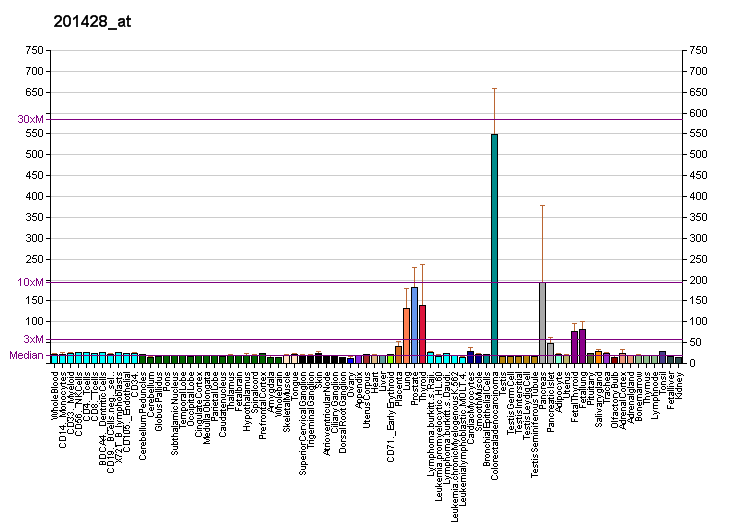
RNA expression pattern
Bgee	Human / Mouse (ortholog); Top expressed in: mucosa of transverse colon; right uterine tube; olfactory zone of nasal mucosa; skin of abdomen; skin of leg; minor salivary glands; rectum; left lobe of thyroid gland; mucosa of sigmoid colon; right lobe of thyroid gland / Top expressed in: blastocyst; transitional epithelium of urinary bladder; lip; corneal stroma; saccule; otic placode; otic vesicle; submandibular gland; esophagus; duodenum; More reference expression data
BioGPS	More reference expression data
Gene ontology
Molecular function	structural molecule activity; transmembrane signaling receptor activity; identical protein binding; chloride channel activity; protein binding
Cellular component	integral component of membrane; cell junction; basal plasma membrane; apicolateral plasma membrane; integral component of plasma membrane; apical plasma membrane; lateral plasma membrane; bicellular tight junction; membrane; plasma membrane; chloride channel complex
Biological process	response to progesterone; female pregnancy; calcium-independent cell-cell adhesion via plasma membrane cell-adhesion molecules; circadian rhythm; establishment of skin barrier; signal transduction; chloride transport; renal absorption; chloride transmembrane transport; ion transport
Sources:Amigo / QuickGO
Orthologs
Databases	NCBI: entry; OMA: entry
Species	Human	Mouse
Entrez	1364	12740
Ensembl	ENSG00000189143	ENSMUSG00000047501
UniProt	O14493	O35054
RefSeq (mRNA)	NM_001305	NM_009903
RefSeq (protein)	NP_001296	NP_034033
Location (UCSC)	Chr 7: 73.8 – 73.83 Mb	Chr 5: 134.97 – 134.98 Mb
PubMed search
- Wikidata
View/Edit Human	View/Edit Mouse

Claudin 4, also known as CLDN4, is a protein which in humans is encoded by the CLDN4 gene. It belongs to the group of claudins.

This gene encodes an integral membrane protein, which belongs to the claudin family. The protein is a component of tight junction strands and may play a role in internal organ development and function during pre- and postnatal life. This gene is deleted in Williams-Beuren syndrome, a neurodevelopmental disorder affecting multiple systems.

Claudin 4 can also be used as a marker for distinguishing malignant mesothelioma from lung cancer and uterine serous carcinoma. As a pancreatic cancer marker in cell-blocks of effusion specimens, it has also been found to have a superior performance to BerEp4 staining.
