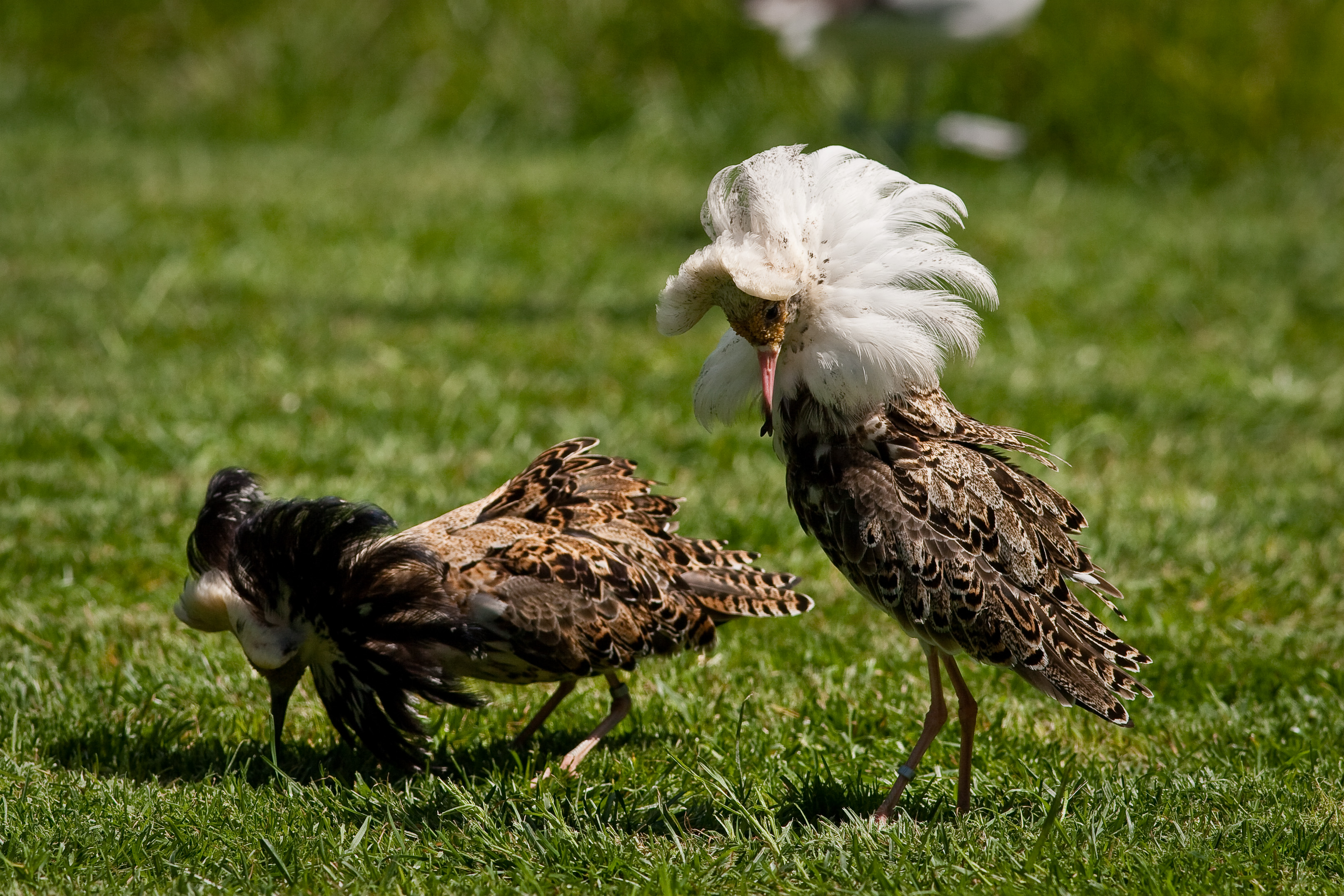
- Males in breeding plumage in Diergaarde Blijdorp, the Netherlands
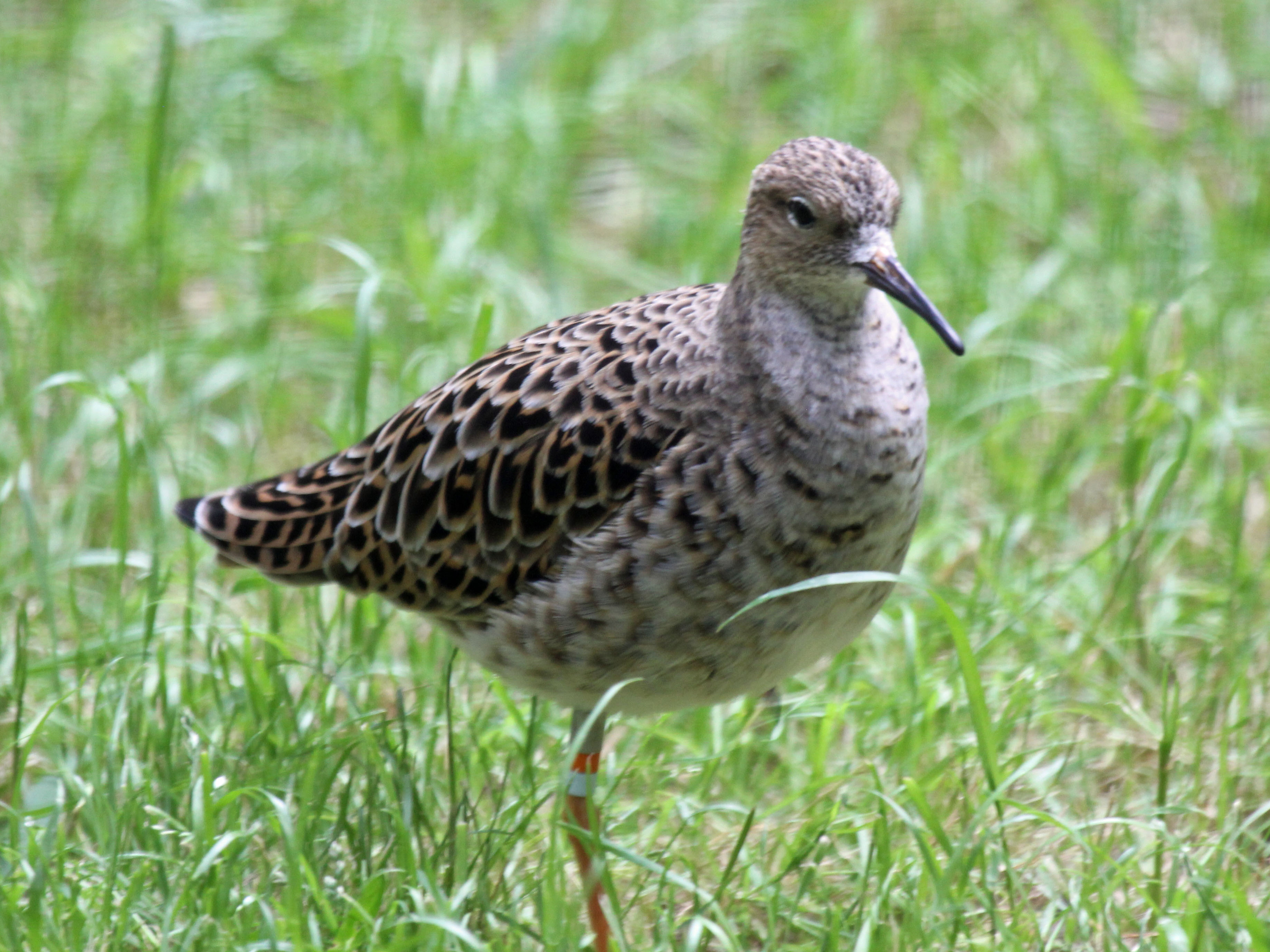
- Breeding female in North Carolina

Conservation status
- Least Concern (IUCN 3.1) (Global)

- Near Threatened (IUCN 3.1)(European)

Scientific classification
- Kingdom: Animalia
- Phylum: Chordata
- Class: Aves
- Order: Charadriiformes
- Family: Scolopacidae
- Genus: Calidris
- Species: C. pugnax

Binomial name
- Calidris pugnax (Linnaeus, 1758)
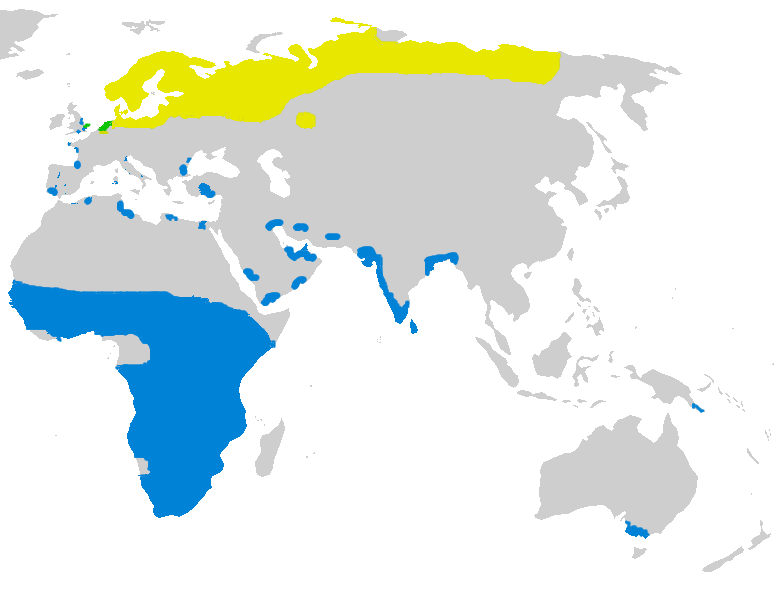
- Range of P. pugnax Breeding summer visitor Present all year Non-breeding range

Synonyms
- Philomachus pugnax (Linnaeus, 1758); Tringa pugnax Linnaeus, 1758

= Ruff (bird) =

Species of bird

The ruff (Calidris pugnax) is a medium-sized wading bird that breeds in marshes and wet meadows across northern Eurasia. This highly gregarious sandpiper is migratory and sometimes forms huge flocks in its winter grounds, which include southern and western Europe, Africa, southern Asia and Australia.

The ruff is a long-necked, pot-bellied bird. This species shows marked sexual dimorphism; the male is much larger than the female (the reeve), and has a breeding plumage that includes brightly coloured head tufts, bare orange facial skin, extensive black on the breast, and the large collar of ornamental feathers that inspired this bird's English name. The female and the non-breeding male have grey-brown upperparts and mainly white underparts. Three differently plumaged types of male, including a rare form that mimics the female, use a variety of strategies to obtain mating opportunities at a lek, and the colourful head and neck feathers are erected as part of the elaborate main courting display. The female has one brood per year and lays four eggs in a well-hidden ground nest, incubating the eggs and rearing the chicks, which are mobile soon after hatching, on her own. Predators of wader chicks and eggs include mammals such as foxes, feral cats and stoats, and birds such as large gulls, crows and skuas.

The ruff forages in wet grassland and soft mud, probing or searching by sight for edible items. It primarily feeds on insects, especially in the breeding season, but it will consume plant material, including rice and maize, on migration and in winter. Classified as "least concern" on the IUCN Red List criteria, the global conservation concerns are relatively low because of the large numbers that breed in Scandinavia and the Arctic. However, the range in much of Europe is contracting because of land drainage, increased fertiliser use, the loss of mown or grazed breeding sites, and over-hunting. This decline has seen it listed in the Agreement on the Conservation of African-Eurasian Migratory Waterbirds (AEWA).

== Taxonomy and nomenclature ==
The ruff is a wader in the large family Scolopacidae, the typical shorebirds. Recent research suggests that it is in a near-basal position in the genus Calidris, the sister taxon to all of the species except for the knot group (red knot, great knot and surfbird). It has no recognised subspecies or geographical variants.

This species was first described by Carl Linnaeus in his Systema Naturae in 1758 as Tringa pugnax. It was moved to the monotypic genus Philomachus by German naturalist Blasius Merrem in 1804. More recent DNA research has shown it fits comfortably into the wader genus Calidris. The genus name comes from the Ancient Greek kalidris or skalidris, a term used by Aristotle for some grey-coloured waterside birds. The specific epithet refers to the aggressive behaviour of the bird at its mating arenas — pugnax from the Latin term for "combative".

The original English name for this bird, dating back to at least 1465, is the ree, perhaps derived from a dialectical term meaning "frenzied"; a later name reeve, which is still used for the female, is of unknown origin, but may be derived from the shire-reeve, a feudal officer, likening the male's flamboyant plumage to the official's robes. The current name was first recorded in 1634, and is derived from the ruff, an exaggerated collar fashionable from the mid-sixteenth century to the mid-seventeenth century, since the male bird's neck ornamental feathers resemble the neck-wear.

== Description ==
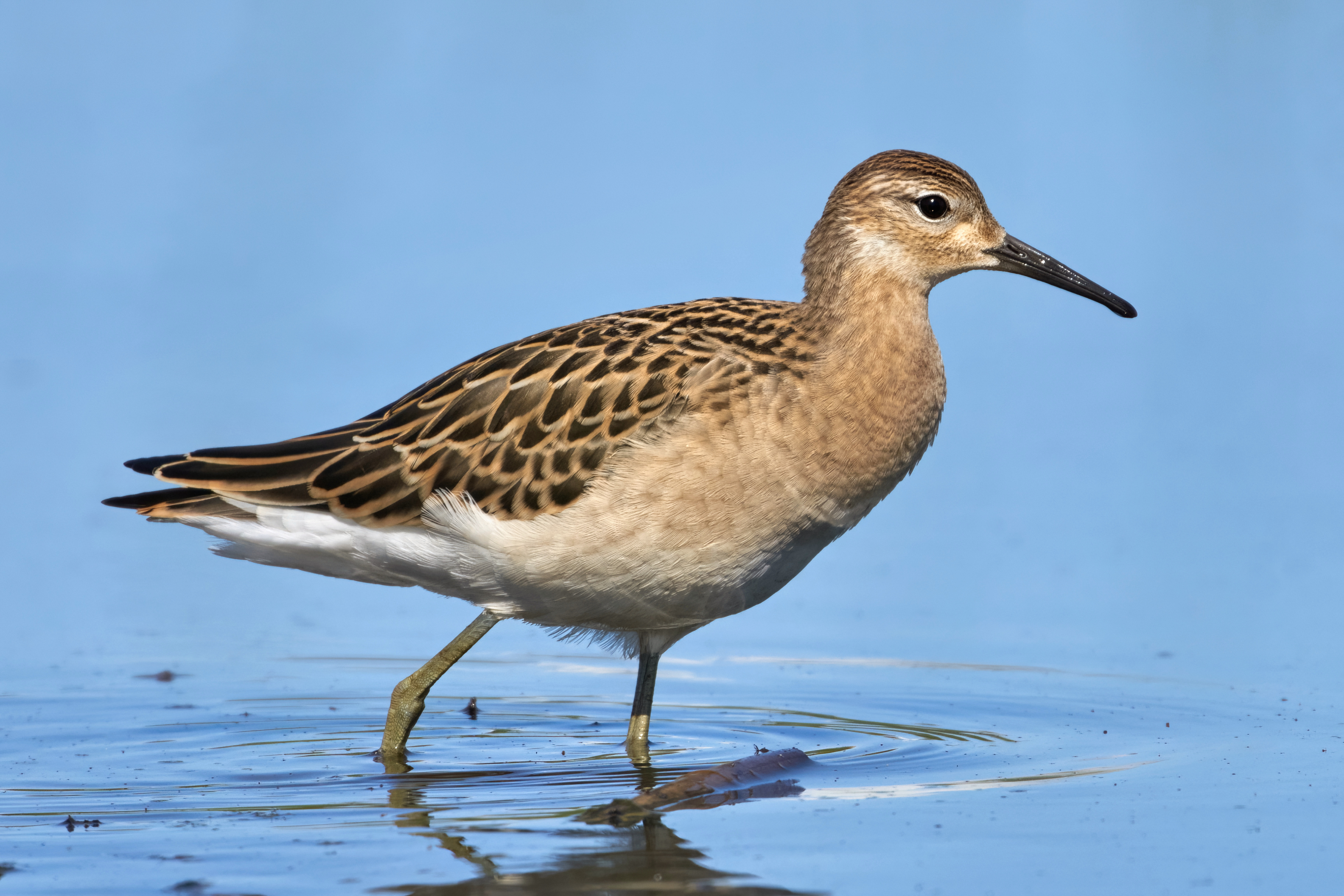
Male in juvenile plumage, St Petersburg, Russia

The ruff has a distinctive pot-bellied appearance, with a small head, medium-length bill, longish neck and heavy body. It has long legs that are variable in colour, being dark greenish in juveniles, pink to orange in adults with some males having reddish orange legs only during the breeding season. In flight, it has a deeper, slower wing stroke than other waders of a similar size, and displays a thin, indistinct white bar on the wing, and white ovals on the sides of the tail. The species shows sexual dimorphism. Although a small percentage of males resemble females, the typical male is much larger than the female and has an elaborate breeding plumage. Males are 29–32 cm (11–13 in) long with a 54–60 cm (21–24 in) wingspan, and weigh from 130–254 g (4.6–9.0 oz), the largest species in the genus Calidris. In the May-to-June breeding season, the male's legs, bill and warty bare facial skin are orange, and he has distinctive head tufts and a neck ruff. These ornaments vary on individual birds, being black, chestnut or white, with the colouring solid, barred or irregular. The grey-brown back has a scale-like pattern, often with black or chestnut feathers, and the underparts are white with extensive black on the breast. The extreme variability of the main breeding plumage is thought to have developed to aid individual recognition in a species that has communal breeding displays, but is usually mute.

Outside the breeding season, the male's head and neck decorations and the bare facial skin are lost and the legs and bill become duller. The upperparts are grey-brown, and the underparts are white with grey mottling on the breast and flanks.

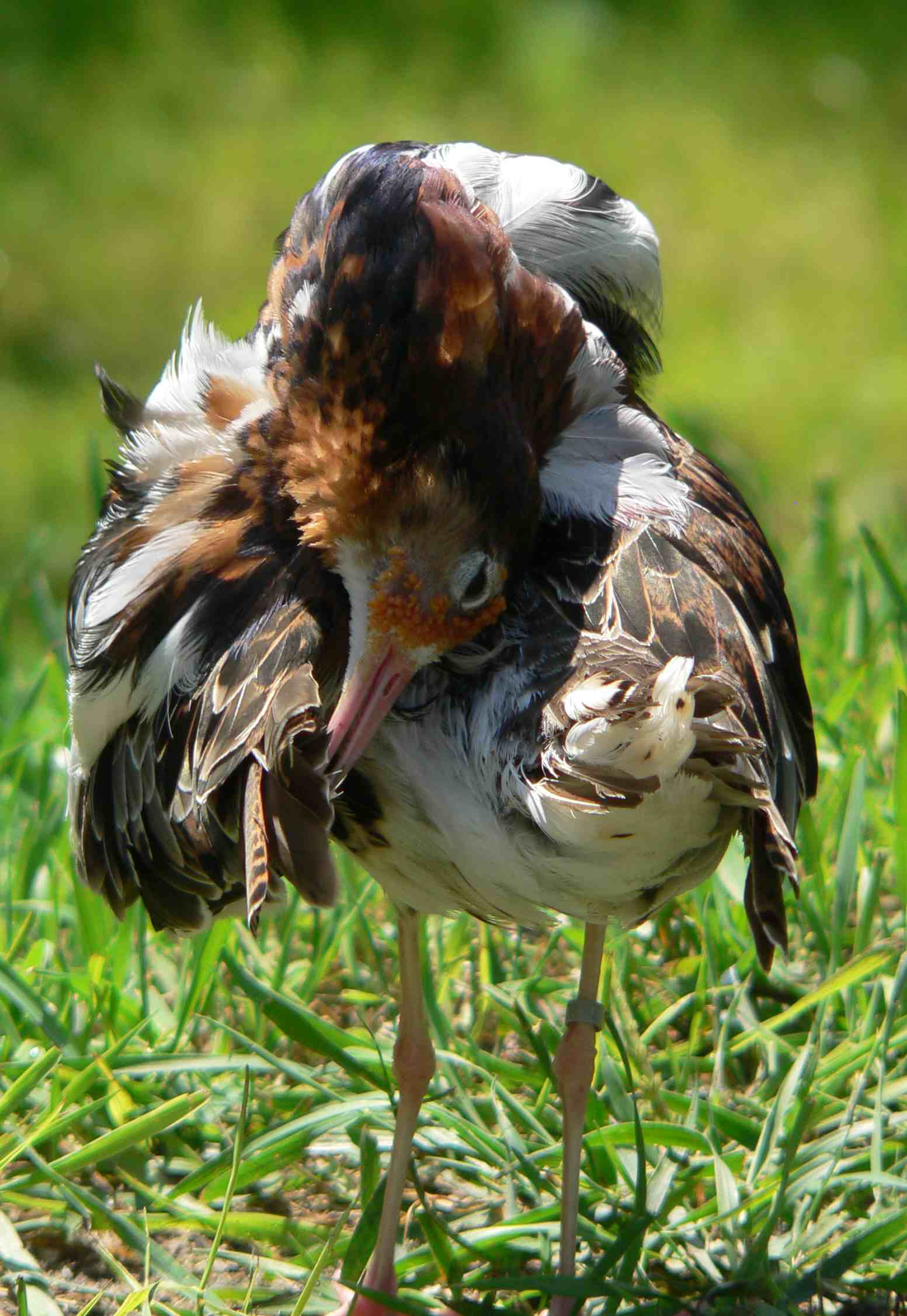
Territorial male in breeding plumage

Females, or "reeve", are 22–26 cm (8.7–10.2 in) long with a 46–49 cm (18–19 in) wingspan, and weighs from 70–170 g (2.5–6.0 oz). In breeding plumage, they have grey-brown upperparts with white-fringed, dark-centred feathers. The breast and flanks are variably blotched with black. In winter, the females' plumage is similar to that of the male, but the sexes are distinguishable by their size. The plumage of the juveniles resembles the non-breeding adult, but has upperparts with a neat, scale-like pattern with dark feather centres, and a strong buff tinge to the underparts.

Adult male ruffs start to moult into the main display plumage before their return to the breeding areas, and the proportion of birds with head and neck decorations gradually increases through the spring. Second-year birds lag behind full adults in developing breeding plumage. They have a lower body weight and a slower weight increase than full adults, and perhaps the demands made on their energy reserves during the migration flight are the main reason of the delayed moult.

Ruffs of both sexes have an additional moult stage between the winter and final summer plumages, a phenomenon also seen in the bar-tailed godwit. Before developing the full display finery with coloured ruff and tufts, the males replace part of their winter plumage with striped feathers. Females also develop a mix of winter and striped feathers before reaching their summer appearance. The final male breeding plumage results from the replacement of both winter and striped feathers, but the female retains the striped feathers and replaces only the winter feathers to reach her summer plumage. The striped prebreeding plumages may represent the original breeding appearance of this species, the male's showy courtship feathers evolving later under strong sexual selection pressures.

Adult males and most adult females start their pre-winter moult before returning south, but complete most feather replacement on the wintering grounds. In Kenya, males moult 3–4 weeks ahead of the females, finishing before December, whereas females typically complete feather replacement during December and early January. Juveniles moult from their first summer body plumage into winter plumage during late September to November, and later undergo a pre-breeding moult similar in timing and duration to that of the adults, and often producing as brightly coloured an appearance.

Two other waders can be confused with the ruff. The juvenile sharp-tailed sandpiper is a little smaller than a juvenile female ruff and has a similar rich orange-buff breast, but the ruff is slimmer with a longer neck and legs, a rounder head, and a much plainer face. The buff-breasted sandpiper also resembles a small juvenile ruff, but even the female ruff is noticeably larger than the sandpiper, with a longer bill, more rotund body and scaly-patterned upperparts.

== Distribution and habitat ==
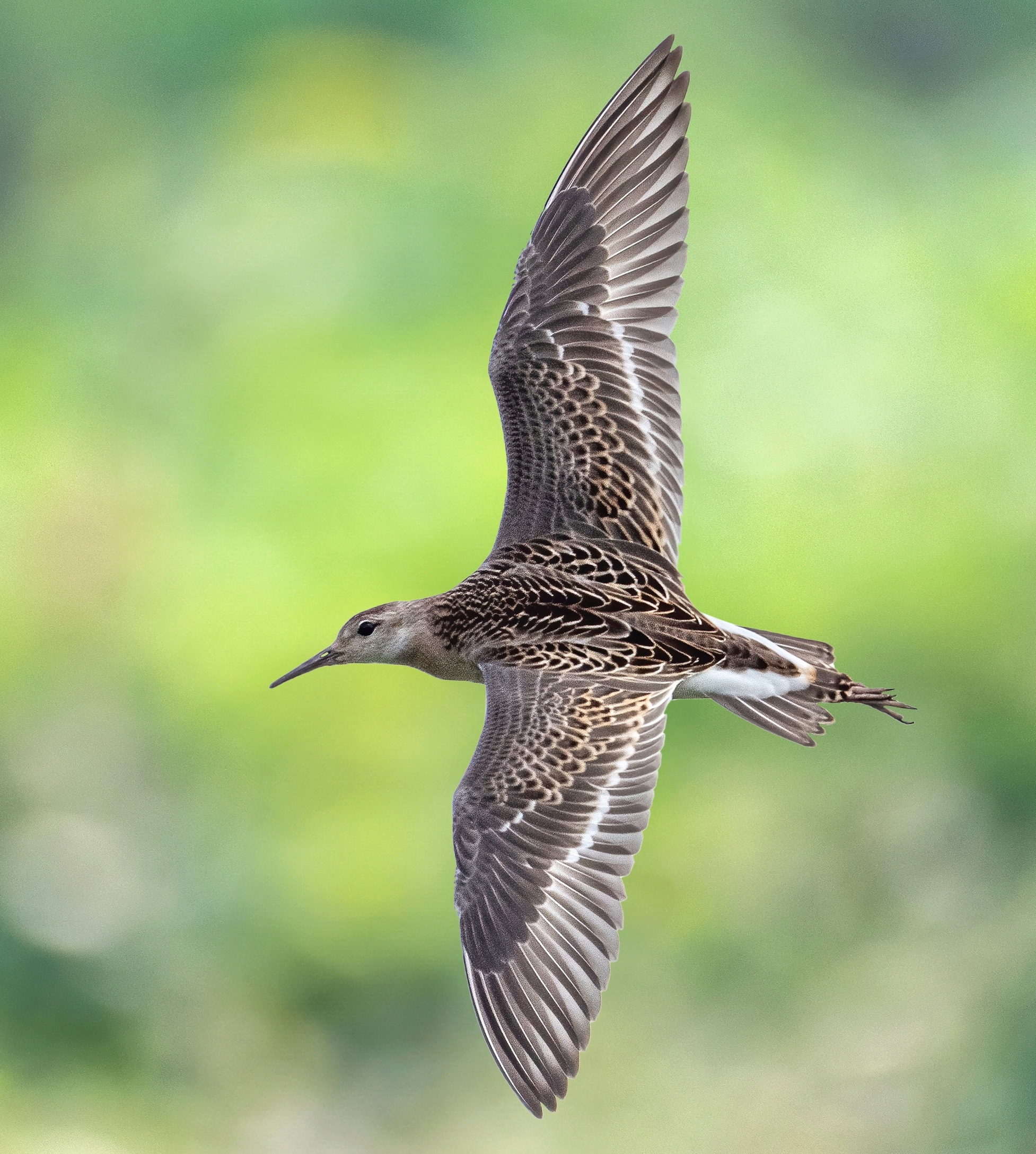
Ruff in flight, showing the white sides to the rump and the narrow white wingbar; Nepal

The ruff is a migratory species, breeding in wetlands in colder regions of northern Eurasia, and spends the northern winter in the tropics, mainly in Africa. Some Siberian breeders undertake an annual round trip of up to 30,000 km (19,000 mi) to the West African wintering grounds. There is a limited overlap of the summer and winter ranges in western Europe. The ruff breeds in extensive lowland freshwater marshes and damp grasslands. It avoids barren tundra and areas badly affected by severe weather, preferring hummocky marshes and deltas with shallow water. The wetter areas provide a source of food, the mounds and slopes may be used for leks, and dry areas with sedge or low scrub offer nesting sites. A Hungarian study showed that moderately intensive grazing of grassland, with more than one cow per hectare (2.5 acres), was found to attract more nesting pairs. When not breeding, the birds use a wider range of shallow wetlands, such as irrigated fields, lake margins, and mining subsidence and other floodlands. Dry grassland, tidal mudflats and the seashore are less frequently used. The density can reach 129 individuals per square kilometre (334 per square mile), but is usually much lower.

The ruff breeds in Europe and Asia from Scandinavia and Great Britain almost to the Pacific. In Europe it is found in cool temperate areas, but over its Russian range it is an Arctic species, occurring mainly north of about 65°N. The largest numbers breed in Russia (more than 1 million pairs), Sweden (61,000 pairs), Finland (39,000 pairs) and Norway (14,000 pairs). Although it also breeds from Britain east through the Low Countries to Poland, Germany and Denmark, there are fewer than 2,000 pairs in these more southerly areas.

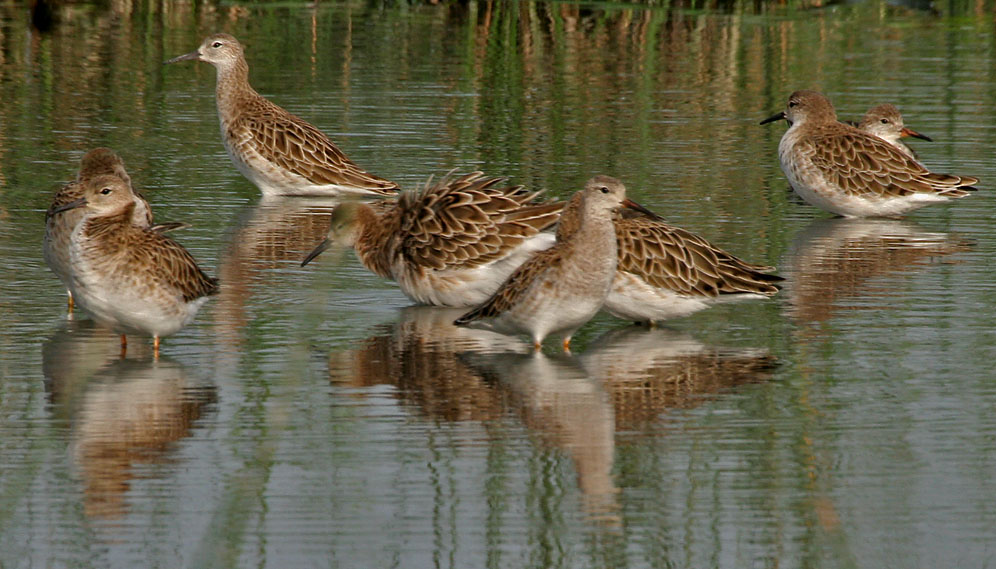
Wintering in India

It is highly gregarious on migration, travelling in large flocks that can contain hundreds or thousands of individuals. Huge dense groups form on the wintering grounds; one flock in Senegal contained a million birds. A minority winter further east to Burma, south China, New Guinea and scattered parts of southern Australia, or on the Atlantic and Mediterranean coasts of Europe. In Great Britain and parts of coastal western Europe, where the breeding and wintering ranges overlap, birds may be present throughout the year. Non-breeding birds may also remain year round in the tropical wintering quarters. The Ruff is an uncommon visitor to Alaska (where it has occasionally bred), Canada and the contiguous states of the US, and has wandered to Iceland, Middle America, northern South America, Madagascar and New Zealand. It has been recorded as breeding well south of its main range in northern Kazakhstan, a major migration stopover area.

The male, which plays no part in nesting or chick care, leaves the breeding grounds in late June or early July, followed later in July by the female and juveniles. Males typically make shorter flights and winter further north than females; for example, virtually all wintering ruffs in Britain are males, whereas in Kenya most are females. Many migratory species use this differential wintering strategy, since it reduces feeding competition between the sexes and enables territorial males to reach the breeding grounds as early as possible, improving their chances of successful mating. Male ruffs may also be able to tolerate colder winter conditions because they are larger than females.

Birds returning north in spring across the central Mediterranean appear to follow a well-defined route. Large concentrations of ruffs form every year at particular stopover sites to feed, and individuals marked with rings or dye reappear in subsequent years. The refuelling sites are closer together than the theoretical maximum travel distance calculated from the mean body weight, and provide evidence of a migration strategy using favoured intermediate sites. The ruff stores fat as a fuel, but unlike mammals, uses lipids as the main energy source for exercise (including migration) and, when necessary, keeps warm by shivering; however, little research has been conducted on the mechanisms by which they oxidise lipids.

== Behaviour ==
=== Mating ===
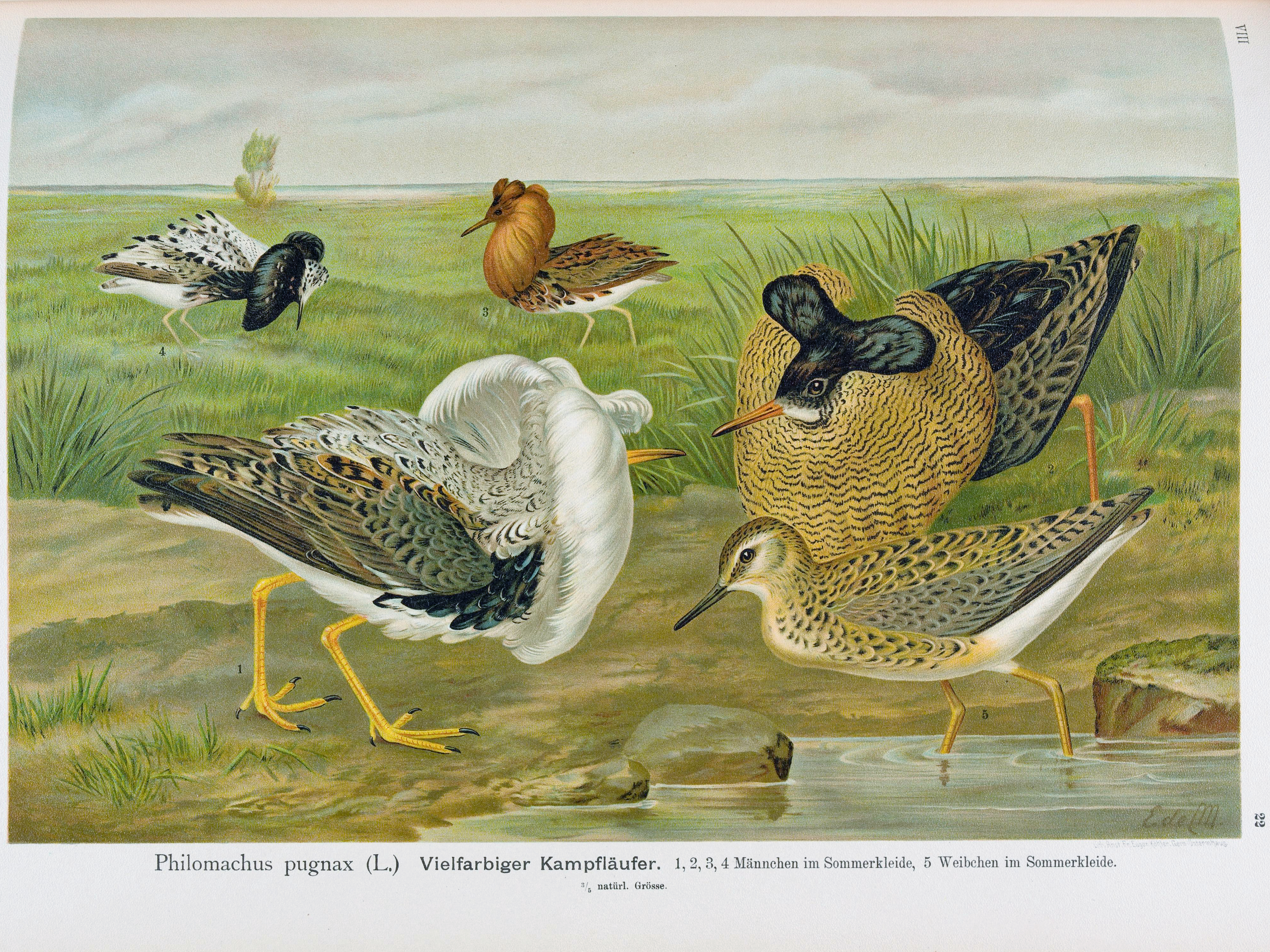
Illustration of a lek by Johann Friedrich Naumann (1780–1857)

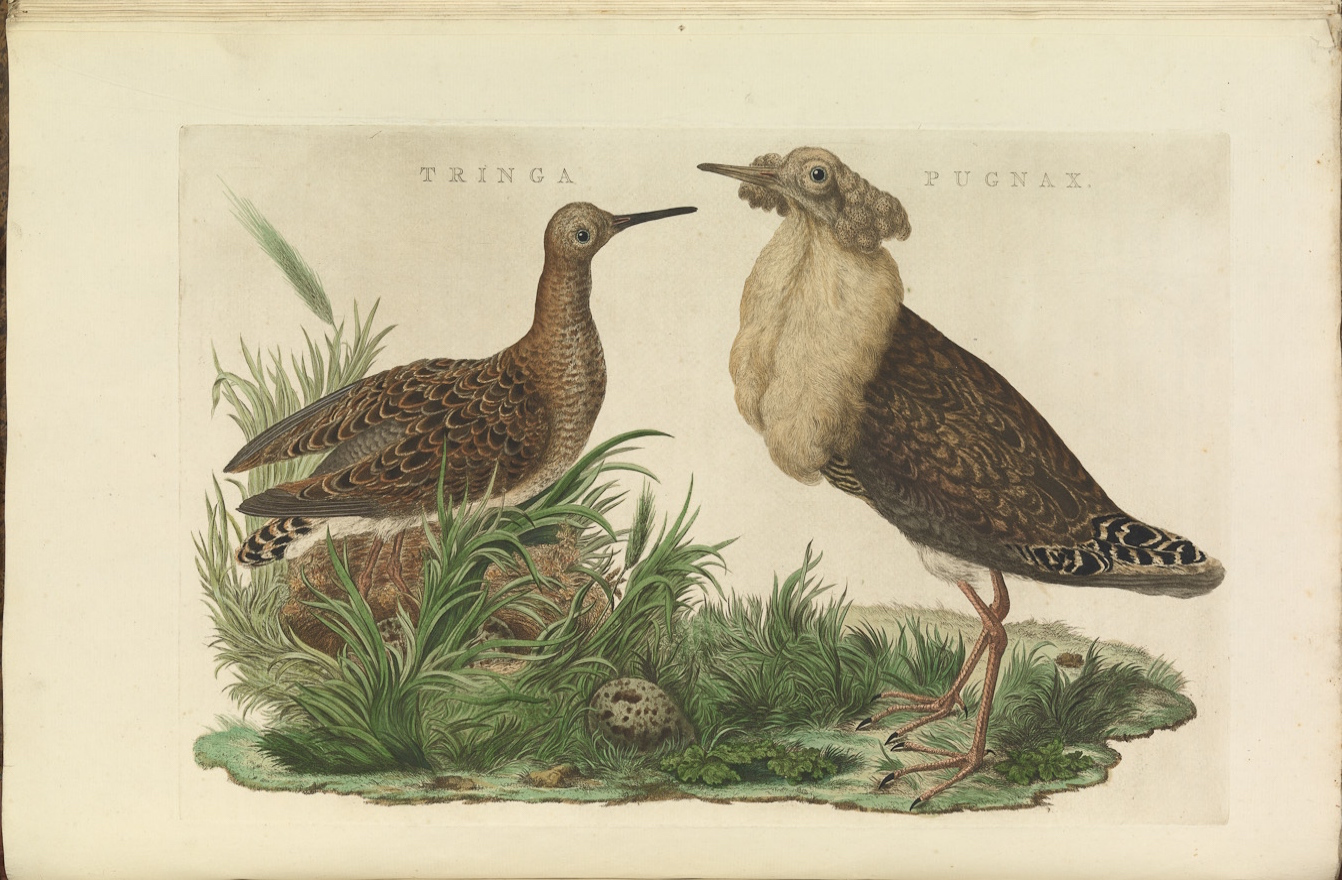
Ruff in Nederlandsche Vogelen, Vol. 1 (1770)

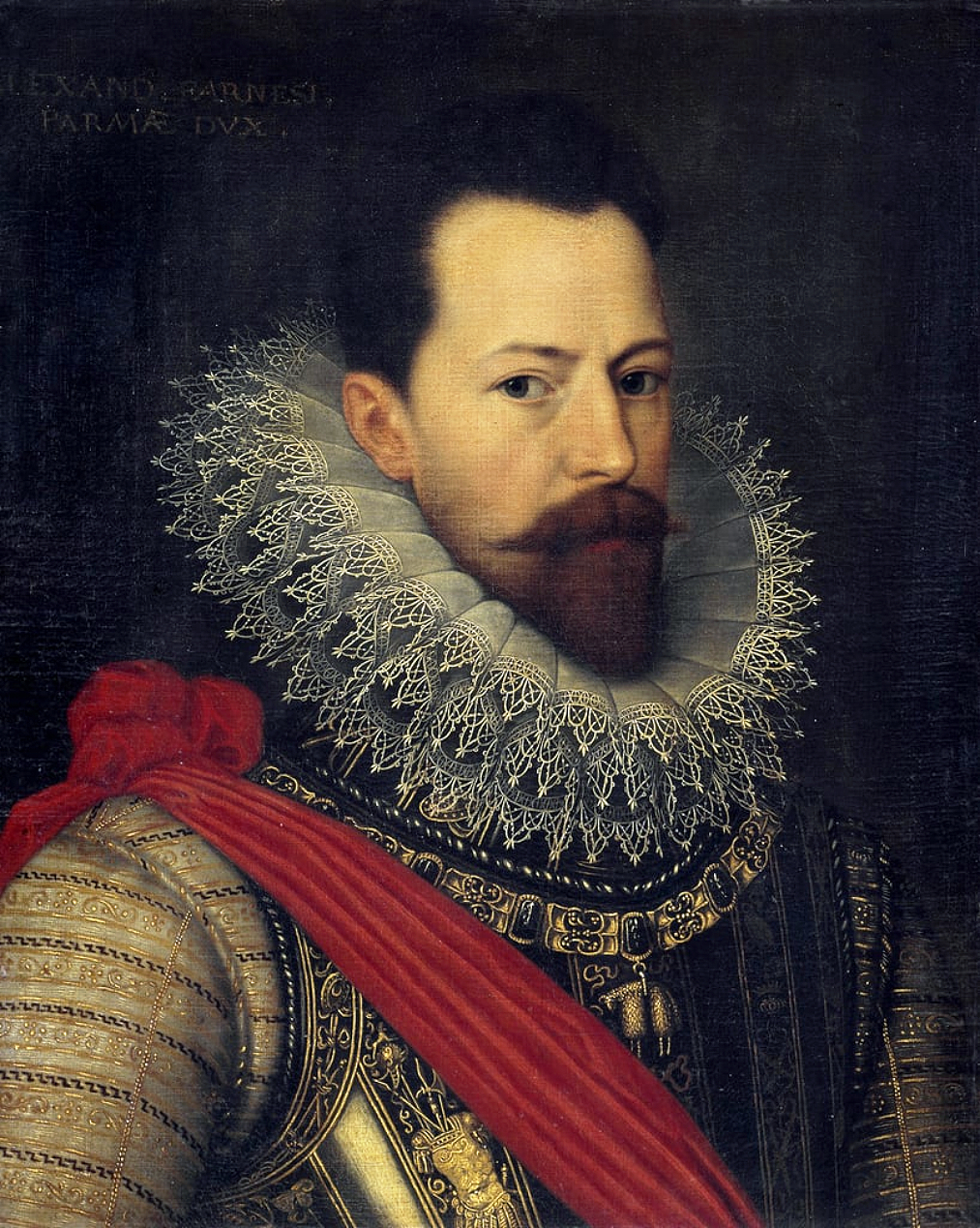
Otto van Veen's sixteenth-century painting of Alexander Farnese, Duke of Parma wearing a ruff, the decorative collar from which the English name of the bird is derived.

Males display during the breeding season at a lek in a traditional open grassy arena. The ruff is one of the few lekking species in which the display is primarily directed at other males rather than to the females, and it is among the small percentage of birds in which the males have well-marked and inherited variations in plumage and mating behaviour. There are three male forms: the typical territorial males, satellite males which have a white neck ruff, and a very rare variant with female-like plumage. The behaviour and appearance for an individual male remain constant through its adult life, and are determined by its genes (see §Biology of variation among males).

The territorial males, about 84% of the total, have strongly coloured black or chestnut ruffs and stake out and occupy small mating territories in the lek. They actively court females and display a high degree of aggression towards other resident males; 5–20 territorial males each hold an area of the lek about 1 m (1.1 yd) across, usually with bare soil in the centre. They perform an elaborate display that includes wing fluttering, jumping, standing upright, crouching with ruff erect, or lunging at rivals. They are typically silent even when displaying, although a soft gue-gue-gue may occasionally be given.

Territorial males are very site-faithful; 90% return to the same lekking sites in subsequent seasons, the most dominant males being the most likely to reappear. Site-faithful males can acquire accurate information about the competitive abilities of other males, leading to well-developed dominance relationships. Such stable relationships reduce conflict and the risk of injury, and the consequent lower levels of male aggression are less likely to scare off females. Lower-ranked territorial males also benefit from site fidelity since they can remain on the leks while waiting for the top males eventually to drop out.

Satellite males, about 16% of the total number, have white or mottled ruffs and do not occupy territories; they enter leks and attempt to mate with the females visiting the territories occupied by the resident males. Resident males tolerate the satellite birds because, although they are competitors for mating with the females, the presence of both types of male on a territory attracts additional females. Females also prefer larger leks, and leks surrounded by taller plants, which give better nesting habitat.

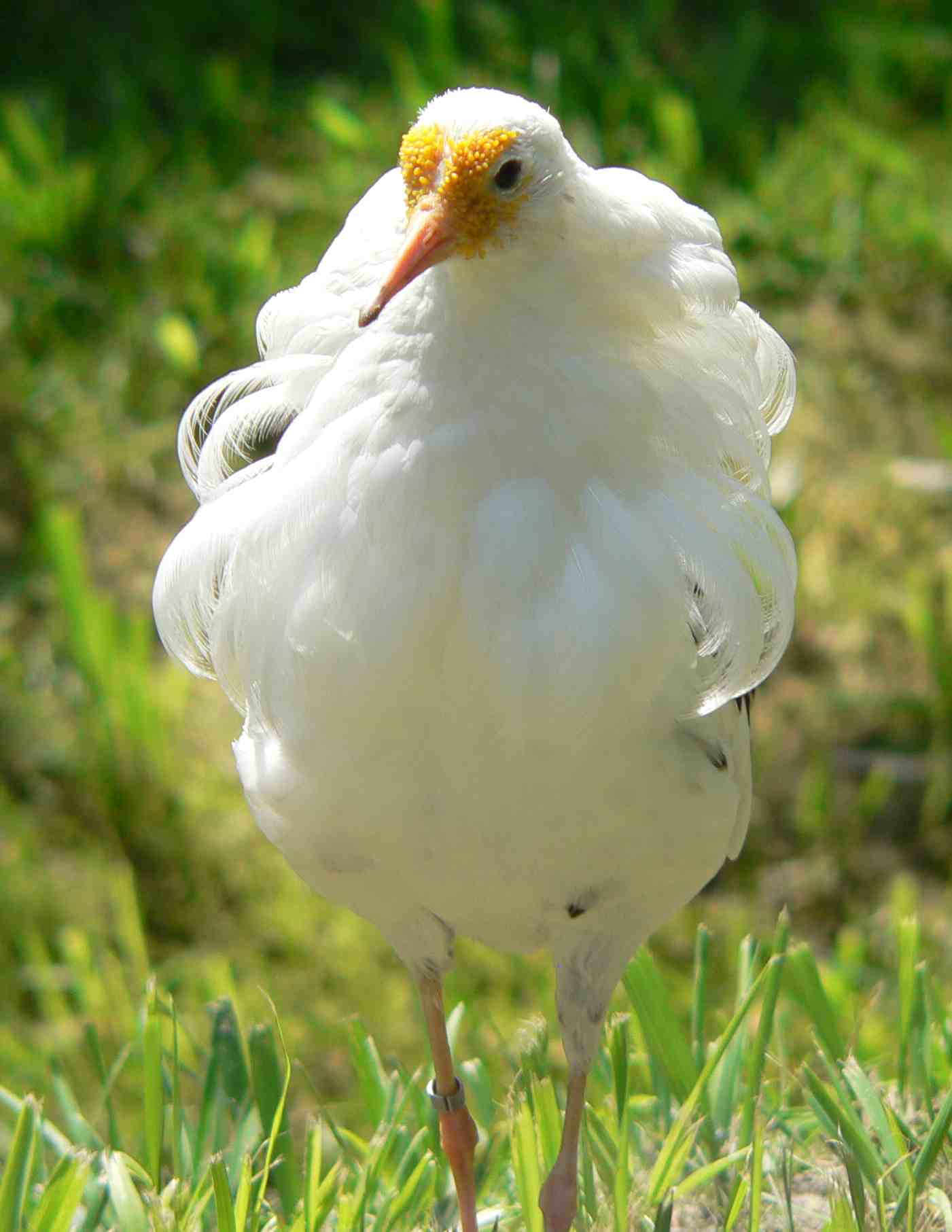
Satellite male with white ruff

Although satellite males are on average slightly smaller and lighter than residents, the nutrition of the chicks does not, as previously thought, influence mating strategy; rather, the inherited mating strategy influences body size. Resident-type chicks will, if provided with the same amount of food, grow heavier than satellite-type chicks. Satellite males do not have to expend energy to defend a territory, and can spend more time foraging, so they do not need to be as bulky as the residents; indeed, since they fly more, there would be a physiological cost to additional weight.

A third type of male was first described in 2006; this is a permanent female mimic, or "faeder" (Old English "father"), the first such reported for a bird. About 1% of males are small, intermediate in size between males and females, and do not grow the elaborate breeding plumage of the territorial and satellite males, although they have much larger internal testes than the ruffed males. Although the males of most lekking bird species have relatively small testes for their size, male ruffs have the most disproportionately large testes of any bird.

These cryptic males obtains access to mating territories together with the females, and "steals" matings when the females crouch to solicit copulation. The faeder moults into the prebreeding male plumage with striped feathers, but does not go on to develop the ornamental feathers of the more common males. As described above, this stage is thought to show the original male breeding plumage, before other male types evolved. A faeder can be distinguished in the hand by its wing length, which is intermediate between those of displaying males and females. Despite their feminine appearance, the faeders migrate with the larger lekking males and spend the winter with them. The faeders are sometimes mounted by independent or satellite males, but are as often "on top" in homosexual mountings as the ruffed males, suggesting that their true identity is known by the other males. Females never mount males. Females often seem to prefer mating with faeders to copulation with the more common males, and those males also copulate with faeders (and vice versa) relatively more often than with females. The homosexual copulations may attract females to the lek, like the presence of satellite males.

Not all mating takes place at the lek, since only a minority of the males attend an active lek. As alternative strategies, males can also directly pursue females ("following") or wait for them as they approached good feeding sites ("intercepting"). Males switched between the three tactics, being more likely to attend a lek when the copulation rate the previous day was high or when fewer females were available after nesting had started. Lekking rates were low in cold weather early in the season when off-lek males spent most of their time feeding.

The level of polyandry in the ruff is the highest known for any avian lekking species and for any shorebird. More than half of female ruffs mate with, and have clutches fertilised by, more than one male, and individual females mate with males of both main behavioural morphs more often than expected by chance. In lekking species, females can choose mates without risking the loss of support from males in nesting and rearing chicks, since the males take no part in raising the brood anyway. In the absence of this cost, if polyandry is advantageous, it would be expected to occur at a higher rate in lekking than among pair-bonded species.

=== Genetics of variation among males ===
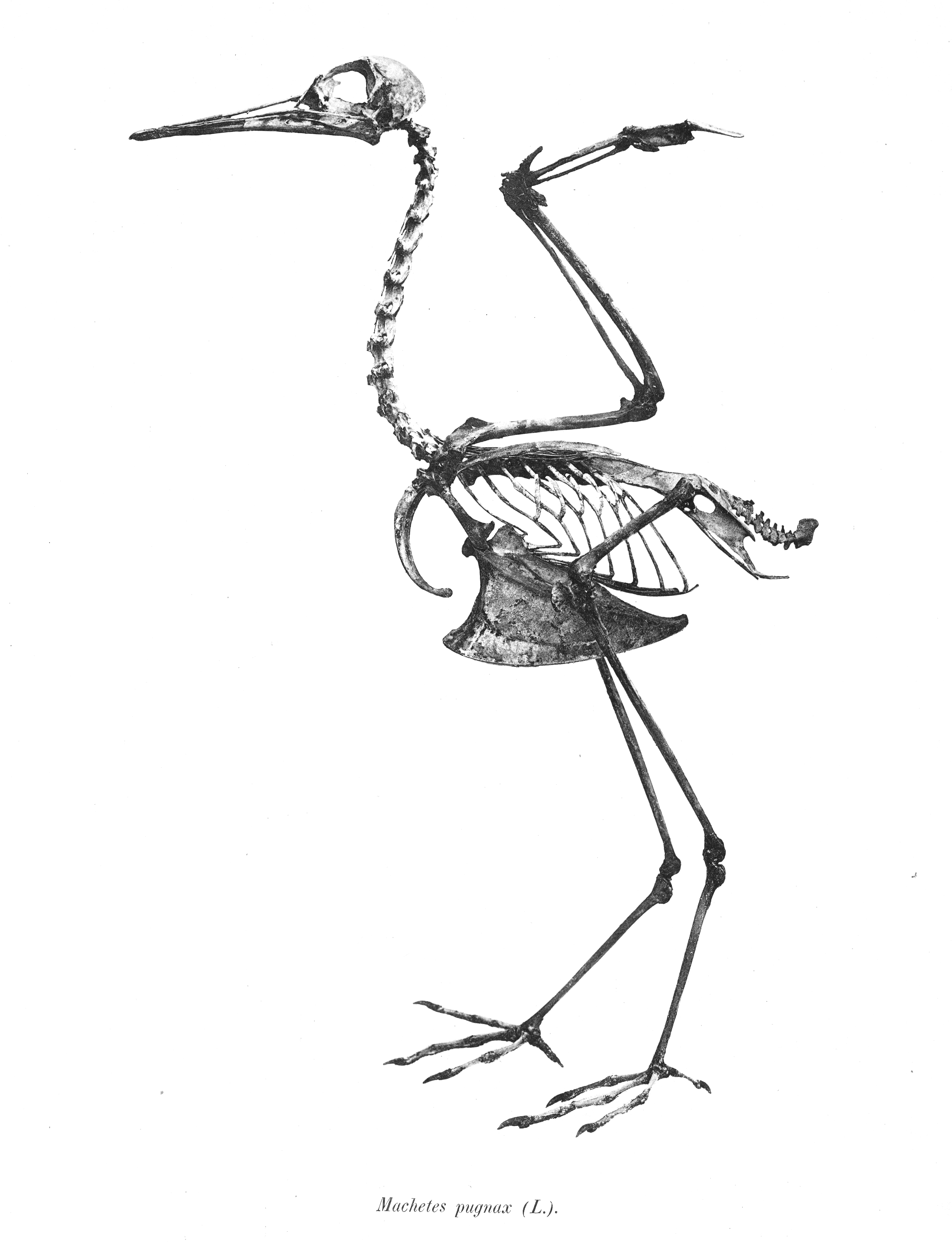
Skeleton of a ruff

As indicated above, the ruff has three male forms, which differ in mating behaviour and in appearance: the typical territorial males which have a dark neck ruff, satellite males which have a white neck ruff, and the very rare cryptic males known as "faeders" which have female-like plumage. The behaviour and appearance of each individual male remain constant through its adult life, and are determined by a simple genetic polymorphism. Territorial behaviour and appearance is recessive to satellite behaviour and appearance, while preliminary research results suggest that the faeder characteristics are genetically controlled by a single dominant gene. It was originally thought that the difference between territorial and satellite males was due to a sex-linked genetic factor, but in fact the genetic locus relevant for the mating strategy is located on an autosome, or non-sex chromosome. That means that both sexes can carry the two different forms of the gene, not just males. The female does not normally show evidence of her genetic type, but when females are given testosterone implants, they display the male behaviour corresponding to their genotype. This testosterone-linked behaviour is unusual in birds, where external sexual characteristics are normally determined by the presence or absence of oestrogen.

In 2016, two studies further pinpointed the responsible region to chromosome 11 and a 4.5-Mb covering chromosomal rearrangement. The scientists were able to show that the first genetic change happened 3.8 million years ago on the resident chromosome, when a part of it broke off and was reintroduced in the wrong direction. This inversion created the faeder allele. About 500,000 years ago another rare recombination event of faeder and resident allele in the very same inverted region led to the satellite allele. The 4.5 Mb inversion covers 90 genes, one of them is the centromere coding gene N- CENPN-, which is located exactly at one of the inversion breakpoints. The inactivation of the gene has severe deleterious effects and pedigree data of a captive ruff colony suggests that the inversion is homozygous lethal. Over the course of the past 3.8 million years, further mutations have accumulated within the inversion i.e. three deletions ranging from 3.3 to 17.6 kb. Two of these deletions remove evolutionary highly conserved elements close to two genes- HSD17B2 and SDR42E1-both holding important roles in metabolism of steroid hormones. Hormone measurements around mating time showed that whereas residents have a sharp increase of testosterone, faeders and satellites only experience higher androstenedione levels, a substance which is considered an intermediate in testosterone biosynthesis. The authors conclude that one or more of the deletions act as a cis-acting regulatory mutation which is altering the expression of one or both genes and eventually contributes to the different male phenotypes and behaviour.

=== Nesting and survival ===
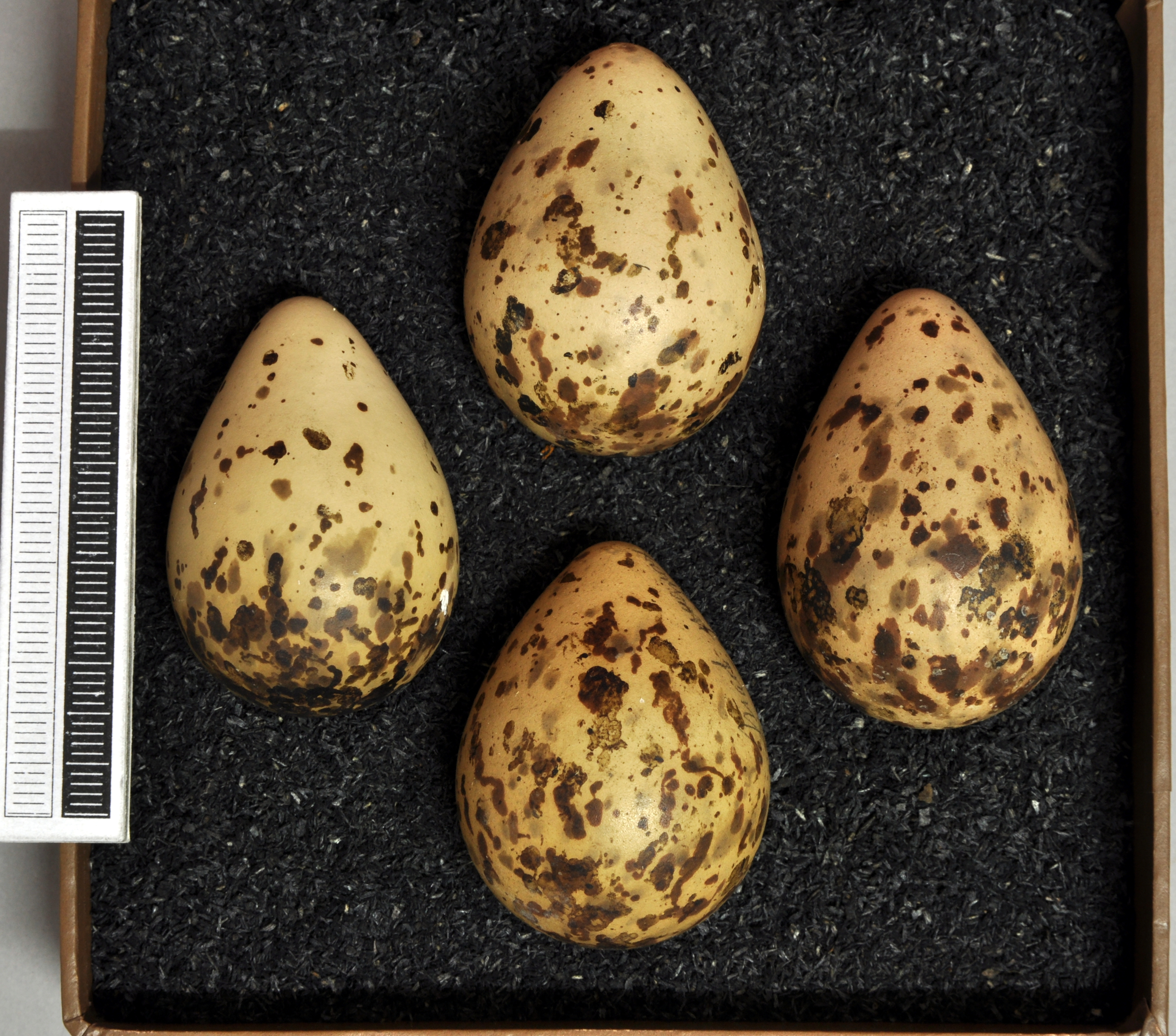
Eggs, Collection Museum Wiesbaden

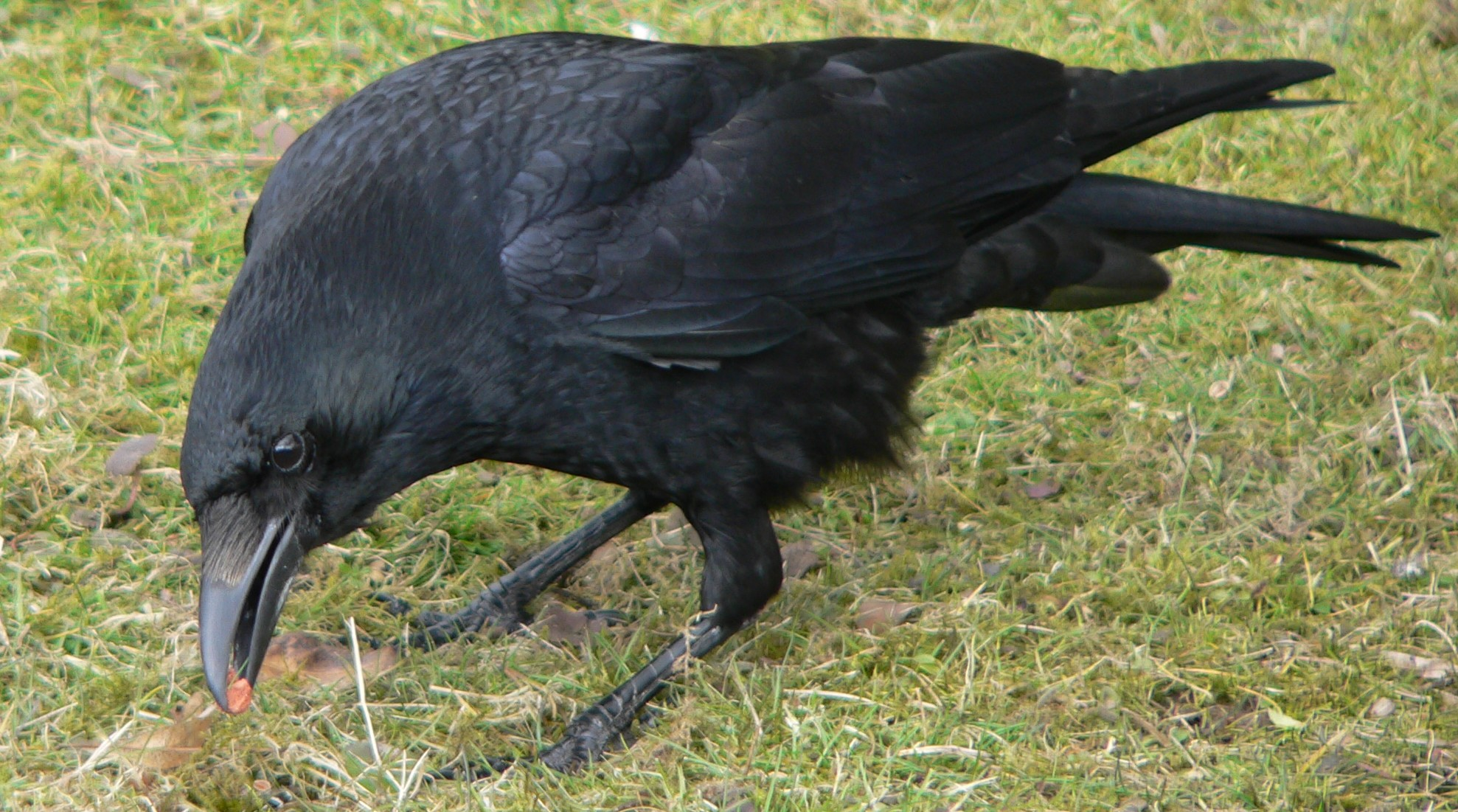
The carrion crow will raid the nests of wetland waders for eggs and young.

The nest is a shallow ground scrape lined with grass leaves and stems, and concealed in marsh plants or tall grass up to 400 m (440 yd) from the lek. Nesting is solitary, although several females may lay in the general vicinity of a lek. The eggs are slightly glossy, green or olive, and marked with dark blotches; they are laid from mid-March to early June depending on latitude.

The typical clutch is four eggs, each egg measuring 44 mm × 31 mm (1.7 in × 1.2 in) in size and weighing 21.0 g (0.74 oz) of which 5% is shell. Incubation is by the female alone, and the time to hatching is 20–23 days, with a further 25–28 days to fledging. The precocial chicks have buff and chestnut down, streaked and barred with black, and frosted with white; they feed themselves on a variety of small invertebrates, but are brooded by the female. One brood is raised each year.

Ruffs often show a pronounced inequality in the numbers of each sex. A study of juveniles in Finland found that only 34% were males and 1% were faeders. It appears that females produce a larger proportion of females at the egg stage when they are in poor physical condition. When females are in better condition, any bias in the sex ratio is smaller or absent.

Predators of waders breeding in wet grasslands include birds such as large gulls, common raven, carrion and hooded crows, and great and Arctic skuas; foxes occasionally take waders, and the impact of feral cats and stoats is unknown. Overgrazing can increase predation by making nests easier to find. In captivity, the main causes of chick mortality were stress-related sudden death and twisted neck syndrome. Adults seem to show little evidence of external parasites, but may have significant levels of disease on their tropical wintering grounds, including avian malaria in their inland freshwater habitats, and so they might be expected to invest strongly in their immune systems; however, a 2006 study that analysed the blood of migrating ruffs intercepted in Friesland showed that this bird actually has unexplained low levels of immune responses on at least one measure of resistance. The ruff can breed from its second year, and the average lifespan for birds that have passed the chick stage is about 4.4 years.

=== Feeding ===
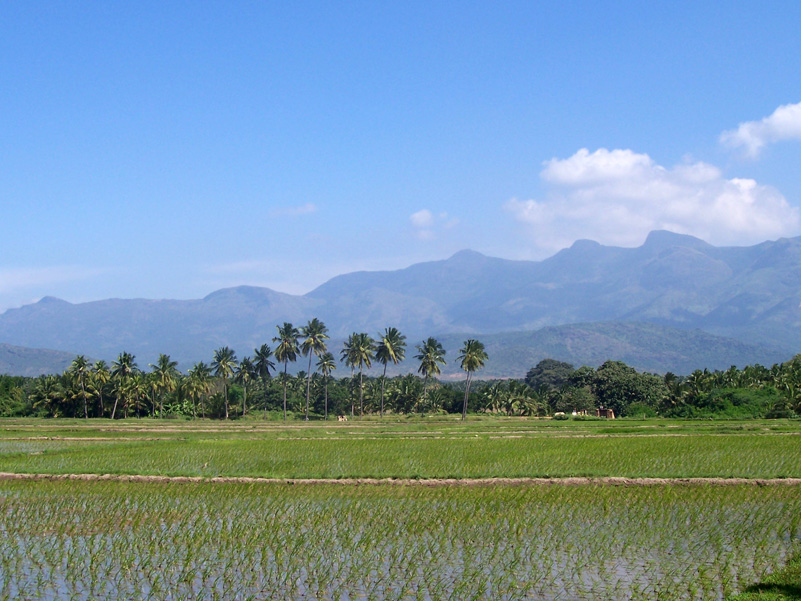
Rice paddies are a favoured winter feeding ground

The ruff normally feeds using a steady walk and pecking action, selecting food items by sight, but it will also wade deeply and submerge its head. On saline lakes in East Africa it often swims like a phalarope, picking items off the surface. It will feed at night as well as during the day. It is thought that Ruff use both visual and auditory cues to find prey. When feeding, the ruff frequently raises its back feathers, producing a loose pointed peak on the back; this habit is shared only by the black-tailed godwit. During the breeding season, the ruff's diet consists almost exclusively of the adults and larva of terrestrial and aquatic insects such as beetles and flies. On migration and during the winter, the ruff eats insects (including caddisflies, water-beetles, mayflies and grasshoppers), crustaceans, spiders, molluscs, worms, frogs, small fish, and also the seeds of rice and other cereals, sedges, grasses and aquatic plants. Migrating birds in Italy varied their diet according to what was available at each stopover site. Green aquatic plant material, spilt rice and maize, flies and beetles were found, along with varying amounts of grit. On the main wintering grounds in West Africa, rice is a favoured food during the later part of the season as the ricefields dry out.

Just before migration, the ruff increases its body weight at a rate of about 1% a day, much slower than the bar-tailed godwits breeding in Alaska, which fatten at four times that rate. This is thought to be because the godwit cannot use refuelling areas to feed on its trans-Pacific flight, whereas the ruff is able to make regular stops and take in food during overland migration. For the same reason, the ruff does not physiologically shrink its digestive organs to reduce bodyweight before migrating, unlike the godwit.

== Relationship with humans ==
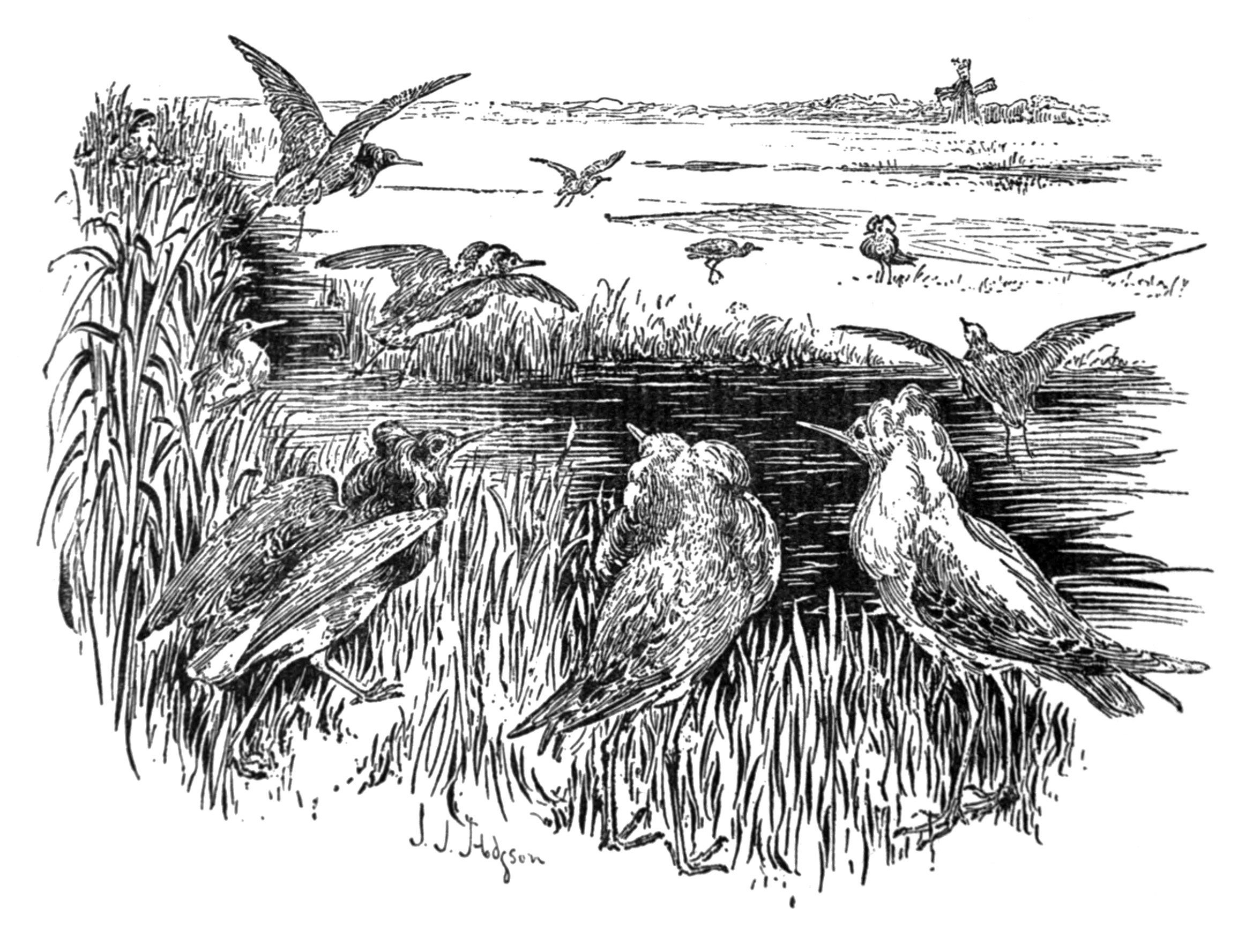
1897 illustration of ruffs being trapped for food with a net

Ruffs were formerly trapped for food in England in large numbers; on one occasion, 2,400 were served at Archbishop Neville's enthronement banquet in 1465. The birds were netted while lekking, sometimes being fattened with bread, milk and seed in holding pens before preparation for the table.

...if expedition is required, sugar is added, which will make them in a fortnight's time a lump of fat: they then sell for two Shillings or half-a-crown a piece… The method of killing them is by cutting off their head with a pair of scissars [sic], the quantity of blood that issues is very great, considering the size of the bird. They are dressed like the Woodcock, with their intestines; and, when killed at the critical time, say the Epicures, are reckoned the most delicious of all morsels.

The heavy toll on breeding birds, together with loss of habitat through drainage and collection by nineteenth-century trophy hunters and egg collectors, meant that the species became almost extinct in England by the 1880s, although recolonisation in small numbers has occurred since 1963. The draining of wetlands from the 1800s onwards in southern Sweden has resulted in the ruff's disappearance from many areas there, although it remains common in the north of the country. The use of insecticides and draining of wetlands has led to a decrease in the number of ruff in Denmark since the early 1900s. There are still areas where the ruff and other wetland birds are hunted legally or otherwise for food. A large-scale example is the capture of more than one million waterbirds (including ruffs) in a single year from Lake Chilwa in Malawi.

Although this bird eats rice on the wintering grounds, where it can make up nearly 40% of its diet, it takes mainly waste and residues from cropping and threshing, not harvestable grain. It has sometimes been viewed as a pest, but the deeper water and presence of invertebrate prey in the economically important early winter period means that the wader has little effect on crop yield.

== Conservation status ==
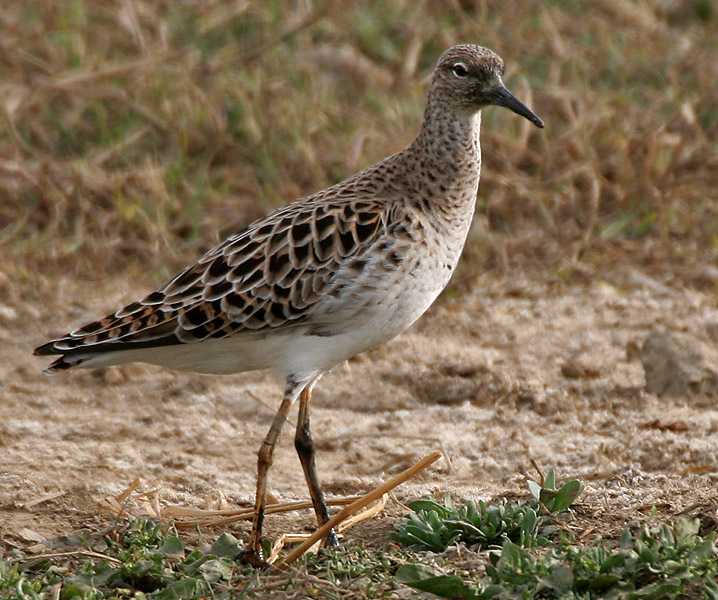
Male in non-breeding plumage in India

The ruff has a large range, estimated at 1–10 million square kilometres (0.38–3.8 million square miles) and a population of at least 2,000,000 birds. The European population of 200,000–510,000 pairs, occupying more than half of the total breeding range, seems to have declined by up to 30% over ten years, but this may reflect geographical changes in breeding populations. The Ruff was last assessed in 2016 on a global scale, and is listed as a least concern species. In 2021, the IUCN assessed the European population of the ruff as near-threatened, which could later reflect an uplisting of the species.

The most important breeding populations in Europe, in Russia and Sweden, are stable, and the breeding range in Norway has expanded to the south, but populations have more than halved in Finland, Estonia, Poland, Latvia and The Netherlands. Although the small populations in these countries are of limited overall significance, the decline is a continuation of trend towards range contraction that has occurred over the last two centuries. The drop in numbers in Europe has been attributed to drainage, increased fertiliser use, the loss of formerly mown or grazed breeding sites and over-hunting.

Fossils from the Pleistocene suggest that this species bred further south in Europe in the cool periods between glaciations than it does now. Its sensitivity to changing climate as well as to water table levels and the speed of vegetation growth has led to suggestions that its range is affected by global warming, and the ruff might act as an indicator species for monitoring climate change. Potential threats to this species may also include outbreaks of diseases to which it is susceptible such as influenza, botulism and avian malaria.

The ruff is one of the species to which the Agreement on the Conservation of African-Eurasian Migratory Waterbirds (AEWA) applies, where it is allocated to category 2c; that is, the populations in need of special attention as they are showing "significant long-term decline" in much of its range. This commits signatories to regulate the taking of listed species or their eggs, to establish protected areas to conserve habitats for the listed species, to regulate hunting and to monitor the populations of the birds concerned.
