= Centromere protein N =

Protein found in humans

CENPN

Identifiers
- Aliases: CENPN, BM039, C16orf60, CENP-N, ICEN32, centromere protein N
- External IDs: OMIM: 611509; MGI: 1919405; GeneCards: CENPN

Gene location (Human)
Chr.	Chromosome 16 (human)
Band	16q23.2	Start	81,006,552 bp
Band	16q23.2	End	81,033,114 bp

Gene location (Mouse)
Chr.	Chromosome 8 (mouse)
Band	8|8 E1	Start	117,648,469 bp
Band	8|8 E1	End	117,668,246 bp
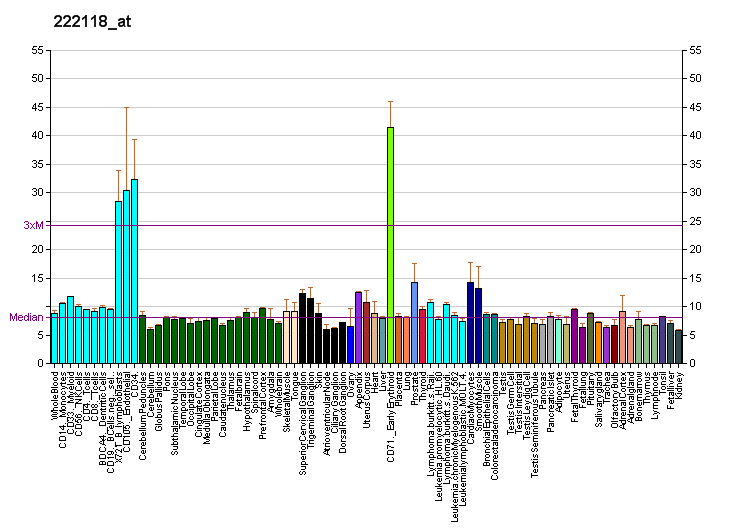

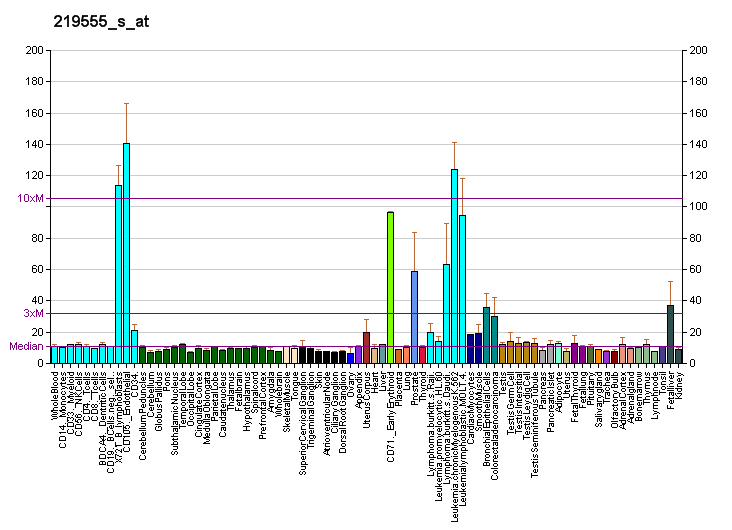
RNA expression pattern
Bgee	Human / Mouse (ortholog); Top expressed in: ventricular zone; ganglionic eminence; buccal mucosa cell; testicle; secondary oocyte; gonad; bone marrow; stromal cell of endometrium; sperm; trabecular bone / Top expressed in: zygote; secondary oocyte; primary oocyte; seminiferous tubule; spermatid; spermatocyte; yolk sac; fetal liver hematopoietic progenitor cell; genital tubercle; tail of embryo; More reference expression data
BioGPS	More reference expression data
Orthologs
Databases	NCBI: entry; OMA: entry
Species	Human	Mouse
Entrez	55839	72155
Ensembl	ENSG00000166451	ENSMUSG00000031756
UniProt	Q96H22	Q9CZW2
RefSeq (mRNA)	NM_001100624; NM_001100625; NM_001270473; NM_001270474; NM_018455	NM_028131
RefSeq (protein)	NP_001094094; NP_001094095; NP_001257402; NP_001257403; NP_060925	NP_082407
Location (UCSC)	Chr 16: 81.01 – 81.03 Mb	Chr 8: 117.65 – 117.67 Mb
PubMed search
- Wikidata
View/Edit Human	View/Edit Mouse

Centromere protein N is a protein that in humans is encoded by the CENPN gene.
