= CDC26 =

Protein-coding gene in humans

Identifiers
- Aliases: CDC26, ANAPC12, APC12, C9orf17, cell division cycle 26
- External IDs: OMIM: 614533; MGI: 1913690; GeneCards: CDC26
Available structures
PDB	Ortholog search: PDBe RCSB
PDB	List of PDB id codes 3HYM, 4UI9, 5A31, 5G05, 5G04,%%s4UI9, 5A31

Gene location (Human)
Chr.	Chromosome 9 (human)
Band	9q32	Start	113,255,835 bp
Band	9q32	End	113,275,572 bp

Gene location (Mouse)
Chr.	Chromosome 4 (mouse)
Band	4|4 B3	Start	62,301,891 bp
Band	4|4 B3	End	62,326,879 bp
RNA expression pattern
Bgee	Human / Mouse (ortholog); Top expressed in: Achilles tendon; mucosa of transverse colon; monocyte; islet of Langerhans; granulocyte; apex of heart; lymph node; left ventricle; rectum; right lung / Top expressed in: ventricular zone; medial ganglionic eminence; yolk sac; abdominal wall; embryo; endocardial cushion; maxillary prominence; mandibular prominence; embryo; dermis; More reference expression data
BioGPS	n/a
Gene ontology
Molecular function	protein binding
Cellular component	cytosol; anaphase-promoting complex; nucleus; nucleoplasm
Biological process	regulation of mitotic metaphase/anaphase transition; cell cycle; anaphase-promoting complex-dependent catabolic process; protein ubiquitination; protein K11-linked ubiquitination; cell division; regulation of mitotic cell cycle phase transition; ubiquitin-dependent protein catabolic process; regulation of mitotic cell cycle
Sources:Amigo / QuickGO
Orthologs
Databases	NCBI: entry; OMA: entry
Species	Human	Mouse
Entrez	246184	66440
Ensembl	ENSG00000176386	ENSMUSG00000066149
UniProt	Q8NHZ8	Q99JP4
RefSeq (mRNA)	NM_139286	NM_139291; NM_001368241
RefSeq (protein)	NP_644815; NP_644815.1	NP_647452; NP_001355170
Location (UCSC)	Chr 9: 113.26 – 113.28 Mb	Chr 4: 62.3 – 62.33 Mb
PubMed search
- Wikidata
View/Edit Human	View/Edit Mouse

Cell division cycle 26 is a protein that in humans is encoded by the CDC26 gene.

== Function ==
The protein encoded by this gene is highly similar to Saccharomyces cerevisiae Cdc26, a component of cell cycle anaphase-promoting complex (APC). APC is composed of a group of highly conserved proteins and functions as a cell cycle-regulated ubiquitin-protein ligase. APC thus is responsible for the cell cycle regulated proteolysis of various proteins. [provided by RefSeq, Jul 2008].
