= List of human protein-coding genes 9 =

Human protein-coding genes listed in the HGNC database
index	Gene symbol	HGNC and UniProt ID(s)
18001	USP17L30	HGNC:44458; Q0WX57
18002	USP18	HGNC:12616; Q9UMW8
18003	USP19	HGNC:12617; O94966
18004	USP20	HGNC:12619; Q9Y2K6
18005	USP21	HGNC:12620; Q9UK80
18006	USP22	HGNC:12621; Q9UPT9
18007	USP24	HGNC:12623; Q9UPU5
18008	USP25	HGNC:12624; Q9UHP3
18009	USP26	HGNC:13485; Q9BXU7
18010	USP27X	HGNC:13486; A6NNY8
18011	USP28	HGNC:12625; Q96RU2
18012	USP29	HGNC:18563; Q9HBJ7
18013	USP30	HGNC:20065; Q70CQ3
18014	USP31	HGNC:20060; Q70CQ4
18015	USP32	HGNC:19143; Q8NFA0
18016	USP33	HGNC:20059; Q8TEY7
18017	USP34	HGNC:20066; Q70CQ2
18018	USP35	HGNC:20061; Q9P2H5
18019	USP36	HGNC:20062; Q9P275
18020	USP37	HGNC:20063; Q86T82
18021	USP38	HGNC:20067; Q8NB14
18022	USP39	HGNC:20071; Q53GS9
18023	USP40	HGNC:20069; Q9NVE5
18024	USP42	HGNC:20068; Q9H9J4
18025	USP43	HGNC:20072; Q70EL4
18026	USP44	HGNC:20064; Q9H0E7
18027	USP45	HGNC:20080; Q70EL2
18028	USP46	HGNC:20075; P62068
18029	USP47	HGNC:20076; Q96K76
18030	USP48	HGNC:18533; Q86UV5
18031	USP49	HGNC:20078; Q70CQ1
18032	USP50	HGNC:20079; Q70EL3
18033	USP51	HGNC:23086; Q70EK9
18034	USP53	HGNC:29255; Q70EK8
18035	USP54	HGNC:23513; Q70EL1
18036	USPL1	HGNC:20294; Q5W0Q7
18037	UST	HGNC:17223; Q9Y2C2
18038	UTF1	HGNC:12634; Q5T230
18039	UTP3	HGNC:24477; Q9NQZ2
18040	UTP4	HGNC:1983; Q969X6
18041	UTP6	HGNC:18279; Q9NYH9
18042	UTP11	HGNC:24329; Q9Y3A2
18043	UTP14A	HGNC:10665; Q9BVJ6
18044	UTP14C	HGNC:20321; Q5TAP6
18045	UTP15	HGNC:25758; Q8TED0
18046	UTP18	HGNC:24274; Q9Y5J1
18047	UTP20	HGNC:17897; O75691
18048	UTP23	HGNC:28224; Q9BRU9
18049	UTP25	HGNC:28440; Q68CQ4
18050	UTRN	HGNC:12635; P46939
18051	UTS2	HGNC:12636; O95399
18052	UTS2B	HGNC:30894; Q765I0
18053	UTS2R	HGNC:4468; Q9UKP6
18054	UTY	HGNC:12638; O14607
18055	UVRAG	HGNC:12640; Q9P2Y5
18056	UVSSA	HGNC:29304; Q2YD98
18057	UXS1	HGNC:17729; Q8NBZ7
18058	UXT	HGNC:12641; Q9UBK9
18059	VAC14	HGNC:25507; Q08AM6
18060	VAMP1	HGNC:12642; P23763
18061	VAMP2	HGNC:12643; P63027
18062	VAMP3	HGNC:12644; Q15836
18063	VAMP4	HGNC:12645; O75379
18064	VAMP5	HGNC:12646; O95183
18065	VAMP7	HGNC:11486; P51809
18066	VAMP8	HGNC:12647; Q9BV40
18067	VANGL1	HGNC:15512; Q8TAA9
18068	VANGL2	HGNC:15511; Q9ULK5
18069	VAPA	HGNC:12648; Q9P0L0
18070	VAPB	HGNC:12649; O95292
18071	VARS1	HGNC:12651; P26640
18072	VARS2	HGNC:21642; Q5ST30
18073	VASH1	HGNC:19964; Q7L8A9
18074	VASH2	HGNC:25723; Q86V25
18075	VASN	HGNC:18517; Q6EMK4
18076	VASP	HGNC:12652; P50552
18077	VAT1	HGNC:16919; Q99536
18078	VAT1L	HGNC:29315; Q9HCJ6
18079	VAV1	HGNC:12657; P15498
18080	VAV2	HGNC:12658; P52735
18081	VAV3	HGNC:12659; Q9UKW4
18082	VAX1	HGNC:12660; Q5SQQ9
18083	VAX2	HGNC:12661; Q9UIW0
18084	VBP1	HGNC:12662; P61758
18085	VCAM1	HGNC:12663; P19320
18086	VCAN	HGNC:2464; P13611
18087	VCF1	HGNC:25918; Q969W3
18088	VCF2	HGNC:25085; Q5XKR9
18089	VCL	HGNC:12665; P18206
18090	VCP	HGNC:12666; P55072
18091	VCPIP1	HGNC:30897; Q96JH7
18092	VCPKMT	HGNC:20352; Q9H867
18093	VCX	HGNC:12667; Q9H320
18094	VCX2	HGNC:18158; Q9H322
18095	VCX3A	HGNC:18159; Q9NNX9
18096	VCX3B	HGNC:31838; Q9H321
18097	VCY	HGNC:12668; O14598
18098	VCY1B	HGNC:31751; O14598
18099	VDAC1	HGNC:12669; P21796
18100	VDAC2	HGNC:12672; P45880
18101	VDAC3	HGNC:12674; Q9Y277
18102	VDR	HGNC:12679; P11473
18103	VEGFA	HGNC:12680; P15692
18104	VEGFB	HGNC:12681; P49765
18105	VEGFC	HGNC:12682; P49767
18106	VEGFD	HGNC:3708; O43915
18107	VENTX	HGNC:13639; O95231
18108	VEPH1	HGNC:25735; Q14D04
18109	VEZF1	HGNC:12949; Q14119
18110	VEZT	HGNC:18258; Q9HBM0
18111	VGF	HGNC:12684; O15240
18112	VGLL1	HGNC:20985; Q99990
18113	VGLL2	HGNC:20232; Q8N8G2
18114	VGLL3	HGNC:24327; A8MV65
18115	VGLL4	HGNC:28966; Q14135
18116	VHL	HGNC:12687; P40337
18117	VHLL	HGNC:30666; Q6RSH7
18118	VIL1	HGNC:12690; P09327
18119	VILL	HGNC:30906; O15195
18120	VIM	HGNC:12692; P08670
18121	VIP	HGNC:12693; P01282
18122	VIPAS39	HGNC:20347; Q9H9C1
18123	VIPR1	HGNC:12694; P32241
18124	VIPR2	HGNC:12695; P41587
18125	VIRMA	HGNC:24500; Q69YN4
18126	VIT	HGNC:12697; Q6UXI7
18127	VKORC1	HGNC:23663; Q9BQB6
18128	VKORC1L1	HGNC:21492; Q8N0U8
18129	VLDLR	HGNC:12698; P98155
18130	VMA12	HGNC:18085; Q8N511
18131	VMA21	HGNC:22082; Q3ZAQ7
18132	VMA22	HGNC:28178; Q96NT0
18133	VMAC	HGNC:33803; Q2NL98
18134	VMO1	HGNC:30387; Q7Z5L0
18135	VMP1	HGNC:29559; Q96GC9
18136	VN1R1	HGNC:13548; Q9GZP7
18137	VN1R2	HGNC:19872; Q8NFZ6
18138	VN1R4	HGNC:19871; Q7Z5H5
18139	VN1R5	HGNC:19870; Q7Z5H4
18140	VNN1	HGNC:12705; O95497
18141	VNN2	HGNC:12706; O95498
18142	VOPP1	HGNC:34518; Q96AW1
18143	VPREB1	HGNC:12709; P12018
18144	VPREB3	HGNC:12710; Q9UKI3
18145	VPS4A	HGNC:13488; Q9UN37
18146	VPS4B	HGNC:10895; O75351
18147	VPS8	HGNC:29122; Q8N3P4
18148	VPS9D1	HGNC:13526; Q9Y2B5
18149	VPS11	HGNC:14583; Q9H270
18150	VPS13A	HGNC:1908; Q96RL7
18151	VPS13B	HGNC:2183; Q7Z7G8
18152	VPS13C	HGNC:23594; Q709C8
18153	VPS13D	HGNC:23595; Q5THJ4
18154	VPS16	HGNC:14584; Q9H269
18155	VPS18	HGNC:15972; Q9P253
18156	VPS25	HGNC:28122; Q9BRG1
18157	VPS26A	HGNC:12711; O75436
18158	VPS26B	HGNC:28119; Q4G0F5
18159	VPS26C	HGNC:3044; O14972
18160	VPS28	HGNC:18178; Q9UK41
18161	VPS29	HGNC:14340; Q9UBQ0
18162	VPS33A	HGNC:18179; Q96AX1
18163	VPS33B	HGNC:12712; Q9H267
18164	VPS35	HGNC:13487; Q96QK1
18165	VPS35L	HGNC:24641; Q7Z3J2
18166	VPS36	HGNC:20312; Q86VN1
18167	VPS37A	HGNC:24928; Q8NEZ2
18168	VPS37B	HGNC:25754; Q9H9H4
18169	VPS37C	HGNC:26097; A5D8V6
18170	VPS37D	HGNC:18287; Q86XT2
18171	VPS39	HGNC:20593; Q96JC1
18172	VPS41	HGNC:12713; P49754
18173	VPS45	HGNC:14579; Q9NRW7
18174	VPS50	HGNC:25956; Q96JG6
18175	VPS51	HGNC:1172; Q9UID3
18176	VPS52	HGNC:10518; Q8N1B4
18177	VPS53	HGNC:25608; Q5VIR6
18178	VPS54	HGNC:18652; Q9P1Q0
18179	VPS72	HGNC:11644; Q15906
18180	VRK1	HGNC:12718; Q99986
18181	VRK2	HGNC:12719; Q86Y07
18182	VRK3	HGNC:18996; Q8IV63
18183	VRTN	HGNC:20223; Q9H8Y1
18184	VSIG1	HGNC:28675; Q86XK7
18185	VSIG2	HGNC:17149; Q96IQ7
18186	VSIG4	HGNC:17032; Q9Y279
18187	VSIG8	HGNC:32063; P0DPA2
18188	VSIG10	HGNC:26078; Q8N0Z9
18189	VSIG10L	HGNC:27111; Q86VR7
18190	VSIG10L2	HGNC:27879; P0DP72
18191	VSIR	HGNC:30085; Q9H7M9
18192	VSNL1	HGNC:12722; P62760
18193	VSTM1	HGNC:29455; Q6UX27
18194	VSTM2A	HGNC:28499; Q8TAG5
18195	VSTM2B	HGNC:33595; A6NLU5
18196	VSTM2L	HGNC:16096; Q96N03
18197	VSTM4	HGNC:26470; Q8IW00
18198	VSTM5	HGNC:34443; A8MXK1
18199	VSX1	HGNC:12723; Q9NZR4
18200	VSX2	HGNC:1975; P58304
18201	VTA1	HGNC:20954; Q9NP79
18202	VTCN1	HGNC:28873; Q7Z7D3
18203	VTI1A	HGNC:17792; Q96AJ9
18204	VTI1B	HGNC:17793; Q9UEU0
18205	VTN	HGNC:12724; P04004
18206	VWA1	HGNC:30910; Q6PCB0
18207	VWA2	HGNC:24709; Q5GFL6
18208	VWA3A	HGNC:27088; A6NCI4
18209	VWA3B	HGNC:28385; Q502W6
18210	VWA5A	HGNC:6658; O00534
18211	VWA5B1	HGNC:26538; Q5TIE3
18212	VWA5B2	HGNC:25144; Q8N398
18213	VWA7	HGNC:13939; Q9Y334
18214	VWA8	HGNC:29071; A3KMH1
18215	VWC2	HGNC:30200; Q2TAL6
18216	VWC2L	HGNC:37203; B2RUY7
18217	VWCE	HGNC:26487; Q96DN2
18218	VWDE	HGNC:21897; Q8N2E2
18219	VWF	HGNC:12726; P04275
18220	VXN	HGNC:28498; Q8TAG6
18221	WAC	HGNC:17327; Q9BTA9
18222	WAPL	HGNC:23293; Q7Z5K2
18223	WARS1	HGNC:12729; P23381
18224	WARS2	HGNC:12730; Q9UGM6
18225	WAS	HGNC:12731; P42768
18226	WASF1	HGNC:12732; Q92558
18227	WASF2	HGNC:12733; Q9Y6W5
18228	WASF3	HGNC:12734; Q9UPY6
18229	WASHC1	HGNC:24361; A8K0Z3
18230	WASHC2A	HGNC:23416; Q641Q2
18231	WASHC2C	HGNC:23414; Q9Y4E1
18232	WASHC3	HGNC:24256; Q9Y3C0
18233	WASHC4	HGNC:29174; Q2M389
18234	WASHC5	HGNC:28984; Q12768
18235	WASL	HGNC:12735; O00401
18236	WBP1	HGNC:12737; Q96G27
18237	WBP1L	HGNC:23510; Q9NX94
18238	WBP2	HGNC:12738; Q969T9
18239	WBP2NL	HGNC:28389; Q6ICG8
18240	WBP4	HGNC:12739; O75554
18241	WBP11	HGNC:16461; Q9Y2W2
18242	WDCP	HGNC:26157; Q9H6R7
18243	WDFY1	HGNC:20451; Q8IWB7
18244	WDFY2	HGNC:20482; Q96P53
18245	WDFY3	HGNC:20751; Q8IZQ1
18246	WDFY4	HGNC:29323; Q6ZS81
18247	WDHD1	HGNC:23170; O75717
18248	WDPCP	HGNC:28027; O95876
18249	WDR1	HGNC:12754; O75083
18250	WDR3	HGNC:12755; Q9UNX4
18251	WDR4	HGNC:12756; P57081
18252	WDR5	HGNC:12757; P61964
18253	WDR5B	HGNC:17826; Q86VZ2
18254	WDR6	HGNC:12758; Q9NNW5
18255	WDR7	HGNC:13490; Q9Y4E6
18256	WDR11	HGNC:13831; Q9BZH6
18257	WDR12	HGNC:14098; Q9GZL7
18258	WDR13	HGNC:14352; Q9H1Z4
18259	WDR17	HGNC:16661; Q8IZU2
18260	WDR18	HGNC:17956; Q9BV38
18261	WDR19	HGNC:18340; Q8NEZ3
18262	WDR20	HGNC:19667; Q8TBZ3
18263	WDR24	HGNC:20852; Q96S15
18264	WDR25	HGNC:21064; Q64LD2
18265	WDR26	HGNC:21208; Q9H7D7
18266	WDR27	HGNC:21248; A2RRH5
18267	WDR31	HGNC:21421; Q8NA23
18268	WDR33	HGNC:25651; Q9C0J8
18269	WDR35	HGNC:29250; Q9P2L0
18270	WDR36	HGNC:30696; Q8NI36
18271	WDR37	HGNC:31406; Q9Y2I8
18272	WDR38	HGNC:23745; Q5JTN6
18273	WDR41	HGNC:25601; Q9HAD4
18274	WDR43	HGNC:28945; Q15061
18275	WDR44	HGNC:30512; Q5JSH3
18276	WDR45	HGNC:28912; Q9Y484
18277	WDR45B	HGNC:25072; Q5MNZ6
18278	WDR46	HGNC:13923; O15213
18279	WDR47	HGNC:29141; O94967
18280	WDR48	HGNC:30914; Q8TAF3
18281	WDR49	HGNC:26587; Q8IV35
18282	WDR53	HGNC:28786; Q7Z5U6
18283	WDR54	HGNC:25770; Q9H977
18284	WDR55	HGNC:25971; Q9H6Y2
18285	WDR59	HGNC:25706; Q6PJI9
18286	WDR62	HGNC:24502; O43379
18287	WDR64	HGNC:26570; B1ANS9
18288	WDR70	HGNC:25495; Q9NW82
18289	WDR72	HGNC:26790; Q3MJ13
18290	WDR73	HGNC:25928; Q6P4I2
18291	WDR74	HGNC:25529; Q6RFH5
18292	WDR75	HGNC:25725; Q8IWA0
18293	WDR76	HGNC:25773; Q9H967
18294	WDR77	HGNC:29652; Q9BQA1
18295	WDR81	HGNC:26600; Q562E7
18296	WDR82	HGNC:28826; Q6UXN9
18297	WDR83	HGNC:32672; Q9BRX9
18298	WDR83OS	HGNC:30203; Q9Y284
18299	WDR86	HGNC:28020; Q86TI4
18300	WDR87	HGNC:29934; Q6ZQQ6
18301	WDR88	HGNC:26999; Q6ZMY6
18302	WDR89	HGNC:20489; Q96FK6
18303	WDR90	HGNC:26960; Q96KV7
18304	WDR91	HGNC:24997; A4D1P6
18305	WDR93	HGNC:26924; Q6P2C0
18306	WDR97	HGNC:26959; A6NE52
18307	WDSUB1	HGNC:26697; Q8N9V3
18308	WDTC1	HGNC:29175; Q8N5D0
18309	WEE1	HGNC:12761; P30291
18310	WEE2	HGNC:19684; P0C1S8
18311	WFDC1	HGNC:15466; Q9HC57
18312	WFDC2	HGNC:15939; Q14508
18313	WFDC3	HGNC:15957; Q8IUB2
18314	WFDC5	HGNC:20477; Q8TCV5
18315	WFDC6	HGNC:16164; Q9BQY6
18316	WFDC8	HGNC:16163; Q8IUA0
18317	WFDC9	HGNC:20380; Q8NEX5
18318	WFDC10A	HGNC:16139; Q9H1F0
18319	WFDC10B	HGNC:20479; Q8IUB3
18320	WFDC11	HGNC:20478; Q8NEX6
18321	WFDC12	HGNC:16115; Q8WWY7
18322	WFDC13	HGNC:16131; Q8IUB5
18323	WFIKKN1	HGNC:30912; Q96NZ8
18324	WFIKKN2	HGNC:30916; Q8TEU8
18325	WFS1	HGNC:12762; O76024
18326	WHAMM	HGNC:30493; Q8TF30
18327	WHR1	HGNC:11398; P49842
18328	WHRN	HGNC:16361; Q9P202
18329	WIF1	HGNC:18081; Q9Y5W5
18330	WIPF1	HGNC:12736; O43516
18331	WIPF2	HGNC:30923; Q8TF74
18332	WIPF3	HGNC:22004; A6NGB9
18333	WIPI1	HGNC:25471; Q5MNZ9
18334	WIPI2	HGNC:32225; Q9Y4P8
18335	WIZ	HGNC:30917; O95785
18336	WLS	HGNC:30238; Q5T9L3
18337	WNK1	HGNC:14540; Q9H4A3
18338	WNK2	HGNC:14542; Q9Y3S1
18339	WNK3	HGNC:14543; Q9BYP7
18340	WNK4	HGNC:14544; Q96J92
18341	WNT1	HGNC:12774; P04628
18342	WNT2	HGNC:12780; P09544
18343	WNT2B	HGNC:12781; Q93097
18344	WNT3	HGNC:12782; P56703
18345	WNT3A	HGNC:15983; P56704
18346	WNT4	HGNC:12783; P56705
18347	WNT5A	HGNC:12784; P41221
18348	WNT5B	HGNC:16265; Q9H1J7
18349	WNT6	HGNC:12785; Q9Y6F9
18350	WNT7A	HGNC:12786; O00755
18351	WNT7B	HGNC:12787; P56706
18352	WNT8A	HGNC:12788; Q9H1J5
18353	WNT8B	HGNC:12789; Q93098
18354	WNT9A	HGNC:12778; O14904
18355	WNT9B	HGNC:12779; O14905
18356	WNT10A	HGNC:13829; Q9GZT5
18357	WNT10B	HGNC:12775; O00744
18358	WNT11	HGNC:12776; O96014
18359	WNT16	HGNC:16267; Q9UBV4
18360	WRAP53	HGNC:25522; Q9BUR4
18361	WRAP73	HGNC:12759; Q9P2S5
18362	WRN	HGNC:12791; Q14191
18363	WRNIP1	HGNC:20876; Q96S55
18364	WSB1	HGNC:19221; Q9Y6I7
18365	WSB2	HGNC:19222; Q9NYS7
18366	WSCD1	HGNC:29060; Q658N2
18367	WSCD2	HGNC:29117; Q2TBF2
18368	WT1	HGNC:12796; P19544
18369	WTAP	HGNC:16846; Q15007
18370	WTIP	HGNC:20964; A6NIX2
18371	WWC1	HGNC:29435; Q8IX03
18372	WWC2	HGNC:24148; Q6AWC2
18373	WWC3	HGNC:29237; Q9ULE0
18374	WWOX	HGNC:12799; Q9NZC7
18375	WWP1	HGNC:17004; Q9H0M0
18376	WWP2	HGNC:16804; O00308
18377	WWTR1	HGNC:24042; Q9GZV5
18378	XAB2	HGNC:14089; Q9HCS7
18379	XAF1	HGNC:30932; Q6GPH4
18380	XAGE1A	HGNC:4111; Q9HD64
18381	XAGE1B	HGNC:25400; Q9HD64
18382	XAGE2	HGNC:4112; Q96GT9
18383	XAGE3	HGNC:14618; Q8WTP9
18384	XAGE5	HGNC:30930; Q8WWM1
18385	XBP1	HGNC:12801; P17861
18386	XCL1	HGNC:10645; P47992
18387	XCL2	HGNC:10646; Q9UBD3
18388	XCR1	HGNC:1625; P46094
18389	XDH	HGNC:12805; P47989
18390	XG	HGNC:12806; P55808
18391	XIAP	HGNC:592; P98170
18392	XIRP1	HGNC:14301; Q702N8
18393	XIRP2	HGNC:14303; A4UGR9
18394	XK	HGNC:12811; P51811
18395	XKR3	HGNC:28778; Q5GH77
18396	XKR4	HGNC:29394; Q5GH76
18397	XKR5	HGNC:20782; Q6UX68
18398	XKR6	HGNC:27806; Q5GH73
18399	XKR7	HGNC:23062; Q5GH72
18400	XKR8	HGNC:25508; Q9H6D3
18401	XKR9	HGNC:20937; Q5GH70
18402	XKRX	HGNC:29845; Q6PP77
18403	XNDC1N	HGNC:54661; Q6ZNB5
18404	XPA	HGNC:12814; P23025
18405	XPC	HGNC:12816; Q01831
18406	XPNPEP1	HGNC:12822; Q9NQW7
18407	XPNPEP2	HGNC:12823; O43895
18408	XPNPEP3	HGNC:28052; Q9NQH7
18409	XPO1	HGNC:12825; O14980
18410	XPO4	HGNC:17796; Q9C0E2
18411	XPO5	HGNC:17675; Q9HAV4
18412	XPO6	HGNC:19733; Q96QU8
18413	XPO7	HGNC:14108; Q9UIA9
18414	XPOT	HGNC:12826; O43592
18415	XPR1	HGNC:12827; Q9UBH6
18416	XRCC1	HGNC:12828; P18887
18417	XRCC2	HGNC:12829; O43543
18418	XRCC3	HGNC:12830; O43542
18419	XRCC4	HGNC:12831; Q13426
18420	XRCC5	HGNC:12833; P13010
18421	XRCC6	HGNC:4055; P12956
18422	XRN1	HGNC:30654; Q8IZH2
18423	XRN2	HGNC:12836; Q9H0D6
18424	XRRA1	HGNC:18868; Q6P2D8
18425	XXYLT1	HGNC:26639; Q8NBI6
18426	XYLB	HGNC:12839; O75191
18427	XYLT1	HGNC:15516; Q86Y38
18428	XYLT2	HGNC:15517; Q9H1B5
18429	YAE1	HGNC:24857; Q9NRH1
18430	YAF2	HGNC:17363; Q8IY57
18431	YAP1	HGNC:16262; P46937
18432	YARS1	HGNC:12840; P54577
18433	YARS2	HGNC:24249; Q9Y2Z4
18434	YBEY	HGNC:1299; P58557
18435	YBX1	HGNC:8014; P67809
18436	YBX2	HGNC:17948; Q9Y2T7
18437	YBX3	HGNC:2428; P16989
18438	YDJC	HGNC:27158; A8MPS7
18439	YEATS2	HGNC:25489; Q9ULM3
18440	YEATS4	HGNC:24859; O95619
18441	YES1	HGNC:12841; P07947
18442	YIF1A	HGNC:16688; O95070
18443	YIF1B	HGNC:30511; Q5BJH7
18444	YIPF1	HGNC:25231; Q9Y548
18445	YIPF2	HGNC:28476; Q9BWQ6
18446	YIPF3	HGNC:21023; Q9GZM5
18447	YIPF4	HGNC:28145; Q9BSR8
18448	YIPF5	HGNC:24877; Q969M3
18449	YIPF6	HGNC:28304; Q96EC8
18450	YIPF7	HGNC:26825; Q8N8F6
18451	YJEFN3	HGNC:24785; A6XGL0
18452	YJU2	HGNC:25518; Q9BW85
18453	YJU2B	HGNC:28118; P13994
18454	YKT6	HGNC:16959; O15498
18455	YLPM1	HGNC:17798; P49750
18456	YME1L1	HGNC:12843; Q96TA2
18457	YOD1	HGNC:25035; Q5VVQ6
18458	YPEL1	HGNC:12845; O60688
18459	YPEL2	HGNC:18326; Q96QA6
18460	YPEL3	HGNC:18327; P61236
18461	YPEL4	HGNC:18328; Q96NS1
18462	YPEL5	HGNC:18329; P62699
18463	YRDC	HGNC:28905; Q86U90
18464	YTHDC1	HGNC:30626; Q96MU7
18465	YTHDC2	HGNC:24721; Q9H6S0
18466	YTHDF1	HGNC:15867; Q9BYJ9
18467	YTHDF2	HGNC:31675; Q9Y5A9
18468	YTHDF3	HGNC:26465; Q7Z739
18469	YWHAB	HGNC:12849; P31946
18470	YWHAE	HGNC:12851; P62258
18471	YWHAG	HGNC:12852; P61981
18472	YWHAH	HGNC:12853; Q04917
18473	YWHAQ	HGNC:12854; P27348
18474	YWHAZ	HGNC:12855; P63104
18475	YY1	HGNC:12856; P25490
18476	YY1AP1	HGNC:30935; Q9H869
18477	YY2	HGNC:31684; O15391
18478	ZACN	HGNC:29504; Q401N2
18479	ZAN	HGNC:12857; Q9Y493
18480	ZAP70	HGNC:12858; P43403
18481	ZAR1	HGNC:20436; Q86SH2
18482	ZAR1L	HGNC:37116; A6NP61
18483	ZBBX	HGNC:26245; A8MT70
18484	ZBED1	HGNC:447; O96006
18485	ZBED2	HGNC:20710; Q9BTP6
18486	ZBED3	HGNC:20711; Q96IU2
18487	ZBED4	HGNC:20721; O75132
18488	ZBED5	HGNC:30803; Q49AG3
18489	ZBED6	HGNC:33273; P86452
18490	ZBP1	HGNC:16176; Q9H171
18491	ZBTB1	HGNC:20259; Q9Y2K1
18492	ZBTB2	HGNC:20868; Q8N680
18493	ZBTB3	HGNC:22918; Q9H5J0
18494	ZBTB4	HGNC:23847; Q9P1Z0
18495	ZBTB5	HGNC:23836; O15062
18496	ZBTB6	HGNC:16764; Q15916
18497	ZBTB7A	HGNC:18078; O95365
18498	ZBTB7B	HGNC:18668; O15156
18499	ZBTB7C	HGNC:31700; A1YPR0
18500	ZBTB8A	HGNC:24172; Q96BR9
18501	ZBTB8B	HGNC:37057; Q8NAP8
18502	ZBTB8OS	HGNC:24094; Q8IWT0
18503	ZBTB9	HGNC:28323; Q96C00
18504	ZBTB10	HGNC:30953; Q96DT7
18505	ZBTB11	HGNC:16740; O95625
18506	ZBTB12	HGNC:19066; Q9Y330
18507	ZBTB14	HGNC:12860; O43829
18508	ZBTB16	HGNC:12930; Q05516
18509	ZBTB17	HGNC:12936; Q13105
18510	ZBTB18	HGNC:13030; Q99592
18511	ZBTB20	HGNC:13503; Q9HC78
18512	ZBTB21	HGNC:13083; Q9ULJ3
18513	ZBTB22	HGNC:13085; O15209
18514	ZBTB24	HGNC:21143; O43167
18515	ZBTB25	HGNC:13112; P24278
18516	ZBTB26	HGNC:23383; Q9HCK0
18517	ZBTB32	HGNC:16763; Q9Y2Y4
18518	ZBTB33	HGNC:16682; Q86T24
18519	ZBTB34	HGNC:31446; Q8NCN2
18520	ZBTB37	HGNC:28365; Q5TC79
18521	ZBTB38	HGNC:26636; Q8NAP3
18522	ZBTB39	HGNC:29014; O15060
18523	ZBTB40	HGNC:29045; Q9NUA8
18524	ZBTB41	HGNC:24819; Q5SVQ8
18525	ZBTB42	HGNC:32550; B2RXF5
18526	ZBTB43	HGNC:17908; O43298
18527	ZBTB44	HGNC:25001; Q8NCP5
18528	ZBTB45	HGNC:23715; Q96K62
18529	ZBTB46	HGNC:16094; Q86UZ6
18530	ZBTB47	HGNC:26955; Q9UFB7
18531	ZBTB48	HGNC:4930; P10074
18532	ZBTB49	HGNC:19883; Q6ZSB9
18533	ZC2HC1A	HGNC:24277; Q96GY0
18534	ZC2HC1B	HGNC:21174; Q5TFG8
18535	ZC2HC1C	HGNC:20354; Q53FD0
18536	ZC3H3	HGNC:28972; Q8IXZ2
18537	ZC3H4	HGNC:17808; Q9UPT8
18538	ZC3H6	HGNC:24762; P61129
18539	ZC3H7A	HGNC:30959; Q8IWR0
18540	ZC3H7B	HGNC:30869; Q9UGR2
18541	ZC3H8	HGNC:30941; Q8N5P1
18542	ZC3H10	HGNC:25893; Q96K80
18543	ZC3H11A	HGNC:29093; O75152
18544	ZC3H11B	HGNC:25659; A0A1B0GTU1
18545	ZC3H11C	HGNC:56304; P0DQW0
18546	ZC3H12A	HGNC:26259; Q5D1E8
18547	ZC3H12B	HGNC:17407; Q5HYM0
18548	ZC3H12C	HGNC:29362; Q9C0D7
18549	ZC3H12D	HGNC:21175; A2A288
18550	ZC3H13	HGNC:20368; Q5T200
18551	ZC3H14	HGNC:20509; Q6PJT7
18552	ZC3H15	HGNC:29528; Q8WU90
18553	ZC3H18	HGNC:25091; Q86VM9
18554	ZC3HAV1	HGNC:23721; Q7Z2W4
18555	ZC3HAV1L	HGNC:22423; Q96H79
18556	ZC3HC1	HGNC:29913; Q86WB0
18557	ZC4H2	HGNC:24931; Q9NQZ6
18558	ZCCHC2	HGNC:22916; Q9C0B9
18559	ZCCHC3	HGNC:16230; Q9NUD5
18560	ZCCHC4	HGNC:22917; Q9H5U6
18561	ZCCHC7	HGNC:26209; Q8N3Z6
18562	ZCCHC8	HGNC:25265; Q6NZY4
18563	ZCCHC9	HGNC:25424; Q8N567
18564	ZCCHC10	HGNC:25954; Q8TBK6
18565	ZCCHC12	HGNC:27273; Q6PEW1
18566	ZCCHC13	HGNC:31749; Q8WW36
18567	ZCCHC14	HGNC:24134; Q8WYQ9
18568	ZCCHC17	HGNC:30246; Q9NP64
18569	ZCCHC18	HGNC:32459; P0CG32
18570	ZCCHC24	HGNC:26911; Q8N2G6
18571	ZCRB1	HGNC:29620; Q8TBF4
18572	ZCWPW1	HGNC:23486; Q9H0M4
18573	ZCWPW2	HGNC:23574; Q504Y3
18574	ZDBF2	HGNC:29313; Q9HCK1
18575	ZDHHC1	HGNC:17916; Q8WTX9
18576	ZDHHC2	HGNC:18469; Q9UIJ5
18577	ZDHHC3	HGNC:18470; Q9NYG2
18578	ZDHHC4	HGNC:18471; Q9NPG8
18579	ZDHHC5	HGNC:18472; Q9C0B5
18580	ZDHHC6	HGNC:19160; Q9H6R6
18581	ZDHHC7	HGNC:18459; Q9NXF8
18582	ZDHHC8	HGNC:18474; Q9ULC8
18583	ZDHHC9	HGNC:18475; Q9Y397
18584	ZDHHC11	HGNC:19158; Q9H8X9
18585	ZDHHC11B	HGNC:32962; P0C7U3
18586	ZDHHC12	HGNC:19159; Q96GR4
18587	ZDHHC13	HGNC:18413; Q8IUH4
18588	ZDHHC14	HGNC:20341; Q8IZN3
18589	ZDHHC15	HGNC:20342; Q96MV8
18590	ZDHHC16	HGNC:20714; Q969W1
18591	ZDHHC17	HGNC:18412; Q8IUH5
18592	ZDHHC18	HGNC:20712; Q9NUE0
18593	ZDHHC19	HGNC:20713; Q8WVZ1
18594	ZDHHC20	HGNC:20749; Q5W0Z9
18595	ZDHHC21	HGNC:20750; Q8IVQ6
18596	ZDHHC22	HGNC:20106; Q8N966
18597	ZDHHC23	HGNC:28654; Q8IYP9
18598	ZDHHC24	HGNC:27387; Q6UX98
18599	ZEB1	HGNC:11642; P37275
18600	ZEB2	HGNC:14881; O60315
18601	ZER1	HGNC:30960; Q7Z7L7
18602	ZFAND1	HGNC:25858; Q8TCF1
18603	ZFAND2A	HGNC:28073; Q8N6M9
18604	ZFAND2B	HGNC:25206; Q8WV99
18605	ZFAND3	HGNC:18019; Q9H8U3
18606	ZFAND4	HGNC:23504; Q86XD8
18607	ZFAND5	HGNC:13008; O76080
18608	ZFAND6	HGNC:30164; Q6FIF0
18609	ZFAT	HGNC:19899; Q9P243
18610	ZFC3H1	HGNC:28328; O60293
18611	ZFHX2	HGNC:20152; Q9C0A1
18612	ZFHX3	HGNC:777; Q15911
18613	ZFHX4	HGNC:30939; Q86UP3
18614	ZFP1	HGNC:23328; Q6P2D0
18615	ZFP2	HGNC:26138; Q6ZN57
18616	ZFP3	HGNC:12861; Q96NJ6
18617	ZFP14	HGNC:29312; Q9HCL3
18618	ZFP28	HGNC:17801; Q8NHY6
18619	ZFP30	HGNC:29555; Q9Y2G7
18620	ZFP36	HGNC:12862; P26651
18621	ZFP36L1	HGNC:1107; Q07352
18622	ZFP36L2	HGNC:1108; P47974
18623	ZFP37	HGNC:12863; Q9Y6Q3
18624	ZFP41	HGNC:26786; Q8N8Y5
18625	ZFP42	HGNC:30949; Q96MM3
18626	ZFP57	HGNC:18791; Q9NU63
18627	ZFP62	HGNC:23241; Q8NB50
18628	ZFP64	HGNC:15940; Q9NTW7
18629	ZFP69	HGNC:24708; Q49AA0
18630	ZFP69B	HGNC:28053; Q9UJL9
18631	ZFP82	HGNC:28682; Q8N141
18632	ZFP90	HGNC:23329; Q8TF47
18633	ZFP91	HGNC:14983; Q96JP5
18634	ZFP92	HGNC:12865; A6NM28
18635	ZFPL1	HGNC:12868; O95159
18636	ZFPM1	HGNC:19762; Q8IX07
18637	ZFPM2	HGNC:16700; Q8WW38
18638	ZFR	HGNC:17277; Q96KR1
18639	ZFR2	HGNC:29189; Q9UPR6
18640	ZFTA	HGNC:28449; C9JLR9
18641	ZFTRAF1	HGNC:17806; P0DTL6
18642	ZFX	HGNC:12869; P17010
18643	ZFY	HGNC:12870; P08048
18644	ZFYVE1	HGNC:13180; Q9HBF4
18645	ZFYVE9	HGNC:6775; O95405
18646	ZFYVE16	HGNC:20756; Q7Z3T8
18647	ZFYVE19	HGNC:20758; Q96K21
18648	ZFYVE21	HGNC:20760; Q9BQ24
18649	ZFYVE26	HGNC:20761; Q68DK2
18650	ZFYVE27	HGNC:26559; Q5T4F4
18651	ZFYVE28	HGNC:29334; Q9HCC9
18652	ZG16	HGNC:30961; O60844
18653	ZG16B	HGNC:30456; Q96DA0
18654	ZGLP1	HGNC:37245; P0C6A0
18655	ZGPAT	HGNC:15948; Q8N5A5
18656	ZGRF1	HGNC:25654; Q86YA3
18657	ZHX1	HGNC:12871; Q9UKY1
18658	ZHX2	HGNC:18513; Q9Y6X8
18659	ZHX3	HGNC:15935; Q9H4I2
18660	ZIC1	HGNC:12872; Q15915
18661	ZIC2	HGNC:12873; O95409
18662	ZIC3	HGNC:12874; O60481
18663	ZIC4	HGNC:20393; Q8N9L1
18664	ZIC5	HGNC:20322; Q96T25
18665	ZIK1	HGNC:33104; Q3SY52
18666	ZIM2	HGNC:12875; Q9NZV7
18667	ZIM3	HGNC:16366; Q96PE6
18668	ZKSCAN1	HGNC:13101; P17029
18669	ZKSCAN2	HGNC:25677; Q63HK3
18670	ZKSCAN3	HGNC:13853; Q9BRR0
18671	ZKSCAN4	HGNC:13854; Q969J2
18672	ZKSCAN5	HGNC:12867; Q9Y2L8
18673	ZKSCAN7	HGNC:12955; Q9P0L1
18674	ZKSCAN8	HGNC:12983; Q15776
18675	ZMAT1	HGNC:29377; Q5H9K5
18676	ZMAT2	HGNC:26433; Q96NC0
18677	ZMAT3	HGNC:29983; Q9HA38
18678	ZMAT4	HGNC:25844; Q9H898
18679	ZMAT5	HGNC:28046; Q9UDW3
18680	ZMIZ1	HGNC:16493; Q9ULJ6
18681	ZMIZ2	HGNC:22229; Q8NF64
18682	ZMPSTE24	HGNC:12877; O75844
18683	ZMYM1	HGNC:26253; Q5SVZ6
18684	ZMYM2	HGNC:12989; Q9UBW7
18685	ZMYM3	HGNC:13054; Q14202
18686	ZMYM4	HGNC:13055; Q5VZL5
18687	ZMYM5	HGNC:13029; Q9UJ78
18688	ZMYM6	HGNC:13050; O95789
18689	ZMYND8	HGNC:9397; Q9ULU4
18690	ZMYND10	HGNC:19412; O75800
18691	ZMYND11	HGNC:16966; Q15326
18692	ZMYND12	HGNC:21192; Q9H0C1
18693	ZMYND15	HGNC:20997; Q9H091
18694	ZMYND19	HGNC:21146; Q96E35
18695	ZNF2	HGNC:12991; Q9BSG1
18696	ZNF3	HGNC:13089; P17036
18697	ZNF7	HGNC:13139; P17097
18698	ZNF8	HGNC:13154; P17098
18699	ZNF10	HGNC:12879; P21506
18700	ZNF12	HGNC:12902; P17014
18701	ZNF14	HGNC:12924; P17017
18702	ZNF16	HGNC:12947; P17020
18703	ZNF17	HGNC:12958; P17021
18704	ZNF18	HGNC:12969; P17022
18705	ZNF19	HGNC:12981; P17023
18706	ZNF20	HGNC:12992; P17024
18707	ZNF22	HGNC:13012; P17026
18708	ZNF23	HGNC:13023; P17027
18709	ZNF24	HGNC:13032; P17028
18710	ZNF25	HGNC:13043; P17030
18711	ZNF26	HGNC:13053; P17031
18712	ZNF28	HGNC:13073; P17035
18713	ZNF30	HGNC:13090; P17039
18714	ZNF32	HGNC:13095; P17041
18715	ZNF33A	HGNC:13096; Q06730
18716	ZNF33B	HGNC:13097; Q06732
18717	ZNF34	HGNC:13098; Q8IZ26
18718	ZNF35	HGNC:13099; P13682
18719	ZNF37A	HGNC:13102; P17032
18720	ZNF41	HGNC:13107; P51814
18721	ZNF43	HGNC:13109; P17038
18722	ZNF44	HGNC:13110; P15621
18723	ZNF45	HGNC:13111; Q02386
18724	ZNF48	HGNC:13114; Q96MX3
18725	ZNF57	HGNC:13125; Q68EA5
18726	ZNF66	HGNC:13135; Q6ZN08
18727	ZNF69	HGNC:13138; Q9UC07
18728	ZNF70	HGNC:13140; Q9UC06
18729	ZNF71	HGNC:13141; Q9NQZ8
18730	ZNF74	HGNC:13144; Q16587
18731	ZNF75A	HGNC:13146; Q96N20
18732	ZNF75D	HGNC:13145; P51815
18733	ZNF76	HGNC:13149; P36508
18734	ZNF77	HGNC:13150; Q15935
18735	ZNF79	HGNC:13153; Q15937
18736	ZNF80	HGNC:13155; P51504
18737	ZNF81	HGNC:13156; P51508
18738	ZNF83	HGNC:13158; P51522
18739	ZNF84	HGNC:13159; P51523
18740	ZNF85	HGNC:13160; Q03923
18741	ZNF90	HGNC:13165; Q03938
18742	ZNF91	HGNC:13166; Q05481
18743	ZNF92	HGNC:13168; Q03936
18744	ZNF93	HGNC:13169; P35789
18745	ZNF98	HGNC:13174; A6NK75
18746	ZNF99	HGNC:13175; A8MXY4
18747	ZNF100	HGNC:12880; Q8IYN0
18748	ZNF101	HGNC:12881; Q8IZC7
18749	ZNF106	HGNC:12886; Q9H2Y7
18750	ZNF107	HGNC:12887; Q9UII5
18751	ZNF112	HGNC:12892; Q9UJU3
18752	ZNF114	HGNC:12894; Q8NC26
18753	ZNF117	HGNC:12897; Q03924
18754	ZNF121	HGNC:12904; P58317
18755	ZNF124	HGNC:12907; Q15973
18756	ZNF131	HGNC:12915; P52739
18757	ZNF132	HGNC:12916; P52740
18758	ZNF133	HGNC:12917; P52736
18759	ZNF134	HGNC:12918; P52741
18760	ZNF135	HGNC:12919; P52742
18761	ZNF136	HGNC:12920; P52737
18762	ZNF138	HGNC:12922; P52744
18763	ZNF140	HGNC:12925; P52738
18764	ZNF141	HGNC:12926; Q15928
18765	ZNF142	HGNC:12927; P52746
18766	ZNF143	HGNC:12928; P52747
18767	ZNF146	HGNC:12931; Q15072
18768	ZNF148	HGNC:12933; Q9UQR1
18769	ZNF154	HGNC:12939; Q13106
18770	ZNF155	HGNC:12940; Q12901
18771	ZNF157	HGNC:12942; P51786
18772	ZNF160	HGNC:12948; Q9HCG1
18773	ZNF165	HGNC:12953; P49910
18774	ZNF169	HGNC:12957; Q14929
18775	ZNF174	HGNC:12963; Q15697
18776	ZNF175	HGNC:12964; Q9Y473
18777	ZNF177	HGNC:12966; Q13360
18778	ZNF180	HGNC:12970; Q9UJW8
18779	ZNF181	HGNC:12971; Q2M3W8
18780	ZNF182	HGNC:13001; P17025
18781	ZNF184	HGNC:12975; Q99676
18782	ZNF185	HGNC:12976; O15231
18783	ZNF189	HGNC:12980; O75820
18784	ZNF195	HGNC:12986; O14628
18785	ZNF197	HGNC:12988; O14709
18786	ZNF200	HGNC:12993; P98182
18787	ZNF202	HGNC:12994; O95125
18788	ZNF205	HGNC:12996; O95201
18789	ZNF207	HGNC:12998; O43670
18790	ZNF208	HGNC:12999; O43345
18791	ZNF211	HGNC:13003; Q13398
18792	ZNF212	HGNC:13004; Q9UDV6
18793	ZNF213	HGNC:13005; O14771
18794	ZNF214	HGNC:13006; Q9UL59
18795	ZNF215	HGNC:13007; Q9UL58
18796	ZNF217	HGNC:13009; O75362
18797	ZNF219	HGNC:13011; Q9P2Y4
18798	ZNF221	HGNC:13014; Q9UK13
18799	ZNF222	HGNC:13015; Q9UK12
18800	ZNF223	HGNC:13016; Q9UK11
18801	ZNF224	HGNC:13017; Q9NZL3
18802	ZNF225	HGNC:13018; Q9UK10
18803	ZNF226	HGNC:13019; Q9NYT6
18804	ZNF227	HGNC:13020; Q86WZ6
18805	ZNF229	HGNC:13022; Q9UJW7
18806	ZNF230	HGNC:13024; Q9UIE0
18807	ZNF232	HGNC:13026; Q9UNY5
18808	ZNF233	HGNC:30946; A6NK53
18809	ZNF234	HGNC:13027; Q14588
18810	ZNF235	HGNC:12866; Q14590
18811	ZNF236	HGNC:13028; Q9UL36
18812	ZNF239	HGNC:13031; Q16600
18813	ZNF248	HGNC:13041; Q8NDW4
18814	ZNF250	HGNC:13044; P15622
18815	ZNF251	HGNC:13045; Q9BRH9
18816	ZNF253	HGNC:13497; O75346
18817	ZNF254	HGNC:13047; O75437
18818	ZNF256	HGNC:13049; Q9Y2P7
18819	ZNF257	HGNC:13498; Q9Y2Q1
18820	ZNF260	HGNC:13499; Q3ZCT1
18821	ZNF263	HGNC:13056; O14978
18822	ZNF264	HGNC:13057; O43296
18823	ZNF266	HGNC:13059; Q14584
18824	ZNF267	HGNC:13060; Q14586
18825	ZNF268	HGNC:13061; Q14587
18826	ZNF273	HGNC:13067; Q14593
18827	ZNF274	HGNC:13068; Q96GC6
18828	ZNF275	HGNC:13069; Q9NSD4
18829	ZNF276	HGNC:23330; Q8N554
18830	ZNF277	HGNC:13070; Q9NRM2
18831	ZNF280A	HGNC:18597; P59817
18832	ZNF280B	HGNC:23022; Q86YH2
18833	ZNF280C	HGNC:25955; Q8ND82
18834	ZNF280D	HGNC:25953; Q6N043
18835	ZNF281	HGNC:13075; Q9Y2X9
18836	ZNF282	HGNC:13076; Q9UDV7
18837	ZNF283	HGNC:13077; Q8N7M2
18838	ZNF284	HGNC:13078; Q2VY69
18839	ZNF285	HGNC:13079; Q96NJ3
18840	ZNF286A	HGNC:13501; Q9HBT8
18841	ZNF287	HGNC:13502; Q9HBT7
18842	ZNF292	HGNC:18410; O60281
18843	ZNF296	HGNC:15981; Q8WUU4
18844	ZNF300	HGNC:13091; Q96RE9
18845	ZNF302	HGNC:13848; Q9NR11
18846	ZNF304	HGNC:13505; Q9HCX3
18847	ZNF311	HGNC:13847; Q5JNZ3
18848	ZNF316	HGNC:13843; A6NFI3
18849	ZNF317	HGNC:13507; Q96PQ6
18850	ZNF318	HGNC:13578; Q5VUA4
18851	ZNF319	HGNC:13644; Q9P2F9
18852	ZNF320	HGNC:13842; A2RRD8
18853	ZNF322	HGNC:23640; Q6U7Q0
18854	ZNF324	HGNC:14096; O75467
18855	ZNF324B	HGNC:33107; Q6AW86
18856	ZNF326	HGNC:14104; Q5BKZ1
18857	ZNF329	HGNC:14209; Q86UD4
18858	ZNF330	HGNC:15462; Q9Y3S2
18859	ZNF331	HGNC:15489; Q9NQX6
18860	ZNF333	HGNC:15624; Q96JL9
18861	ZNF334	HGNC:15806; Q9HCZ1
18862	ZNF335	HGNC:15807; Q9H4Z2
18863	ZNF337	HGNC:15809; Q9Y3M9
18864	ZNF341	HGNC:15992; Q9BYN7
18865	ZNF343	HGNC:16017; Q6P1L6
18866	ZNF345	HGNC:16367; Q14585
18867	ZNF346	HGNC:16403; Q9UL40
18868	ZNF347	HGNC:16447; Q96SE7
18869	ZNF350	HGNC:16656; Q9GZX5
18870	ZNF354A	HGNC:11628; O60765
18871	ZNF354B	HGNC:17197; Q96LW1
18872	ZNF354C	HGNC:16736; Q86Y25
18873	ZNF358	HGNC:16838; Q9NW07
18874	ZNF362	HGNC:18079; Q5T0B9
18875	ZNF365	HGNC:18194; Q70YC4, Q70YC5
18876	ZNF366	HGNC:18316; Q8N895
18877	ZNF367	HGNC:18320; Q7RTV3
18878	ZNF382	HGNC:17409; Q96SR6
18879	ZNF383	HGNC:18609; Q8NA42
18880	ZNF384	HGNC:11955; Q8TF68
18881	ZNF385A	HGNC:17521; Q96PM9
18882	ZNF385B	HGNC:26332; Q569K4
18883	ZNF385C	HGNC:33722; Q66K41
18884	ZNF385D	HGNC:26191; Q9H6B1
18885	ZNF391	HGNC:18779; Q9UJN7
18886	ZNF394	HGNC:18832; Q53GI3
18887	ZNF395	HGNC:18737; Q9H8N7
18888	ZNF396	HGNC:18824; Q96N95
18889	ZNF397	HGNC:18818; Q8NF99
18890	ZNF398	HGNC:18373; Q8TD17
18891	ZNF404	HGNC:19417; Q494X3
18892	ZNF407	HGNC:19904; Q9C0G0
18893	ZNF408	HGNC:20041; Q9H9D4
18894	ZNF410	HGNC:20144; Q86VK4
18895	ZNF414	HGNC:20630; Q96IQ9
18896	ZNF415	HGNC:20636; Q09FC8
18897	ZNF416	HGNC:20645; Q9BWM5
18898	ZNF417	HGNC:20646; Q8TAU3
18899	ZNF418	HGNC:20647; Q8TF45
18900	ZNF419	HGNC:20648; Q96HQ0
18901	ZNF420	HGNC:20649; Q8TAQ5
18902	ZNF423	HGNC:16762; Q2M1K9
18903	ZNF425	HGNC:20690; Q6IV72
18904	ZNF426	HGNC:20725; Q9BUY5
18905	ZNF428	HGNC:20804; Q96B54
18906	ZNF429	HGNC:20817; Q86V71
18907	ZNF430	HGNC:20808; Q9H8G1
18908	ZNF431	HGNC:20809; Q8TF32
18909	ZNF432	HGNC:20810; O94892
18910	ZNF433	HGNC:20811; Q8N7K0
18911	ZNF436	HGNC:20814; Q9C0F3
18912	ZNF438	HGNC:21029; Q7Z4V0
18913	ZNF439	HGNC:20873; Q8NDP4
18914	ZNF440	HGNC:20874; Q8IYI8
18915	ZNF441	HGNC:20875; Q8N8Z8
18916	ZNF442	HGNC:20877; Q9H7R0
18917	ZNF443	HGNC:20878; Q9Y2A4
18918	ZNF444	HGNC:16052; Q8N0Y2
18919	ZNF445	HGNC:21018; P59923
18920	ZNF446	HGNC:21036; Q9NWS9
18921	ZNF449	HGNC:21039; Q6P9G9
18922	ZNF451	HGNC:21091; Q9Y4E5
18923	ZNF454	HGNC:21200; Q8N9F8
18924	ZNF460	HGNC:21628; Q14592
18925	ZNF461	HGNC:21629; Q8TAF7
18926	ZNF462	HGNC:21684; Q96JM2
18927	ZNF467	HGNC:23154; Q7Z7K2
18928	ZNF468	HGNC:33105; Q5VIY5
18929	ZNF469	HGNC:23216; Q96JG9
18930	ZNF470	HGNC:22220; Q6ECI4
18931	ZNF471	HGNC:23226; Q9BX82
18932	ZNF473	HGNC:23239; Q8WTR7
18933	ZNF474	HGNC:23245; Q6S9Z5
18934	ZNF475	HGNC:53564; A0A1B0GTH9
18935	ZNF479	HGNC:23258; Q96JC4
18936	ZNF480	HGNC:23305; Q8WV37
18937	ZNF483	HGNC:23384; Q8TF39
18938	ZNF484	HGNC:23385; Q5JVG2
18939	ZNF485	HGNC:23440; Q8NCK3
18940	ZNF486	HGNC:20807; Q96H40
18941	ZNF487	HGNC:23488; B1APH4
18942	ZNF488	HGNC:23535; Q96MN9
18943	ZNF490	HGNC:23705; Q9ULM2
18944	ZNF491	HGNC:23706; Q8N8L2
18945	ZNF492	HGNC:23707; Q9P255
18946	ZNF493	HGNC:23708; Q6ZR52
18947	ZNF496	HGNC:23713; Q96IT1
18948	ZNF497	HGNC:23714; Q6ZNH5
18949	ZNF500	HGNC:23716; O60304
18950	ZNF501	HGNC:23717; Q96CX3
18951	ZNF502	HGNC:23718; Q8TBZ5
18952	ZNF503	HGNC:23589; Q96F45
18953	ZNF506	HGNC:23780; Q5JVG8
18954	ZNF507	HGNC:23783; Q8TCN5
18955	ZNF510	HGNC:29161; Q9Y2H8
18956	ZNF511	HGNC:28445; Q8NB15
18957	ZNF512	HGNC:29380; Q96ME7
18958	ZNF512B	HGNC:29212; Q96KM6
18959	ZNF513	HGNC:26498; Q8N8E2
18960	ZNF514	HGNC:25894; Q96K75
18961	ZNF516	HGNC:28990; Q92618
18962	ZNF517	HGNC:27984; Q6ZMY9
18963	ZNF518A	HGNC:29009; Q6AHZ1
18964	ZNF518B	HGNC:29365; Q9C0D4
18965	ZNF519	HGNC:30574; Q8TB69
18966	ZNF521	HGNC:24605; Q96K83
18967	ZNF524	HGNC:28322; Q96C55
18968	ZNF525	HGNC:29423; Q8N782
18969	ZNF526	HGNC:29415; Q8TF50
18970	ZNF527	HGNC:29385; Q8NB42
18971	ZNF528	HGNC:29384; Q3MIS6
18972	ZNF529	HGNC:29328; Q6P280
18973	ZNF530	HGNC:29297; Q6P9A1
18974	ZNF532	HGNC:30940; Q9HCE3
18975	ZNF534	HGNC:26337; Q76KX8
18976	ZNF536	HGNC:29025; O15090
18977	ZNF540	HGNC:25331; Q8NDQ6
18978	ZNF541	HGNC:25294; Q9H0D2
18979	ZNF543	HGNC:25281; Q08ER8
18980	ZNF544	HGNC:16759; Q6NX49
18981	ZNF546	HGNC:28671; Q86UE3
18982	ZNF547	HGNC:26432; Q8IVP9
18983	ZNF548	HGNC:26561; Q8NEK5
18984	ZNF549	HGNC:26632; Q6P9A3
18985	ZNF550	HGNC:28643; Q7Z398
18986	ZNF551	HGNC:25108; Q7Z340
18987	ZNF552	HGNC:26135; Q9H707
18988	ZNF554	HGNC:26629; Q86TJ5
18989	ZNF555	HGNC:28382; Q8NEP9
18990	ZNF556	HGNC:25669; Q9HAH1
18991	ZNF557	HGNC:28632; Q8N988
18992	ZNF558	HGNC:26422; Q96NG5
18993	ZNF559	HGNC:28197; Q9BR84
18994	ZNF560	HGNC:26484; Q96MR9
18995	ZNF561	HGNC:28684; Q8N587
18996	ZNF562	HGNC:25950; Q6V9R5
18997	ZNF563	HGNC:30498; Q8TA94
18998	ZNF564	HGNC:31106; Q8TBZ8
18999	ZNF565	HGNC:26726; Q8N9K5
19000	ZNF566	HGNC:25919; Q969W8
19001	ZNF567	HGNC:28696; Q8N184
19002	ZNF568	HGNC:25392; Q3ZCX4
19003	ZNF569	HGNC:24737; Q5MCW4
19004	ZNF570	HGNC:26416; Q96NI8
19005	ZNF571	HGNC:25000; Q7Z3V5
19006	ZNF572	HGNC:26758; Q7Z3I7
19007	ZNF573	HGNC:26420; Q86YE8
19008	ZNF574	HGNC:26166; Q6ZN55
19009	ZNF575	HGNC:27606; Q86XF7
19010	ZNF576	HGNC:28357; Q9H609
19011	ZNF577	HGNC:28673; Q9BSK1
19012	ZNF578	HGNC:26449; Q96N58
19013	ZNF579	HGNC:26646; Q8NAF0
19014	ZNF580	HGNC:29473; Q9UK33
19015	ZNF581	HGNC:25017; Q9P0T4
19016	ZNF582	HGNC:26421; Q96NG8
19017	ZNF583	HGNC:26427; Q96ND8
19018	ZNF584	HGNC:27318; Q8IVC4
19019	ZNF585A	HGNC:26305; Q6P3V2
19020	ZNF585B	HGNC:30948; Q52M93
19021	ZNF586	HGNC:25949; Q9NXT0
19022	ZNF587	HGNC:30955; Q96SQ5
19023	ZNF587B	HGNC:37142; E7ETH6
19024	ZNF589	HGNC:16747; Q86UQ0
19025	ZNF592	HGNC:28986; Q92610
19026	ZNF593	HGNC:30943; O00488
19027	ZNF593OS	HGNC:41278; A0A0U1RRA0
19028	ZNF594	HGNC:29392; Q96JF6
19029	ZNF595	HGNC:27196; Q8IYB9
19030	ZNF596	HGNC:27268; Q8TC21
19031	ZNF597	HGNC:26573; Q96LX8
19032	ZNF598	HGNC:28079; Q86UK7
19033	ZNF599	HGNC:26408; Q96NL3
19034	ZNF600	HGNC:30951; Q6ZNG1
19035	ZNF605	HGNC:28068; Q86T29
19036	ZNF606	HGNC:25879; Q8WXB4
19037	ZNF607	HGNC:28192; Q96SK3
19038	ZNF608	HGNC:29238; Q9ULD9
19039	ZNF609	HGNC:29003; O15014
19040	ZNF610	HGNC:26687; Q8N9Z0
19041	ZNF611	HGNC:28766; Q8N823
19042	ZNF613	HGNC:25827; Q6PF04
19043	ZNF614	HGNC:24722; Q8N883
19044	ZNF615	HGNC:24740; Q8N8J6
19045	ZNF616	HGNC:28062; Q08AN1
19046	ZNF618	HGNC:29416; Q5T7W0
19047	ZNF619	HGNC:26910; Q8N2I2
19048	ZNF620	HGNC:28742; Q6ZNG0
19049	ZNF621	HGNC:24787; Q6ZSS3
19050	ZNF622	HGNC:30958; Q969S3
19051	ZNF623	HGNC:29084; O75123
19052	ZNF624	HGNC:29254; Q9P2J8
19053	ZNF625	HGNC:30571; Q96I27
19054	ZNF626	HGNC:30461; Q68DY1
19055	ZNF627	HGNC:30570; Q7L945
19056	ZNF628	HGNC:28054; Q5EBL2
19057	ZNF629	HGNC:29008; Q9UEG4
19058	ZNF630	HGNC:28855; Q2M218
19059	ZNF638	HGNC:17894; Q14966
19060	ZNF639	HGNC:30950; Q9UID6
19061	ZNF641	HGNC:31834; Q96N77
19062	ZNF644	HGNC:29222; Q9H582
19063	ZNF646	HGNC:29004; O15015
19064	ZNF648	HGNC:18190; Q5T619
19065	ZNF649	HGNC:25741; Q9BS31
19066	ZNF652	HGNC:29147; Q9Y2D9
19067	ZNF653	HGNC:25196; Q96CK0
19068	ZNF654	HGNC:25612; Q8IZM8
19069	ZNF655	HGNC:30899; Q8N720
19070	ZNF658	HGNC:25226; Q5TYW1
19071	ZNF660	HGNC:26720; Q6AZW8
19072	ZNF662	HGNC:31930; Q6ZS27
19073	ZNF664	HGNC:25406; Q8N3J9
19074	ZNF665	HGNC:25885; Q9H7R5
19075	ZNF667	HGNC:28854; Q5HYK9
19076	ZNF668	HGNC:25821; Q96K58
19077	ZNF669	HGNC:25736; Q96BR6
19078	ZNF670	HGNC:28167; Q9BS34
19079	ZNF671	HGNC:26279; Q8TAW3
19080	ZNF672	HGNC:26179; Q499Z4
19081	ZNF674	HGNC:17625; Q2M3X9
19082	ZNF675	HGNC:30768; Q8TD23
19083	ZNF676	HGNC:20429; Q8N7Q3
19084	ZNF677	HGNC:28730; Q86XU0
19085	ZNF678	HGNC:28652; Q5SXM1
19086	ZNF679	HGNC:28650; Q8IYX0
19087	ZNF680	HGNC:26897; Q8NEM1
19088	ZNF681	HGNC:26457; Q96N22
19089	ZNF682	HGNC:28857; O95780
19090	ZNF683	HGNC:28495; Q8IZ20
19091	ZNF684	HGNC:28418; Q5T5D7
19092	ZNF687	HGNC:29277; Q8N1G0
19093	ZNF688	HGNC:30489; P0C7X2
19094	ZNF689	HGNC:25173; C0HLU2, Q96CS4
19095	ZNF691	HGNC:28028; Q5VV52
19096	ZNF692	HGNC:26049; Q9BU19
19097	ZNF695	HGNC:30954; Q8IW36
19098	ZNF696	HGNC:25872; Q9H7X3
19099	ZNF697	HGNC:32034; Q5TEC3
19100	ZNF699	HGNC:24750; Q32M78
19101	ZNF700	HGNC:25292; Q9H0M5
19102	ZNF701	HGNC:25597; Q9NV72
19103	ZNF703	HGNC:25883; Q9H7S9
19104	ZNF704	HGNC:32291; Q6ZNC4
19105	ZNF705A	HGNC:32281; Q6ZN79
19106	ZNF705B	HGNC:32284; P0CI00
19107	ZNF705D	HGNC:33202; P0CH99
19108	ZNF705G	HGNC:37134; A8MUZ8
19109	ZNF706	HGNC:24992; Q9Y5V0
19110	ZNF707	HGNC:27815; Q96C28
19111	ZNF708	HGNC:12945; P17019
19112	ZNF709	HGNC:20629; Q8N972
19113	ZNF710	HGNC:25352; Q8N1W2
19114	ZNF711	HGNC:13128; Q9Y462
19115	ZNF713	HGNC:22043; Q8N859
19116	ZNF714	HGNC:27124; Q96N38
19117	ZNF716	HGNC:32458; A6NP11
19118	ZNF717	HGNC:29448; Q9BY31
19119	ZNF718	HGNC:26889; Q3SXZ3
19120	ZNF721	HGNC:29425; Q8TF20
19121	ZNF722	HGNC:22571; A0A1W2PQL4
19122	ZNF723	HGNC:32286; P0DPD5
19123	ZNF724	HGNC:32460; A8MTY0
19124	ZNF726	HGNC:32462; A6NNF4
19125	ZNF727	HGNC:22785; A8MUV8
19126	ZNF728	HGNC:32463; P0DKX0
19127	ZNF729	HGNC:32464; A6NN14
19128	ZNF730	HGNC:32470; Q6ZMV8
19129	ZNF732	HGNC:37138; B4DXR9
19130	ZNF735	HGNC:32466; P0CB33
19131	ZNF736	HGNC:32467; B4DX44
19132	ZNF737	HGNC:32468; O75373
19133	ZNF738	HGNC:32469; Q8NE65
19134	ZNF740	HGNC:27465; Q8NDX6
19135	ZNF746	HGNC:21948; Q6NUN9
19136	ZNF747	HGNC:28350; Q9BV97
19137	ZNF749	HGNC:32783; O43361
19138	ZNF750	HGNC:25843; Q32MQ0
19139	ZNF761	HGNC:23179; Q86XN6
19140	ZNF763	HGNC:27614; Q0D2J5
19141	ZNF764	HGNC:28200; Q96H86
19142	ZNF765	HGNC:25092; Q7L2R6
19143	ZNF766	HGNC:28063; Q5HY98
19144	ZNF768	HGNC:26273; Q9H5H4
19145	ZNF770	HGNC:26061; Q6IQ21
19146	ZNF771	HGNC:29653; Q7L3S4
19147	ZNF772	HGNC:33106; Q68DY9
19148	ZNF773	HGNC:30487; Q6PK81
19149	ZNF774	HGNC:33108; Q6NX45
19150	ZNF775	HGNC:28501; Q96BV0
19151	ZNF776	HGNC:26765; Q68DI1
19152	ZNF777	HGNC:22213; Q9ULD5
19153	ZNF778	HGNC:26479; Q96MU6
19154	ZNF780A	HGNC:27603; O75290
19155	ZNF780B	HGNC:33109; Q9Y6R6
19156	ZNF781	HGNC:26745; Q8N8C0
19157	ZNF782	HGNC:33110; Q6ZMW2
19158	ZNF783	HGNC:27222; Q6ZMS7
19159	ZNF784	HGNC:33111; Q8NCA9
19160	ZNF785	HGNC:26496; A8K8V0
19161	ZNF786	HGNC:21806; Q8N393
19162	ZNF787	HGNC:26998; Q6DD87
19163	ZNF789	HGNC:27801; Q5FWF6
19164	ZNF790	HGNC:33114; Q6PG37
19165	ZNF791	HGNC:26895; Q3KP31
19166	ZNF792	HGNC:24751; Q3KQV3
19167	ZNF793	HGNC:33115; Q6ZN11
19168	ZNF799	HGNC:28071; Q96GE5
19169	ZNF800	HGNC:27267; Q2TB10
19170	ZNF804A	HGNC:21711; Q7Z570
19171	ZNF804B	HGNC:21958; A4D1E1
19172	ZNF805	HGNC:23272; Q5CZA5
19173	ZNF808	HGNC:33230; Q8N4W9
19174	ZNF813	HGNC:33257; Q6ZN06
19175	ZNF814	HGNC:33258; B7Z6K7
19176	ZNF816	HGNC:26995; Q0VGE8
19177	ZNF821	HGNC:28043; O75541
19178	ZNF823	HGNC:30936; P16415
19179	ZNF827	HGNC:27193; Q17R98
19180	ZNF829	HGNC:34032; Q3KNS6
19181	ZNF830	HGNC:28291; Q96NB3
19182	ZNF831	HGNC:16167; Q5JPB2
19183	ZNF835	HGNC:34332; Q9Y2P0
19184	ZNF836	HGNC:34333; Q6ZNA1
19185	ZNF837	HGNC:25164; Q96EG3
19186	ZNF839	HGNC:20345; A8K0R7
19187	ZNF841	HGNC:27611; Q6ZN19
19188	ZNF843	HGNC:28710; Q8N446
19189	ZNF844	HGNC:25932; Q08AG5
19190	ZNF845	HGNC:25112; Q96IR2
19191	ZNF846	HGNC:27260; Q147U1
19192	ZNF850	HGNC:27994; A8MQ14
19193	ZNF852	HGNC:27713; Q6ZMS4
19194	ZNF853	HGNC:21767; P0CG23
19195	ZNF860	HGNC:34513; A6NHJ4
19196	ZNF862	HGNC:34519; O60290
19197	ZNF865	HGNC:38705; P0CJ78
19198	ZNF875	HGNC:4928; P10072
19199	ZNF878	HGNC:37246; C9JN71
19200	ZNF879	HGNC:37273; B4DU55
19201	ZNF880	HGNC:37249; Q6PDB4
19202	ZNF883	HGNC:27271; P0CG24
19203	ZNF888	HGNC:38695; P0CJ79
19204	ZNF891	HGNC:38709; A8MT65
19205	ZNF892	HGNC:38707; A0A087WUV0
19206	ZNFX1	HGNC:29271; Q9P2E3
19207	ZNG1A	HGNC:17134; Q9BRT8
19208	ZNG1B	HGNC:17907; Q8IUF1
19209	ZNG1C	HGNC:18519; Q5JTY5
19210	ZNG1E	HGNC:24584; Q5RIA9
19211	ZNG1F	HGNC:31978; Q4V339
19212	ZNHIT1	HGNC:21688; O43257
19213	ZNHIT2	HGNC:1177; Q9UHR6
19214	ZNHIT3	HGNC:12309; Q15649
19215	ZNHIT6	HGNC:26089; Q9NWK9
19216	ZNRD2	HGNC:11328; O60232
19217	ZNRF1	HGNC:18452; Q8ND25
19218	ZNRF2	HGNC:22316; Q8NHG8
19219	ZNRF3	HGNC:18126; Q9ULT6
19220	ZNRF4	HGNC:17726; Q8WWF5
19221	ZP1	HGNC:13187; P60852
19222	ZP2	HGNC:13188; Q05996
19223	ZP3	HGNC:13189; P21754
19224	ZP4	HGNC:15770; Q12836
19225	ZPBP	HGNC:15662; Q9BS86
19226	ZPBP2	HGNC:20678; Q6X784
19227	ZPLD1	HGNC:27022; Q8TCW7
19228	ZPR1	HGNC:13051; O75312
19229	ZRANB1	HGNC:18224; Q9UGI0
19230	ZRANB2	HGNC:13058; O95218
19231	ZRANB3	HGNC:25249; Q5FWF4
19232	ZRSR2	HGNC:23019; Q15696
19233	ZSCAN1	HGNC:23712; Q8NBB4
19234	ZSCAN2	HGNC:20994; Q7Z7L9
19235	ZSCAN4	HGNC:23709; Q8NAM6
19236	ZSCAN5A	HGNC:23710; Q9BUG6
19237	ZSCAN5B	HGNC:34246; A6NJL1
19238	ZSCAN5C	HGNC:34294; A6NGD5
19239	ZSCAN9	HGNC:12984; O15535
19240	ZSCAN10	HGNC:12997; Q96SZ4
19241	ZSCAN12	HGNC:13172; O43309
19242	ZSCAN16	HGNC:20813; Q9H4T2
19243	ZSCAN18	HGNC:21037; Q8TBC5
19244	ZSCAN20	HGNC:13093; P17040
19245	ZSCAN21	HGNC:13104; Q9Y5A6
19246	ZSCAN22	HGNC:4929; P10073
19247	ZSCAN23	HGNC:21193; Q3MJ62
19248	ZSCAN25	HGNC:21961; Q6NSZ9
19249	ZSCAN26	HGNC:12978; Q16670
19250	ZSCAN29	HGNC:26673; Q8IWY8
19251	ZSCAN30	HGNC:33517; Q86W11
19252	ZSCAN31	HGNC:14097; Q96LW9
19253	ZSCAN32	HGNC:20812; Q9NX65
19254	ZSWIM1	HGNC:16155; Q9BR11
19255	ZSWIM2	HGNC:30990; Q8NEG5
19256	ZSWIM3	HGNC:16157; Q96MP5
19257	ZSWIM4	HGNC:25704; Q9H7M6
19258	ZSWIM5	HGNC:29299; Q9P217
19259	ZSWIM6	HGNC:29316; Q9HCJ5
19260	ZSWIM7	HGNC:26993; Q19AV6
19261	ZSWIM8	HGNC:23528; A7E2V4
19262	ZSWIM9	HGNC:34495; Q86XI8
19263	ZUP1	HGNC:21224; Q96AP4
19264	ZW10	HGNC:13194; O43264
19265	ZWILCH	HGNC:25468; Q9H900
19266	ZWINT	HGNC:13195; O95229
19267	ZXDA	HGNC:13198; P98168
19268	ZXDB	HGNC:13199; P98169
19269	ZXDC	HGNC:28160; Q2QGD7
19270	ZYG11A	HGNC:32058; Q6WRX3
19271	ZYG11B	HGNC:25820; Q9C0D3
19272	ZYX	HGNC:13200; Q15942
19273	ZZEF1	HGNC:29027; O43149
19274	ZZZ3	HGNC:24523; Q8IYH5
