= ZFAND5 =

Protein-coding gene in the species Homo sapiens

Identifiers
- Aliases: ZFAND5, ZA20D2, ZFAND5A, ZNF216, zinc finger AN1-type containing 5
- External IDs: OMIM: 604761; MGI: 1278334; GeneCards: ZFAND5

Gene location (Human)
Chr.	Chromosome 9 (human)
Band	9q21.13	Start	72,351,413 bp
Band	9q21.13	End	72,365,235 bp

Gene location (Mouse)
Chr.	Chromosome 19 (mouse)
Band	19 B|19 14.32 cM	Start	21,249,642 bp
Band	19 B|19 14.32 cM	End	21,264,204 bp
RNA expression pattern
Bgee	Human / Mouse (ortholog); Top expressed in: mucosa of paranasal sinus; gastric mucosa; seminal vesicula; Skeletal muscle tissue of rectus abdominis; right lung; oocyte; tibial nerve; tibia; biceps brachii; Skeletal muscle tissue of biceps brachii / Top expressed in: habenula; extensor digitorum longus muscle; triceps brachii muscle; medial head of gastrocnemius muscle; muscle of thigh; plantaris muscle; vastus lateralis muscle; sternocleidomastoid muscle; thoracic diaphragm; digastric muscle; More reference expression data
BioGPS	n/a
Gene ontology
Molecular function	DNA binding; zinc ion binding; protein binding; metal ion binding; molecular function
Cellular component	cytoplasm; cellular component
Biological process	fibroblast migration; skeletal system morphogenesis; platelet-derived growth factor receptor signaling pathway; face development; respiratory system process; vasculature development; in utero embryonic development; smooth muscle tissue development; biological process
Sources:Amigo / QuickGO
Orthologs
Databases	NCBI: entry; OMA: entry
Species	Human	Mouse
Entrez	7763	22682
Ensembl	ENSG00000107372	ENSMUSG00000024750
UniProt	O76080	O88878
RefSeq (mRNA)	NM_006007; NM_001102420; NM_001102421; NM_001278243; NM_001278244 NM_001278245	NM_009551
RefSeq (protein)	NP_001095890; NP_001095891; NP_001265172; NP_001265173; NP_001265174 NP_005998	NP_033577
Location (UCSC)	Chr 9: 72.35 – 72.37 Mb	Chr 19: 21.25 – 21.26 Mb
PubMed search
- Wikidata
View/Edit Human	View/Edit Mouse

Zinc finger AN1-type containing 5 is a protein that in humans is encoded by the ZFAND5 gene.
