= VWA5A =

Protein

Identifiers
- Aliases: VWA5A, BCSC-1, BCSC1, LOH11CR2A, von Willebrand factor A domain containing 5A
- External IDs: OMIM: 602929; MGI: 1915026; HomoloGene: 18222; GeneCards: VWA5A; OMA:VWA5A - orthologs

Gene location (Human)
Chr.	Chromosome 11 (human)
Band	11q24.2	Start	124,115,404 bp
Band	11q24.2	End	124,147,721 bp

Gene location (Mouse)
Chr.	Chromosome 9 (mouse)
Band	9|9 A5.1	Start	38,629,564 bp
Band	9|9 A5.1	End	38,654,633 bp
RNA expression pattern
Bgee	Human / Mouse (ortholog); Top expressed in: islet of Langerhans; amniotic fluid; rectum; gallbladder; anterior pituitary; pancreatic ductal cell; palpebral conjunctiva; mucosa of ileum; mucosa of transverse colon; Achilles tendon / Top expressed in: stroma of bone marrow; lumbar spinal ganglion; umbilical cord; lens; uterus; calvaria; molar; right lung lobe; left lung lobe; dermis; More reference expression data
BioGPS	n/a
Orthologs
Species	Human	Mouse
Entrez	4013	67776
Ensembl	ENSG00000110002	ENSMUSG00000023186
UniProt	O00534	Q99KC8
RefSeq (mRNA)	NM_001130142; NM_014622; NM_198315	NM_001145957; NM_172767
RefSeq (protein)	NP_001123614; NP_055437; NP_938057	NP_001139429; NP_766355
Location (UCSC)	Chr 11: 124.12 – 124.15 Mb	Chr 9: 38.63 – 38.65 Mb
PubMed search
- Wikidata
View/Edit Human	View/Edit Mouse

Von Willebrand factor A domain containing 5A is a protein that in humans is encoded by the VWA5A gene.
