= ZNF281 =

Protein-coding gene in humans

Identifiers
- Aliases: ZNF281, ZBP-99, ZNP-99, zinc finger protein 281, ZBP99, GZP1
- External IDs: MGI: 3029290; GeneCards: ZNF281

Gene location (Human)
Chr.	Chromosome 1 (human)
Band	1q32.1	Start	200,404,940 bp
Band	1q32.1	End	200,410,056 bp

Gene location (Mouse)
Chr.	Chromosome 1 (mouse)
Band	1|1 E4	Start	136,552,639 bp
Band	1|1 E4	End	136,557,791 bp
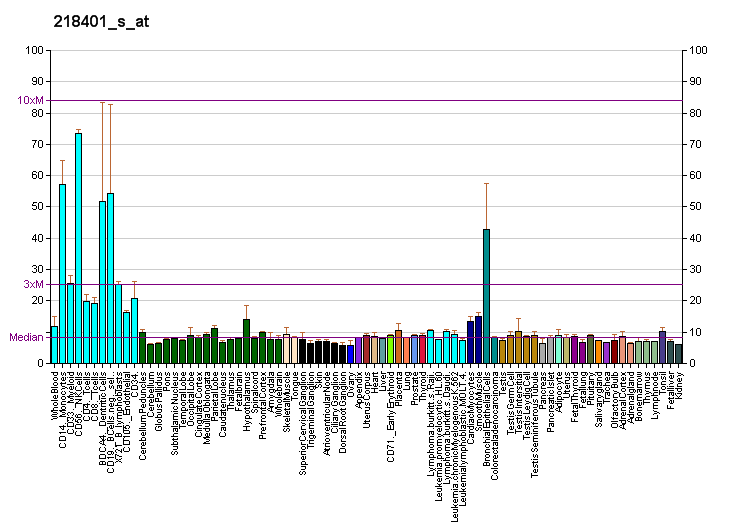
RNA expression pattern
Bgee	Human / Mouse (ortholog); Top expressed in: secondary oocyte; endothelial cell; cerebellar vermis; Brodmann area 23; trabecular bone; buccal mucosa cell; inferior ganglion of vagus nerve; visceral pleura; Skeletal muscle tissue of rectus abdominis; germinal epithelium / Top expressed in: olfactory tubercle; mandibular prominence; ascending aorta; maxillary prominence; superior cervical ganglion; hand; aortic valve; medial geniculate nucleus; lateral septal nucleus; substantia nigra; More reference expression data
BioGPS	More reference expression data
Gene ontology
Molecular function	sequence-specific DNA binding; DNA binding; transcription corepressor activity; DNA-binding transcription factor activity; metal ion binding; RNA polymerase II cis-regulatory region sequence-specific DNA binding; DNA-binding transcription repressor activity, RNA polymerase II-specific; protein binding; nucleic acid binding; DNA-binding transcription factor activity, RNA polymerase II-specific
Cellular component	nucleoplasm; nucleus
Biological process	cell differentiation; regulation of transcription, DNA-templated; embryonic body morphogenesis; negative regulation of transcription by RNA polymerase II; negative regulation of gene expression; transcription, DNA-templated; stem cell differentiation; positive regulation of transcription, DNA-templated; negative regulation of transcription, DNA-templated
Sources:Amigo / QuickGO
Orthologs
Databases	NCBI: entry; OMA: entry
Species	Human	Mouse
Entrez	23528	226442
Ensembl	ENSG00000162702	ENSMUSG00000041483
UniProt	Q9Y2X9	Q99LI5
RefSeq (mRNA)	NM_012482; NM_001281293; NM_001281294	NM_001160251; NM_177643
RefSeq (protein)	NP_001268222; NP_001268223; NP_036614	NP_001153723; NP_808311
Location (UCSC)	Chr 1: 200.4 – 200.41 Mb	Chr 1: 136.55 – 136.56 Mb
PubMed search
- Wikidata
View/Edit Human	View/Edit Mouse

Zinc finger protein 281 is a protein that in humans is encoded by the ZNF281 gene.

== See also ==
- Zinc finger
