= VSIG8 =

Protein-coding gene in humans

Identifiers
- Aliases: VSIG8, V-set and immunoglobulin domain containing 8
- External IDs: MGI: 3642995; GeneCards: VSIG8

Gene location (Human)
Chr.	Chromosome 1 (human)
Band	1q23.2	Start	159,854,316 bp
Band	1q23.2	End	159,862,657 bp

Gene location (Mouse)
Chr.	Chromosome 1 (mouse)
Band	1|1 H3	Start	172,383,505 bp
Band	1|1 H3	End	172,391,284 bp
RNA expression pattern
Bgee	Human / Mouse (ortholog); Top expressed in: skin of leg; skin of abdomen; human kidney; right uterine tube; cerebellum; cerebellar cortex; cerebellar hemisphere; right hemisphere of cerebellum; tonsil; blood / Top expressed in: lip; esophagus; skin of abdomen; hair follicle; skin of back; embryo; skin of external ear; dentate gyrus of hippocampal formation granule cell; habenula; proximal tubule; More reference expression data
BioGPS	n/a
Orthologs
Databases	NCBI: entry; OMA: entry
Species	Human	Mouse
Entrez	391123	240916
Ensembl	ENSG00000243284	ENSMUSG00000049598
UniProt	P0DPA2	Q6P3A4
RefSeq (mRNA)	NM_001013661	NM_177723
RefSeq (protein)	NP_001013683	NP_808391
Location (UCSC)	Chr 1: 159.85 – 159.86 Mb	Chr 1: 172.38 – 172.39 Mb
PubMed search
- Wikidata
View/Edit Human	View/Edit Mouse

V-set and immunoglobulin domain containing 8 is a protein that in humans is encoded by the VSIG8 gene.
