= VMA22 =

Protein found in humans

An Error has occurred retrieving Wikidata item for infobox

Vacuolar ATPase assembly protein VMA22 is a protein that in humans is encoded by the VMA22 gene (formerly CCDC115).

== Function ==
The protein encoded by this gene has been observed to localize to the endoplasmic reticulum (ER)-Golgi intermediate compartment (ERGIC) and coat protein complex I (COPI) vesicles in some human cells. The encoded protein shares some homology with the yeast V-ATPase assembly factor Vma22p, and the orthologous protein in mouse promotes cell proliferation and suppresses cell death. Defects in this gene are a cause of congenital disorder of glycosylation, type IIo in humans. [provided by RefSeq, Mar 2016].
