= ZNF346 =

Protein-coding gene in the species Homo sapiens

Identifiers
- Aliases: ZNF346, JAZ, Zfp346, zinc finger protein 346
- External IDs: OMIM: 605308; MGI: 1349417; GeneCards: ZNF346
Available structures
PDB	Ortholog search: PDBe RCSB
PDB	List of PDB id codes 2MKD, 2MKN

Gene location (Human)
Chr.	Chromosome 5 (human)
Band	5q35.2	Start	177,022,696 bp
Band	5q35.2	End	177,081,189 bp

Gene location (Mouse)
Chr.	Chromosome 13 (mouse)
Band	13|13 B1	Start	55,105,311 bp
Band	13|13 B1	End	55,134,825 bp
RNA expression pattern
Bgee	Human / Mouse (ortholog); Top expressed in: pancreatic ductal cell; buccal mucosa cell; ventricular zone; sural nerve; ganglionic eminence; tendon of biceps brachii; gonad; Achilles tendon; muscle of thigh; tibialis anterior muscle / Top expressed in: tail of embryo; neural layer of retina; genital tubercle; spermatocyte; extraocular muscle; superior frontal gyrus; thymus; cerebellar cortex; muscle of thigh; primary visual cortex; More reference expression data
BioGPS	n/a
Gene ontology
Molecular function	enzyme binding; double-stranded RNA binding; zinc ion binding; p53 binding; protein binding; metal ion binding; nucleic acid binding; RNA binding; miRNA binding
Cellular component	cytoplasm; nucleolus; nucleus
Biological process	intrinsic apoptotic signaling pathway by p53 class mediator; positive regulation of apoptotic process
Sources:Amigo / QuickGO
Orthologs
Databases	NCBI: entry; OMA: entry
Species	Human	Mouse
Entrez	23567	26919
Ensembl	ENSG00000113761	ENSMUSG00000021481
UniProt	Q9UL40	Q9R0B7
RefSeq (mRNA)	NM_001308213; NM_001308214; NM_001308215; NM_001308216; NM_001308218 NM_001308219; NM_001308221; NM_001308223; NM_012279; NM_001363713	NM_012017
RefSeq (protein)	NP_001295142; NP_001295143; NP_001295144; NP_001295145; NP_001295147 NP_001295148; NP_001295150; NP_001295152; NP_036411; NP_001350642	NP_036147; NP_001365863; NP_001365864
Location (UCSC)	Chr 5: 177.02 – 177.08 Mb	Chr 13: 55.11 – 55.13 Mb
PubMed search
- Wikidata
View/Edit Human	View/Edit Mouse

Zinc finger protein 346 is a protein that in humans is encoded by the ZNF346 gene.

The protein encoded by this gene is a nucleolar, zinc finger protein that preferentially binds to double-stranded (ds) RNA or RNA/DNA hybrids, rather than DNA alone. Mutational studies indicate that the zinc finger domains are not only essential for dsRNA binding, but are also required for its nucleolar localization. The encoded protein may be involved in cell growth and survival.
