= ZNF33B =

Protein-coding gene in the species Homo sapiens

Identifiers
- Aliases: ZNF33B, KOX2, KOX31, ZNF11B, zinc finger protein 33B
- External IDs: OMIM: 194522; GeneCards: ZNF33B

Gene location (Human)
Chr.	Chromosome 10 (human)
Band	10q11.21	Start	42,574,185 bp
Band	10q11.21	End	42,638,570 bp
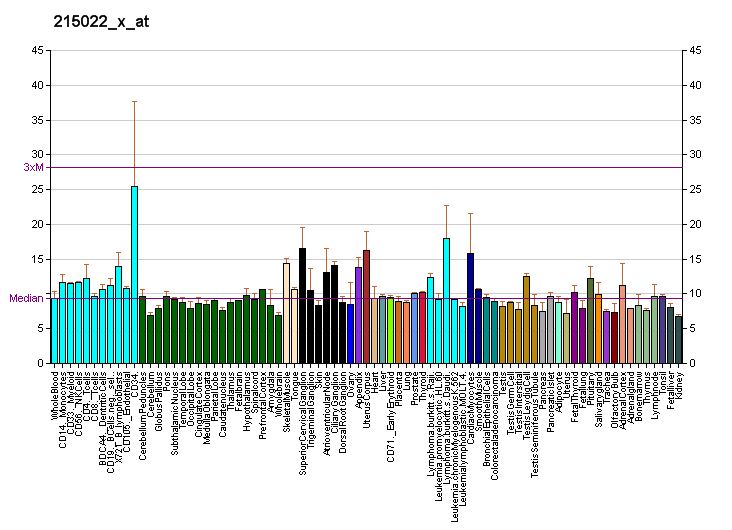
RNA expression pattern
Bgee	Human / Mouse (ortholog); Top expressed in: body of pancreas; right uterine tube; ganglionic eminence; left ovary; islet of Langerhans; buccal mucosa cell; cerebellar hemisphere; germinal epithelium; minor salivary glands; Achilles tendon / n/a; More reference expression data
BioGPS	More reference expression data
Gene ontology
Molecular function	DNA-binding transcription factor activity; DNA binding; metal ion binding; nucleic acid binding; protein binding; DNA-binding transcription factor activity, RNA polymerase II-specific
Cellular component	intracellular anatomical structure; nucleus
Biological process	regulation of transcription, DNA-templated; transcription, DNA-templated; regulation of transcription by RNA polymerase II
Sources:Amigo / QuickGO
Orthologs
Databases	NCBI: entry; OMA: entry
Species	Human	Mouse
Entrez	7582	n/a
Ensembl	ENSG00000196693	n/a
UniProt	Q06732	n/a
RefSeq (mRNA)	NM_001305033; NM_001305035; NM_001305036; NM_001305037; NM_001305038 NM_001305039; NM_001305040; NM_006955	n/a
RefSeq (protein)	NP_001291962; NP_001291964; NP_001291965; NP_001291966; NP_001291967 NP_001291968; NP_001291969; NP_008886	n/a
Location (UCSC)	Chr 10: 42.57 – 42.64 Mb	n/a
PubMed search		n/a
- Wikidata
View/Edit Human

Zinc finger protein 33B is a protein that in humans is encoded by the ZNF33B gene.
