= ZNF267 =

Protein-coding gene in the species Homo sapiens

Identifiers
- Aliases: ZNF267, HZF2, zinc finger protein 267
- External IDs: OMIM: 604752; MGI: 1098769; GeneCards: ZNF267

Gene location (Human)
Chr.	Chromosome 16 (human)
Band	16p11.2	Start	31,873,807 bp
Band	16p11.2	End	31,917,357 bp

Gene location (Mouse)
Chr.	Chromosome 3 (mouse)
Band	3 B|3 17.41 cM	Start	36,205,166 bp
Band	3 B|3 17.41 cM	End	36,224,491 bp
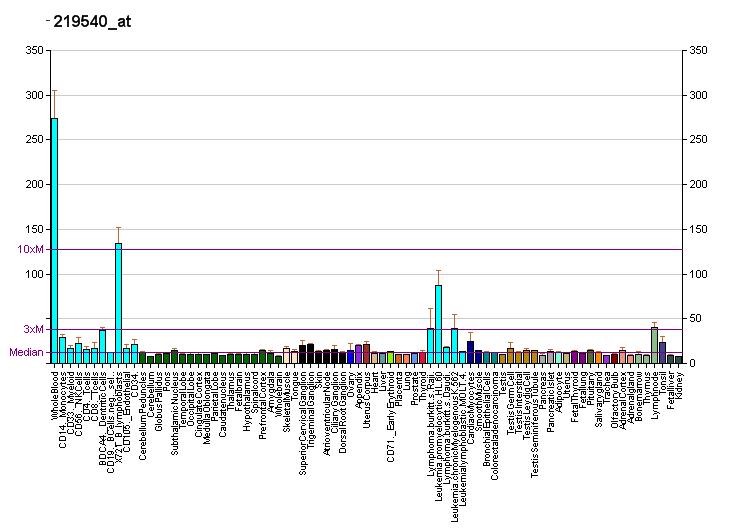
RNA expression pattern
Bgee	Human / Mouse (ortholog); Top expressed in: oocyte; epithelium of nasopharynx; secondary oocyte; monocyte; Achilles tendon; gonad; testicle; epithelium of colon; amniotic fluid; blood / Top expressed in: Rostral migratory stream; hand; superior cervical ganglion; supraoptic nucleus; ventromedial nucleus; mammillary body; lateral hypothalamus; Epithelium of choroid plexus; aortic valve; medial ganglionic eminence; More reference expression data
BioGPS	More reference expression data
Gene ontology
Molecular function	DNA-binding transcription factor activity; DNA binding; metal ion binding; nucleic acid binding; DNA-binding transcription factor activity, RNA polymerase II-specific
Cellular component	intracellular anatomical structure; nucleus
Biological process	multicellular organism development; regulation of transcription, DNA-templated; transcription, DNA-templated; regulation of transcription by RNA polymerase II
Sources:Amigo / QuickGO
Orthologs
Databases	NCBI: entry; OMA: entry
Species	Human	Mouse
Entrez	10308	241944
Ensembl	ENSG00000185947	ENSMUSG00000033883
UniProt	Q14586	n/a
RefSeq (mRNA)	NM_001265588; NM_003414	NM_001101478
RefSeq (protein)	NP_001252517; NP_003405	n/a
Location (UCSC)	Chr 16: 31.87 – 31.92 Mb	Chr 3: 36.21 – 36.22 Mb
PubMed search
- Wikidata
View/Edit Human	View/Edit Mouse

Zinc finger protein 267 is a protein that in humans is encoded by the ZNF267 gene.
