= ZNF219 =

Protein-coding gene in humans

Identifiers
- Aliases: ZNF219, ZFP219, zinc finger protein 219
- External IDs: OMIM: 605036; MGI: 1917140; GeneCards: ZNF219

Gene location (Human)
Chr.	Chromosome 14 (human)
Band	14q11.2	Start	21,090,077 bp
Band	14q11.2	End	21,104,722 bp

Gene location (Mouse)
Chr.	Chromosome 14 (mouse)
Band	14|14 C2	Start	52,243,534 bp
Band	14|14 C2	End	52,258,190 bp
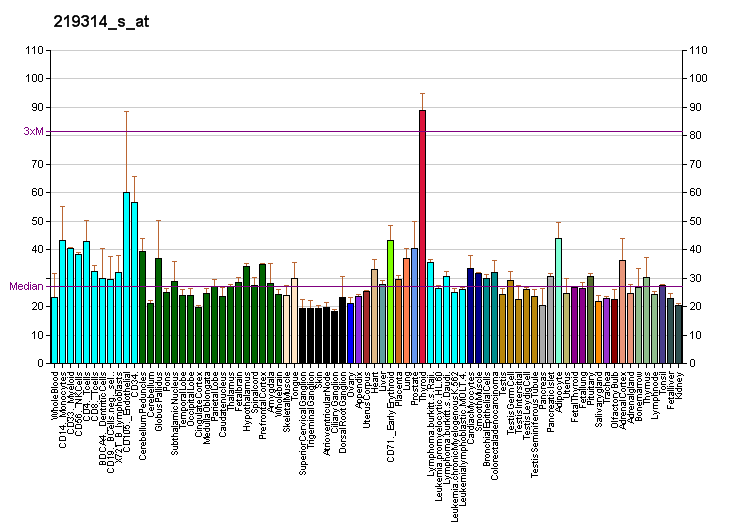
RNA expression pattern
Bgee	Human / Mouse (ortholog); Top expressed in: right adrenal gland; right adrenal cortex; left adrenal cortex; muscle layer of sigmoid colon; right hemisphere of cerebellum; apex of heart; mucosa of transverse colon; skin of leg; gastric mucosa; skin of abdomen / Top expressed in: ventricular zone; otic vesicle; saccule; cerebellar cortex; lip; thymus; neural layer of retina; otic placode; ascending aorta; aortic valve; More reference expression data
BioGPS	More reference expression data
Gene ontology
Molecular function	DNA-binding transcription factor activity; RNA polymerase II cis-regulatory region sequence-specific DNA binding; DNA binding; DNA-binding transcription repressor activity, RNA polymerase II-specific; histamine receptor activity; protein binding; metal ion binding; nucleic acid binding; DNA-binding transcription factor activity, RNA polymerase II-specific
Cellular component	integral component of membrane; nucleus
Biological process	multicellular organism development; G protein-coupled receptor signaling pathway; regulation of neurotransmitter levels; negative regulation of transcription, DNA-templated; regulation of transcription, DNA-templated; negative regulation of transcription by RNA polymerase II; transcription, DNA-templated; signal transduction; positive regulation of chondrocyte differentiation; positive regulation of transcription by RNA polymerase II; limb bud formation
Sources:Amigo / QuickGO
Orthologs
Databases	NCBI: entry; OMA: entry
Species	Human	Mouse
Entrez	51222	69890
Ensembl	ENSG00000165804	ENSMUSG00000049295
UniProt	Q9P2Y4	Q6IQX8
RefSeq (mRNA)	NM_001101672; NM_001102454; NM_016423	NM_001253694; NM_001253695; NM_001253696; NM_027248
RefSeq (protein)	NP_001095142; NP_001095924; NP_057507	NP_001240623; NP_001240624; NP_001240625; NP_081524
Location (UCSC)	Chr 14: 21.09 – 21.1 Mb	Chr 14: 52.24 – 52.26 Mb
PubMed search
- Wikidata
View/Edit Human	View/Edit Mouse

Zinc finger protein 219 is a protein that in humans is encoded by the ZNF219 gene.
