= Zinc finger protein 157 =

Protein found in humans

ZNF157

Identifiers
- Aliases: ZNF157, HZF22, zinc finger protein 157
- External IDs: OMIM: 300024; GeneCards: ZNF157

Gene location (Human)
Chr.	X chromosome (human)
Band	Xp11.3	Start	47,370,578 bp
Band	Xp11.3	End	47,414,498 bp
RNA expression pattern
Bgee	Human / Mouse (ortholog); Top expressed in: ventricular zone; ganglionic eminence; right uterine tube; gonad; olfactory zone of nasal mucosa; islet of Langerhans; cerebellar cortex; cerebellar hemisphere; right hemisphere of cerebellum; anterior pituitary / n/a; More reference expression data
BioGPS	n/a
Gene ontology
Molecular function	DNA-binding transcription factor activity; DNA binding; metal ion binding; nucleic acid binding; DNA-binding transcription factor activity, RNA polymerase II-specific
Cellular component	intracellular anatomical structure; nucleus
Biological process	regulation of transcription, DNA-templated; negative regulation of transcription by RNA polymerase II; transcription, DNA-templated
Sources:Amigo / QuickGO
Orthologs
Databases	NCBI: entry; OMA: entry
Species	Human	Mouse
Entrez	7712	n/a
Ensembl	ENSG00000147117	n/a
UniProt	P51786	n/a
RefSeq (mRNA)	NM_003446	n/a
RefSeq (protein)	NP_003437	n/a
Location (UCSC)	Chr X: 47.37 – 47.41 Mb	n/a
PubMed search		n/a
- Wikidata
View/Edit Human

Zinc finger protein 157 is a protein that in humans is encoded by the ZNF157 gene.

== Function ==
This gene product is a likely zinc finger family transcription factor. It contains KRAB-A and KRAB-B domains that act as transcriptional repressors in related proteins, and multiple zinc finger DNA binding motifs and finger linking regions characteristic of the Kruppel family. This gene is part of a gene cluster on chromosome Xp11.23.
