= USP51 =

Protein-coding gene in the species Homo sapiens

Identifiers
- Aliases: USP51, ubiquitin specific peptidase 51
- External IDs: MGI: 3588217; GeneCards: USP51
Enzyme activity
EC #	BRENDA	ExPASy	KEGG	MetaCyc
3.4.19.12	↗	↗	↗	↗

Gene location (Human)
Chr.	X chromosome (human)
Band	Xp11.21	Start	55,484,616 bp
Band	Xp11.21	End	55,489,848 bp

Gene location (Mouse)
Chr.	X chromosome (mouse)
Band	X|X F3	Start	151,789,465 bp
Band	X|X F3	End	151,792,412 bp
RNA expression pattern
Bgee	Human / Mouse (ortholog); Top expressed in: corpus epididymis; caput epididymis; gonad; bronchial epithelial cell; retinal pigment epithelium; tail of epididymis; testicle; endothelial cell; buccal mucosa cell; mucosa of paranasal sinus / Top expressed in: yolk sac; secondary oocyte; morula; zygote; embryo; primary oocyte; embryo; epiblast; placenta; ventricular zone; More reference expression data
BioGPS	n/a
Gene ontology
Molecular function	thiol-dependent deubiquitinase; zinc ion binding; peptidase activity; cysteine-type peptidase activity; hydrolase activity; metal ion binding; chromatin binding; histone binding
Cellular component	chromosome
Biological process	protein deubiquitination; ubiquitin-dependent protein catabolic process; proteolysis; histone deubiquitination; regulation of response to DNA damage stimulus; regulation of cell cycle process; regulation of double-strand break repair via homologous recombination; regulation of double-strand break repair via nonhomologous end joining; DNA repair; cellular response to DNA damage stimulus
Sources:Amigo / QuickGO
Orthologs
Databases	NCBI: entry; OMA: entry
Species	Human	Mouse
Entrez	158880	635253
Ensembl	ENSG00000247746	ENSMUSG00000067215
UniProt	Q70EK9	B1AY15
RefSeq (mRNA)	NM_201286	NM_001137547
RefSeq (protein)	NP_958443	NP_001131019
Location (UCSC)	Chr X: 55.48 – 55.49 Mb	Chr X: 151.79 – 151.79 Mb
PubMed search
- Wikidata
View/Edit Human	View/Edit Mouse

Ubiquitin carboxyl-terminal hydrolase 51 is an enzyme that in humans is encoded by the USP51 gene.
