= ZNF30 =

Protein-coding gene in the species Homo sapiens

Identifiers
- Aliases: ZNF30, KOX28, zinc finger protein 30
- External IDs: GeneCards: ZNF30

Gene location (Human)
Chr.	Chromosome 19 (human)
Band	19q13.11	Start	34,926,903 bp
Band	19q13.11	End	34,945,170 bp
RNA expression pattern
Bgee	Human / Mouse (ortholog); Top expressed in: gonad; secondary oocyte; pancreatic epithelial cell; Brodmann area 23; middle temporal gyrus; cerebellar cortex; cerebellar hemisphere; right hemisphere of cerebellum; tibia; testicle / n/a; More reference expression data
BioGPS	n/a
Gene ontology
Molecular function	DNA-binding transcription factor activity; DNA binding; metal ion binding; nucleic acid binding; DNA-binding transcription factor activity, RNA polymerase II-specific
Cellular component	intracellular anatomical structure; nucleus
Biological process	regulation of transcription, DNA-templated; transcription, DNA-templated; regulation of transcription by RNA polymerase II
Sources:Amigo / QuickGO
Orthologs
Databases	NCBI: entry; OMA: entry
Species	Human	Mouse
Entrez	90075	n/a
Ensembl	ENSG00000168661	n/a
UniProt	P17039	n/a
RefSeq (mRNA)	NM_001099437; NM_001099438; NM_194325	n/a
RefSeq (protein)	NP_001092907; NP_001092908; NP_919306	n/a
Location (UCSC)	Chr 19: 34.93 – 34.95 Mb	n/a
PubMed search		n/a
- Wikidata
View/Edit Human

Zinc finger protein 30 is a protein that in humans is encoded by the ZNF30 gene.
