= ZNF22 =

Protein-coding gene in the species Homo sapiens

Identifiers
- Aliases: ZNF22, HKR-T1, KOX15, ZNF422, Zfp422, zinc finger protein 22
- External IDs: OMIM: 194529; MGI: 1914505; GeneCards: ZNF22

Gene location (Human)
Chr.	Chromosome 10 (human)
Band	10q11.21	Start	45,000,923 bp
Band	10q11.21	End	45,005,326 bp

Gene location (Mouse)
Chr.	Chromosome 6 (mouse)
Band	6|6 E3	Start	116,600,977 bp
Band	6|6 E3	End	116,605,960 bp
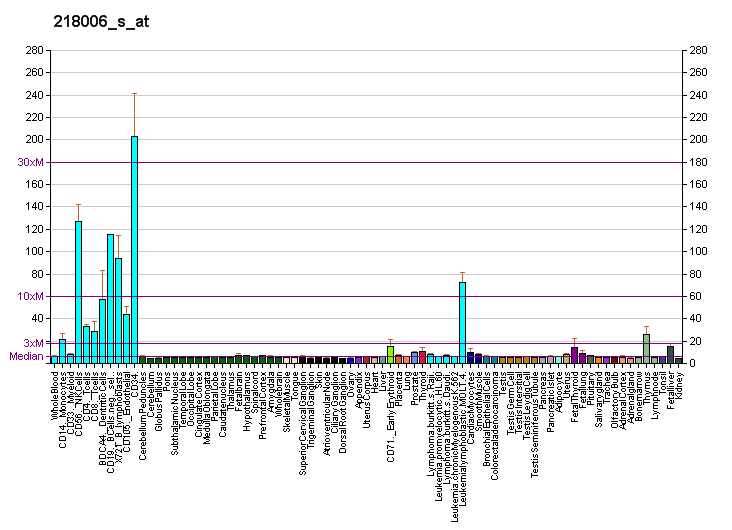

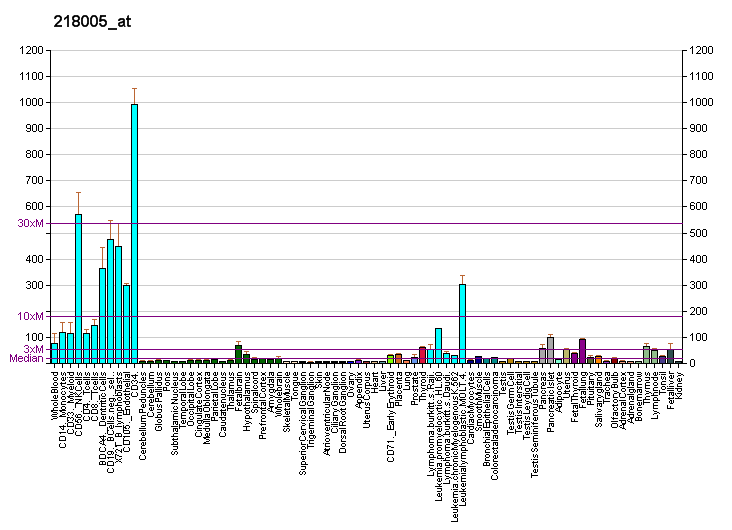
RNA expression pattern
Bgee	Human / Mouse (ortholog); Top expressed in: ventricular zone; ganglionic eminence; secondary oocyte; islet of Langerhans; body of pancreas; endometrium; lymph node; Achilles tendon; trabecular bone; tibia / Top expressed in: ventricular zone; ganglionic eminence; genital tubercle; tail of embryo; neural tube; mesencephalon; thymus; epiblast; serous sac; stomach; More reference expression data
BioGPS	More reference expression data
Gene ontology
Molecular function	zinc ion binding; metal ion binding; DNA binding; nucleic acid binding; DNA-binding transcription factor activity, RNA polymerase II-specific
Cellular component	nucleus; nucleoplasm
Biological process	odontogenesis; regulation of transcription, DNA-templated; transcription, DNA-templated; regulation of transcription by RNA polymerase II
Sources:Amigo / QuickGO
Orthologs
Databases	NCBI: entry; OMA: entry
Species	Human	Mouse
Entrez	7570	67255
Ensembl	ENSG00000165512	ENSMUSG00000059878
UniProt	P17026	Q9ERU3
RefSeq (mRNA)	NM_006963	NM_026057; NM_001302439; NM_001302440
RefSeq (protein)	NP_008894; NP_008894.2	NP_001289368; NP_001289369; NP_080333
Location (UCSC)	Chr 10: 45 – 45.01 Mb	Chr 6: 116.6 – 116.61 Mb
PubMed search
- Wikidata
View/Edit Human	View/Edit Mouse

Zinc finger protein 22 is a protein that in humans is encoded by the ZNF22 gene.
