= ZNF44 =

Protein-coding gene in the species Homo sapiens

Identifiers
- Aliases: ZNF44, GIOT-2, KOX7, ZNF, ZNF504, ZNF55, ZNF58, zinc finger protein 44
- External IDs: OMIM: 194542; GeneCards: ZNF44

Gene location (Human)
Chr.	Chromosome 19 (human)
Band	19p13.2	Start	12,224,686 bp
Band	19p13.2	End	12,294,883 bp
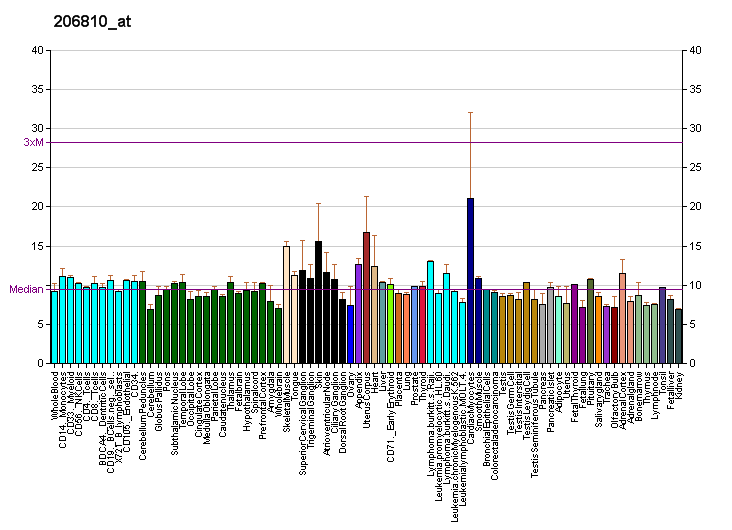
RNA expression pattern
Bgee	Human / Mouse (ortholog); Top expressed in: buccal mucosa cell; renal medulla; pylorus; superficial temporal artery; cardia; mucosa of paranasal sinus; superior surface of tongue; visceral pleura; nipple; caput epididymis / n/a; More reference expression data
BioGPS	More reference expression data
Gene ontology
Molecular function	DNA binding; metal ion binding; nucleic acid binding; DNA-binding transcription factor activity, RNA polymerase II-specific
Cellular component	intracellular anatomical structure; nucleus
Biological process	regulation of transcription, DNA-templated; transcription, DNA-templated; regulation of transcription by RNA polymerase II
Sources:Amigo / QuickGO
Orthologs
Databases	NCBI: entry; OMA: entry
Species	Human	Mouse
Entrez	51710	n/a
Ensembl	ENSG00000197857	n/a
UniProt	P15621	n/a
RefSeq (mRNA)	NM_001164276; NM_016264; NM_001353549; NM_001353550; NM_001353551 NM_001353552; NM_001353553	n/a
RefSeq (protein)	NP_001157748; NP_057348; NP_001340478; NP_001340479; NP_001340480 NP_001340481; NP_001340482	n/a
Location (UCSC)	Chr 19: 12.22 – 12.29 Mb	n/a
PubMed search		n/a
- Wikidata
View/Edit Human

Zinc finger protein 44 is a protein that in humans is encoded by the ZNF44 gene.
