= ZBTB11 =

Protein-coding gene in the species Homo sapiens

Identifiers
- Aliases: ZBTB11, ZNF-U69274, ZNF913, zinc finger and BTB domain containing 11, MRT69
- External IDs: OMIM: 618181; MGI: 2443876; GeneCards: ZBTB11

Gene location (Human)
Chr.	Chromosome 3 (human)
Band	3q12.3	Start	101,648,889 bp
Band	3q12.3	End	101,677,135 bp

Gene location (Mouse)
Chr.	Chromosome 16 (mouse)
Band	16|16 C1.1	Start	55,794,246 bp
Band	16|16 C1.1	End	55,829,276 bp
RNA expression pattern
Bgee	Human / Mouse (ortholog); Top expressed in: sperm; secondary oocyte; endothelial cell; tibia; Epithelium of choroid plexus; visceral pleura; parietal pleura; jejunal mucosa; superficial temporal artery; hair follicle / Top expressed in: dorsomedial hypothalamic nucleus; pineal gland; paraventricular nucleus of hypothalamus; ventral tegmental area; lateral hypothalamus; superior colliculus; Region I of hippocampus proper; ventromedial nucleus; lateral septal nucleus; parotid gland; More reference expression data
BioGPS	n/a
Gene ontology
Molecular function	metal ion binding; DNA binding; nucleic acid binding; molecular function; DNA-binding transcription factor activity, RNA polymerase II-specific
Cellular component	nucleus; nucleoplasm
Biological process	transcription, DNA-templated; regulation of transcription, DNA-templated; biological process; regulation of transcription by RNA polymerase II
Sources:Amigo / QuickGO
Orthologs
Databases	NCBI: entry; OMA: entry
Species	Human	Mouse
Entrez	27107	271377
Ensembl	ENSG00000066422	ENSMUSG00000022601
UniProt	O95625	G5E8B9
RefSeq (mRNA)	NM_014415	NM_173026
RefSeq (protein)	NP_055230	NP_766614
Location (UCSC)	Chr 3: 101.65 – 101.68 Mb	Chr 16: 55.79 – 55.83 Mb
PubMed search
- Wikidata
View/Edit Human	View/Edit Mouse

Zinc finger and BTB domain containing 11 is a protein that in humans is encoded by the ZBTB11 gene.
