= ZNF383 =

Protein-coding gene in the species Homo sapiens

Identifiers
- Aliases: ZNF383, HSD17, zinc finger protein 383, Zfp383
- External IDs: MGI: 1920979; GeneCards: ZNF383

Gene location (Human)
Chr.	Chromosome 19 (human)
Band	19q13.12	Start	37,217,926 bp
Band	19q13.12	End	37,248,738 bp

Gene location (Mouse)
Chr.	Chromosome 7 (mouse)
Band	7|7 B1	Start	29,607,648 bp
Band	7|7 B1	End	29,616,238 bp
RNA expression pattern
Bgee	Human / Mouse (ortholog); Top expressed in: granulocyte; Achilles tendon; epithelium of colon; muscle of thigh; gonad; bone marrow cell; testicle; gastrocnemius muscle; smooth muscle tissue; ganglionic eminence / Top expressed in: hand; primary oocyte; trigeminal ganglion; otolith organ; endocardial cushion; pineal gland; utricle; Gonadal ridge; atrioventricular valve; efferent ductule; More reference expression data
BioGPS	n/a
Gene ontology
Molecular function	DNA-binding transcription factor activity; DNA binding; metal ion binding; nucleic acid binding; DNA-binding transcription factor activity, RNA polymerase II-specific
Cellular component	cytoplasm; nuclear membrane; intracellular anatomical structure; nucleus
Biological process	transcription, DNA-templated; regulation of transcription, DNA-templated; regulation of transcription by RNA polymerase II
Sources:Amigo / QuickGO
Orthologs
Databases	NCBI: entry; OMA: entry
Species	Human	Mouse
Entrez	163087	73729
Ensembl	ENSG00000188283	ENSMUSG00000099689
UniProt	Q8NA42	n/a
RefSeq (mRNA)	NM_152604; NM_001345947; NM_001345948; NM_001345949	NM_001243908
RefSeq (protein)	NP_001332876; NP_001332877; NP_001332878; NP_689817	n/a
Location (UCSC)	Chr 19: 37.22 – 37.25 Mb	Chr 7: 29.61 – 29.62 Mb
PubMed search
- Wikidata
View/Edit Human	View/Edit Mouse

Zinc finger protein 383 is a protein that in humans is encoded by the ZNF383 gene.
