= Zinc finger protein 286a =

Protein found in humans

ZNF286A

Identifiers
- Aliases: ZNF286A, ZNF286, zinc finger protein 286A
- External IDs: MGI: 2384758; GeneCards: ZNF286A

Gene location (Mouse)
Chr.	Chromosome 11 (mouse)
Band	11|11 B2	Start	62,643,403 bp
Band	11|11 B2	End	62,680,288 bp
RNA expression pattern
Bgee	Human / Mouse (ortholog); Top expressed in: ganglionic eminence; sural nerve; smooth muscle tissue; stromal cell of endometrium; gallbladder; cerebellar hemisphere; islet of Langerhans; Achilles tendon; canal of the cervix; Brodmann area 9 / Top expressed in: genital tubercle; spermatocyte; spermatid; ventricular zone; lumbar subsegment of spinal cord; ganglionic eminence; tail of embryo; visual cortex; neural tube; primary visual cortex; More reference expression data
BioGPS	n/a
Gene ontology
Molecular function	DNA-binding transcription factor activity; DNA binding; protein binding; metal ion binding; nucleic acid binding; DNA-binding transcription factor activity, RNA polymerase II-specific
Cellular component	intracellular anatomical structure; nucleus
Biological process	regulation of transcription, DNA-templated; transcription, DNA-templated; regulation of transcription by RNA polymerase II
Sources:Amigo / QuickGO
Orthologs
Databases	NCBI: entry
Species	Human	Mouse
Entrez	57335	192651
Ensembl	n/a	ENSMUSG00000047342
UniProt	Q9HBT8	n/a
RefSeq (mRNA)	NM_020652; NM_001130842; NM_001288642; NM_001288643; NM_001288644 NM_001288645; NM_001288646; NM_001288647; NM_001288648; NM_001288649; NM_001369436; NM_001369437; NM_001369438; NM_001369440	NM_138949; NM_001364096; NM_001364097; NM_001364098; NM_001364100
RefSeq (protein)	NP_001124314; NP_001275571; NP_001275572; NP_001275573; NP_001275574 NP_001275575; NP_001275576; NP_001275577; NP_001275578; NP_065703; NP_001356365; NP_001356366; NP_001356367; NP_001356369	n/a
Location (UCSC)	n/a	Chr 11: 62.64 – 62.68 Mb
PubMed search
- Wikidata
View/Edit Human	View/Edit Mouse

Zinc finger protein 286A is a protein encoded in humans by the ZNF286A gene.
