= ZNF655 =

Protein-coding gene in the species Homo sapiens

Identifiers
- Aliases: ZNF655, VIK, VIK-1, zinc finger protein 655
- External IDs: OMIM: 617891; MGI: 1919861; GeneCards: ZNF655

Gene location (Human)
Chr.	Chromosome 7 (human)
Band	7q22.1	Start	99,558,406 bp
Band	7q22.1	End	99,576,453 bp

Gene location (Mouse)
Chr.	Chromosome 5 (mouse)
Band	5|5 G2	Start	145,168,525 bp
Band	5|5 G2	End	145,184,112 bp
RNA expression pattern
Bgee	Human / Mouse (ortholog); Top expressed in: mucosa of ileum; epithelium of colon; skin of arm; skin of thigh; body of pancreas; gastric mucosa; cardiac muscle tissue of right atrium; thymus; cartilage tissue; muscle layer of sigmoid colon / Top expressed in: secondary oocyte; zygote; primary oocyte; otolith organ; hand; cumulus cell; utricle; medullary collecting duct; substantia nigra; medial ganglionic eminence; More reference expression data
BioGPS	n/a
Gene ontology
Molecular function	DNA-binding transcription factor activity; DNA binding; protein binding; metal ion binding; nucleic acid binding; molecular function; DNA-binding transcription factor activity, RNA polymerase II-specific
Cellular component	cytoplasm; nucleolus; nucleus
Biological process	negative regulation of G1/S transition of mitotic cell cycle; regulation of transcription, DNA-templated; transcription, DNA-templated; regulation of transcription by RNA polymerase II
Sources:Amigo / QuickGO
Orthologs
Databases	NCBI: entry; OMA: entry
Species	Human	Mouse
Entrez	79027	72611
Ensembl	ENSG00000197343	ENSMUSG00000007812
UniProt	Q8N720	n/a
RefSeq (mRNA)	NM_138494; NM_001009956; NM_001009957; NM_001009958; NM_001009960 NM_001083956; NM_001085366; NM_001085367; NM_001085368; NM_024061; NM_001363332; NM_001363333; NM_001363334	NM_001083958; NM_028298; NM_001347533; NM_001363449; NM_001363451 NM_001363452
RefSeq (protein)	NP_001009958; NP_001009960; NP_001077425; NP_001078835; NP_001078836 NP_001078837; NP_076966; NP_612503; NP_001350261; NP_001350262; NP_001350263	n/a
Location (UCSC)	Chr 7: 99.56 – 99.58 Mb	Chr 5: 145.17 – 145.18 Mb
PubMed search
- Wikidata
View/Edit Human	View/Edit Mouse

Zinc finger protein 655 is a protein that in humans is encoded by the ZNF655 gene.

This gene encodes a zinc finger protein. The zinc finger proteins are involved in DNA binding and protein–protein interactions. Multiple alternatively spliced transcript variants encoding distinct isoforms have been found for this gene.
