= ZNF330 =

Protein-coding gene in the species Homo sapiens

Identifiers
- Aliases: ZNF330, HSA6591, NOA36, zinc finger protein 330
- External IDs: OMIM: 609550; MGI: 1353574; GeneCards: ZNF330

Gene location (Human)
Chr.	Chromosome 4 (human)
Band	4q31.21	Start	141,220,887 bp
Band	4q31.21	End	141,234,697 bp

Gene location (Mouse)
Chr.	Chromosome 8 (mouse)
Band	8|8 C2	Start	82,763,607 bp
Band	8|8 C2	End	82,774,160 bp
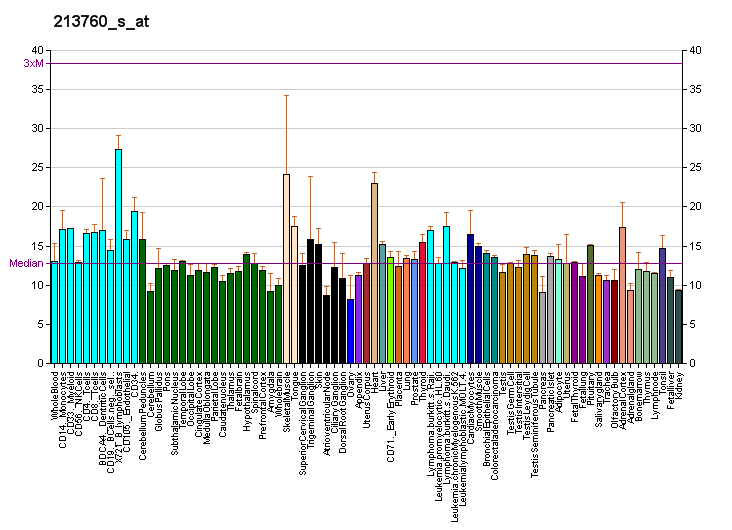

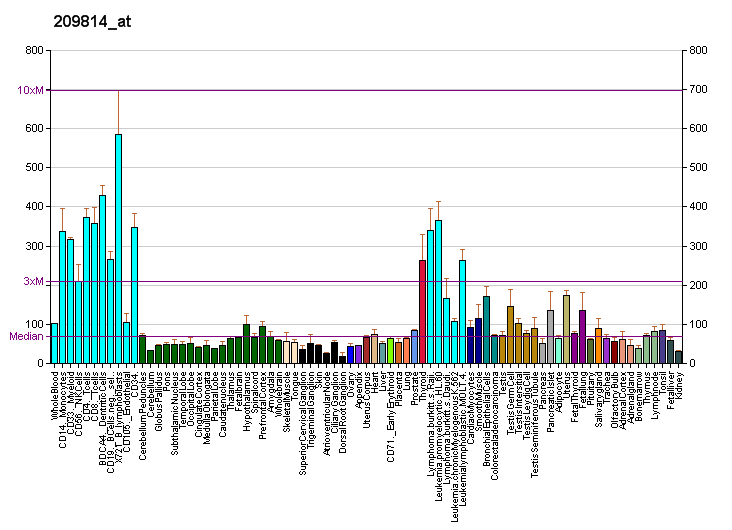
RNA expression pattern
Bgee	Human / Mouse (ortholog); Top expressed in: secondary oocyte; germinal epithelium; sperm; right ventricle; Skeletal muscle tissue of rectus abdominis; left ventricle; amniotic fluid; apex of heart; epithelium of nasopharynx; parotid gland / Top expressed in: epiblast; lens; tail of embryo; genital tubercle; zygote; islet of Langerhans; thymus; neural tube; ovary; neural layer of retina; More reference expression data
BioGPS	More reference expression data
Gene ontology
Molecular function	zinc ion binding; metal ion binding; protein binding
Cellular component	chromosome; nucleus; chromosome, centromeric region; nucleolus; midbody
Biological process	biological process
Sources:Amigo / QuickGO
Orthologs
Databases	NCBI: entry; OMA: entry
Species	Human	Mouse
Entrez	27309	30932
Ensembl	ENSG00000109445	ENSMUSG00000031711
UniProt	Q9Y3S2	Q922H9
RefSeq (mRNA)	NM_001292002; NM_014487	NM_145600
RefSeq (protein)	NP_001278931; NP_055302	NP_663575; NP_001355272; NP_001355273; NP_001355274; NP_001355275
Location (UCSC)	Chr 4: 141.22 – 141.23 Mb	Chr 8: 82.76 – 82.77 Mb
PubMed search
- Wikidata
View/Edit Human	View/Edit Mouse

Zinc finger protein 330 is a protein that in humans is encoded by the ZNF330 gene.
