= ZNF497 =

Protein-coding gene in the species Homo sapiens

Identifiers
- Aliases: ZNF497, zinc finger protein 497
- External IDs: GeneCards: ZNF497

Gene location (Human)
Chr.	Chromosome 19 (human)
Band	19q13.43	Start	58,354,357 bp
Band	19q13.43	End	58,362,848 bp
RNA expression pattern
Bgee	Human / Mouse (ortholog); Top expressed in: right uterine tube; gonad; ventricular zone; right hemisphere of cerebellum; testicle; ganglionic eminence; right lobe of thyroid gland; left lobe of thyroid gland; anterior pituitary; stromal cell of endometrium / n/a; More reference expression data
BioGPS	n/a
Gene ontology
Molecular function	DNA binding; metal ion binding; nucleic acid binding; DNA-binding transcription factor activity, RNA polymerase II-specific; DNA-binding transcription factor activity
Cellular component	nucleus; nucleoplasm
Biological process	regulation of transcription, DNA-templated; transcription, DNA-templated; regulation of transcription by RNA polymerase II; negative regulation of transcription by RNA polymerase II; positive regulation of transcription by RNA polymerase II
Sources:Amigo / QuickGO
Orthologs
Databases	NCBI: entry; OMA: entry
Species	Human	Mouse
Entrez	162968	n/a
Ensembl	ENSG00000174586	n/a
UniProt	Q6ZNH5	n/a
RefSeq (mRNA)	NM_198458; NM_001207009	n/a
RefSeq (protein)	NP_001193938; NP_940860	n/a
Location (UCSC)	Chr 19: 58.35 – 58.36 Mb	n/a
PubMed search		n/a
- Wikidata
View/Edit Human

Zinc finger protein 497 is a protein that in humans is encoded by the ZNF497 gene.
