= ZNF865 =

Human gene

Identifiers
- Aliases: ZNF865, zinc finger protein 865
- External IDs: MGI: 2442656; GeneCards: ZNF865

Gene location (Human)
Chr.	Chromosome 19 (human)
Band	19q13.42	Start	55,605,647 bp
Band	19q13.42	End	55,617,269 bp

Gene location (Mouse)
Chr.	Chromosome 7 (mouse)
Band	7|7 A1	Start	5,023,375 bp
Band	7|7 A1	End	5,039,767 bp
RNA expression pattern
Bgee	Human / Mouse (ortholog); Top expressed in: gastrocnemius muscle; muscle of thigh; apex of heart; granulocyte; right atrium; left ventricle; right auricle of heart; sural nerve; muscle layer of sigmoid colon; popliteal artery / Top expressed in: granulocyte; genital tubercle; tail of embryo; muscle of thigh; neural layer of retina; ventricular zone; superior frontal gyrus; lip; primary visual cortex; yolk sac; More reference expression data
BioGPS	n/a
Gene ontology
Molecular function	DNA binding; metal ion binding; nucleic acid binding
Cellular component	nucleus
Biological process	regulation of transcription, DNA-templated; transcription, DNA-templated
Sources:Amigo / QuickGO
Orthologs
Databases	NCBI: entry; OMA: entry
Species	Human	Mouse
Entrez	100507290	319748
Ensembl	ENSG00000261221	ENSMUSG00000074405
UniProt	P0CJ78	Q3U3I9
RefSeq (mRNA)	NM_001195605	NM_001033383; NM_001290426
RefSeq (protein)	NP_001182534	NP_001028555; NP_001277355
Location (UCSC)	Chr 19: 55.61 – 55.62 Mb	Chr 7: 5.02 – 5.04 Mb
PubMed search
- Wikidata
View/Edit Human	View/Edit Mouse

Zinc finger protein 865 is a protein that in humans is encoded by the ZNF865 gene. (also referred to as BLST [2-4])

ZNF865 is a C2H2 member of the zinc finger family of proteins.

== Structure ==
Structurally, ZNF865 consists of 20 different zinc finger domains, 6 disordered regions, 2 transactivation domains, and 2 TGEKP domains.

== Function ==
Broadly, ZNF865 is expressed across all human cell and tissue types. Bioinformatics analysis predicts ZNF865 to be localized to the nucleus, and function in metal ion binding, DNA-binding transcription factor activity, interact with RNA polymerase II, and regulate transcription by RNA polymerase II. Experimental data displays ZNF865 is a regulator of cellular senescence, cell cycle progression, DNA replication, DNA repair, and protein processing. Lack of expression of ZNF865 induces cellular senescence, indicating that ZNF865 expression is necessary for healthy cell function. While increased expression of ZNF865 results in a shift in the cell cycle, increased rates of DNA replication and proliferation rates. Overall, ZNF865 has been confirmed as a regulator of cellular senescence, cell cycle progression, and DNA replication.

== Clinical significance ==
Diseases associated with ZNF865 expression include Parkinson’s disease, esophageal cancer, and musculoskeletal diseases. Lack of expression of ZNF865 has been associated with increased incidence of Parkinson’s disease, worse outcome measures in esophageal cancer, and increased incidence of musculoskeletal diseases.
