= COBW domain containing 3 =

Protein-coding gene in the species Homo sapiens

ZNG1C

Identifiers
- Aliases: ZNG1C, bA561O23.1, COBW domain containing 3, CBWD3, Zn Regulated GTPase Metalloprotein Activator 1C
- External IDs: OMIM: 611080; GeneCards: ZNG1C

Gene location (Human)
Chr.	Chromosome 9 (human)
Band	9q21.11	Start	68,232,003 bp
Band	9q21.11	End	68,300,035 bp
RNA expression pattern
Bgee	Human / Mouse (ortholog); Top expressed in: Achilles tendon; monocyte; islet of Langerhans; testicle; sural nerve; appendix; right hemisphere of cerebellum; tonsil; anterior pituitary; liver / n/a; More reference expression data
BioGPS	n/a
Orthologs
Databases	NCBI: entry; OMA: entry
Species	Human	Mouse
Entrez	445571	n/a
Ensembl	ENSG00000196873	n/a
UniProt	Q5JTY5	n/a
RefSeq (mRNA)	NM_001291821; NM_201453; NM_001378113; NM_001378114; NM_001378115 NM_001378116; NM_001378117	n/a
RefSeq (protein)	NP_001278750; NP_958861; NP_001365042; NP_001365043; NP_001365044 NP_001365045; NP_001365046	n/a
Location (UCSC)	Chr 9: 68.23 – 68.3 Mb	n/a
PubMed search		n/a
- Wikidata
View/Edit Human

COBW domain containing 3 is a protein that in humans is encoded by the gene ZNG1C (previously CBWD3).
