= Zinc finger protein 439 =

Protein found in humans

ZNF439

Identifiers
- Aliases: ZNF439
- External IDs: GeneCards: ZNF439
Gene ontology
Molecular function	DNA binding; protein binding; metal ion binding; nucleic acid binding; DNA-binding transcription factor activity, RNA polymerase II-specific
Cellular component	intracellular anatomical structure; nucleus
Biological process	regulation of transcription, DNA-templated; transcription, DNA-templated; regulation of transcription by RNA polymerase II
Sources:Amigo / QuickGO
Orthologs
Databases	NCBI: entry; OMA: entry
Species	Human	Mouse
Entrez	90594	n/a
Ensembl	ENSG00000171291	n/a
UniProt	Q8NDP4	n/a
RefSeq (mRNA)	NM_152262	n/a
RefSeq (protein)	NP_689475; NP_001335647; NP_001335648; NP_001335649; NP_001335650 NP_001335651; NP_001335652; NP_001335653; NP_001335654	n/a
Location (UCSC)	n/a	n/a
PubMed search		n/a
- Wikidata
View/Edit Human

Zinc finger protein 439 is a protein that in humans is encoded by the ZNF439 gene.
