= ZNF34 =

Protein-coding gene in the species Homo sapiens

Identifiers
- Aliases: ZNF34, KOX32, zinc finger protein 34
- External IDs: OMIM: 194526; GeneCards: ZNF34

Gene location (Human)
Chr.	Chromosome 8 (human)
Band	8q24.3	Start	144,772,224 bp
Band	8q24.3	End	144,787,345 bp
RNA expression pattern
Bgee	Human / Mouse (ortholog); Top expressed in: tibial arteries; cerebellar hemisphere; right hemisphere of cerebellum; testicle; ganglionic eminence; gastric mucosa; tibial nerve; Descending thoracic aorta; canal of the cervix; muscle layer of sigmoid colon / n/a; More reference expression data
BioGPS	n/a
Gene ontology
Molecular function	DNA binding; protein binding; metal ion binding; nucleic acid binding; DNA-binding transcription factor activity, RNA polymerase II-specific
Cellular component	intracellular anatomical structure; nucleus; nucleoplasm; cytosol
Biological process	regulation of transcription, DNA-templated; transcription, DNA-templated; regulation of transcription by RNA polymerase II
Sources:Amigo / QuickGO
Orthologs
Databases	NCBI: entry; OMA: entry
Species	Human	Mouse
Entrez	80778	n/a
Ensembl	ENSG00000196378	n/a
UniProt	Q8IZ26	n/a
RefSeq (mRNA)	NM_001286769; NM_001286770; NM_030580; NM_001378027; NM_001378028 NM_001378029	n/a
RefSeq (protein)	NP_001273698; NP_001273699; NP_085057; NP_001364956; NP_001364957 NP_001364958	n/a
Location (UCSC)	Chr 8: 144.77 – 144.79 Mb	n/a
PubMed search		n/a
- Wikidata
View/Edit Human

Zinc finger protein 34 is a protein that in humans is encoded by the ZNF34 gene.
