= Syndetin =

Protein-coding gene in the species Homo sapiens

VPS50

Identifiers
- Aliases: VPS50, CCDC132, VPS54L, FLJ20097 / CCDC132, EARP/GARPII complex subunit, VPS50 subunit of EARP/GARPII complex, NEDMSC
- External IDs: OMIM: 616465; MGI: 1920538; GeneCards: VPS50

Gene location (Human)
Chr.	Chromosome 7 (human)
Band	7q21.2-q21.3	Start	93,232,340 bp
Band	7q21.2-q21.3	End	93,361,123 bp

Gene location (Mouse)
Chr.	Chromosome 6 (mouse)
Band	6|6 A1	Start	3,498,382 bp
Band	6|6 A1	End	3,603,531 bp
RNA expression pattern
Bgee	Human / Mouse (ortholog); Top expressed in: Achilles tendon; endothelial cell; tibialis anterior muscle; Brodmann area 46; middle temporal gyrus; Brodmann area 23; secondary oocyte; superior frontal gyrus; postcentral gyrus; sperm / Top expressed in: genital tubercle; superior cervical ganglion; spermatid; zygote; tail of embryo; secondary oocyte; dentate gyrus of hippocampal formation granule cell; primary motor cortex; visual cortex; habenula; More reference expression data
BioGPS	n/a
Gene ontology
Molecular function	SNARE binding; protein binding
Cellular component	recycling endosome; EARP complex; endosome; extracellular exosome; membrane; cytosol
Biological process	protein transport; retrograde transport, endosome to Golgi; endocytic recycling; transport
Sources:Amigo / QuickGO
Orthologs
Databases	NCBI: entry; OMA: entry
Species	Human	Mouse
Entrez	55610	73288
Ensembl	ENSG00000004766	ENSMUSG00000001376
UniProt	Q96JG6	Q8CI71
RefSeq (mRNA)	NM_001257998; NM_017667; NM_024553	NM_001167750; NM_001167751; NM_024260
RefSeq (protein)	NP_001244927; NP_060137; NP_078829	NP_001161222; NP_001161223; NP_077222
Location (UCSC)	Chr 7: 93.23 – 93.36 Mb	Chr 6: 3.5 – 3.6 Mb
PubMed search
- Wikidata
View/Edit Human	View/Edit Mouse

Syndetin is a protein that in humans is encoded by the VPS50 gene. It is a component of the EARP complex that is involved in endocytic recycling.
