= ZNF644 =

Protein found in humans

Identifiers
- Aliases: ZNF644, BM-005, MYP21, NatF, ZEP-2, zinc finger protein 644
- External IDs: OMIM: 614159; MGI: 1277212; GeneCards: ZNF644

Gene location (Human)
Chr.	Chromosome 1 (human)
Band	1p22.2	Start	90,915,298 bp
Band	1p22.2	End	91,022,272 bp

Gene location (Mouse)
Chr.	Chromosome 5 (mouse)
Band	5 E5|5 51.43 cM	Start	106,616,739 bp
Band	5 E5|5 51.43 cM	End	106,697,287 bp
RNA expression pattern
Bgee	Human / Mouse (ortholog); Top expressed in: Achilles tendon; ventricular zone; ganglionic eminence; tibialis anterior muscle; mucosa of ileum; testicle; epithelium of colon; gonad; corpus callosum; bone marrow cell / Top expressed in: genital tubercle; tail of embryo; Gonadal ridge; spermatocyte; spermatid; medial ganglionic eminence; extensor digitorum longus muscle; cardiac muscle tissue of left ventricle; maxillary prominence; lobe of cerebellum; More reference expression data
BioGPS	n/a
Gene ontology
Molecular function	DNA binding; metal ion binding; nucleic acid binding; DNA-binding transcription factor activity, RNA polymerase II-specific; DNA-binding transcription factor activity
Cellular component	nucleus
Biological process	regulation of transcription, DNA-templated; transcription, DNA-templated; regulation of transcription by RNA polymerase II
Sources:Amigo / QuickGO
Orthologs
Databases	NCBI: entry; OMA: entry
Species	Human	Mouse
Entrez	84146	52397
Ensembl	ENSG00000122482	ENSMUSG00000049606
UniProt	Q9H582	n/a
RefSeq (mRNA)	NM_016620; NM_032186; NM_201269	NM_026856; NM_001363318; NM_001363319; NM_001363320; NM_001363321 NM_001363322; NM_001363323
RefSeq (protein)	NP_057704; NP_115562; NP_958357	n/a
Location (UCSC)	Chr 1: 90.92 – 91.02 Mb	Chr 5: 106.62 – 106.7 Mb
PubMed search
- Wikidata
View/Edit Human	View/Edit Mouse

Zing finger protein 644 (ZNF644) also known as zinc finger motif enhancer-binding protein 2 (Zep-2) is a protein that in humans is encoded by the ZNF644 gene.

== Clinical relevance ==
Mutations in the ZNF644 gene have been found in sporadic cases of high myopia.
