= ZNF202 =

Protein-coding gene in the species Homo sapiens

Identifiers
- Aliases: ZNF202, ZKSCAN10, ZSCAN42, zinc finger protein 202
- External IDs: OMIM: 603430; MGI: 1933401; GeneCards: ZNF202

Gene location (Human)
Chr.	Chromosome 11 (human)
Band	11q24.1	Start	123,723,914 bp
Band	11q24.1	End	123,741,675 bp

Gene location (Mouse)
Chr.	Chromosome 9 (mouse)
Band	9|9 A5.1	Start	40,103,612 bp
Band	9|9 A5.1	End	40,124,900 bp
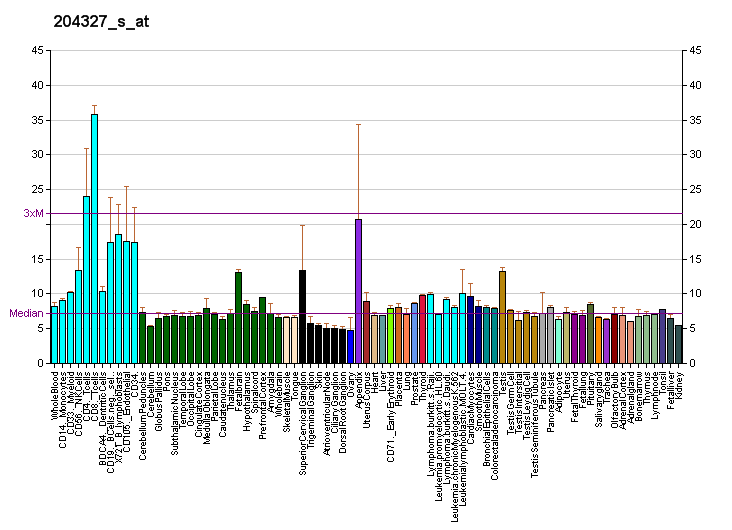

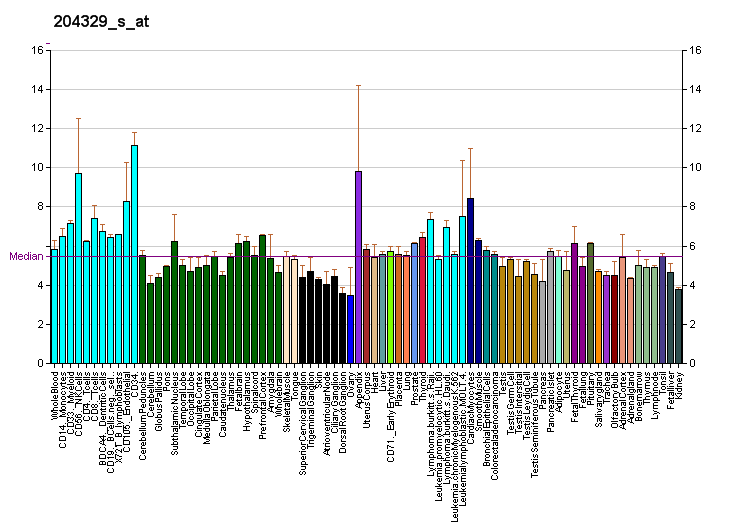
RNA expression pattern
Bgee	Human / Mouse (ortholog); Top expressed in: secondary oocyte; body of pancreas; granulocyte; gonad; right ovary; ventricular zone; left ovary; left uterine tube; body of uterus; rectum / Top expressed in: spermatocyte; urethra; female urethra; male urethra; tail of embryo; genital tubercle; ventricular zone; trigeminal ganglion; yolk sac; spermatid; More reference expression data
BioGPS	More reference expression data
Gene ontology
Molecular function	protein binding; nucleic acid binding; DNA-binding transcription factor activity; metal ion binding; DNA binding; RNA polymerase II cis-regulatory region sequence-specific DNA binding; DNA-binding transcription repressor activity, RNA polymerase II-specific; DNA-binding transcription factor activity, RNA polymerase II-specific
Cellular component	nucleus; intracellular anatomical structure
Biological process	lipid metabolism; transcription by RNA polymerase II; regulation of transcription, DNA-templated; transcription, DNA-templated; negative regulation of transcription by RNA polymerase II
Sources:Amigo / QuickGO
Orthologs
Databases	NCBI: entry; OMA: entry
Species	Human	Mouse
Entrez	7753	80902
Ensembl	ENSG00000166261	ENSMUSG00000025602
UniProt	O95125	n/a
RefSeq (mRNA)	NM_001301779; NM_001301780; NM_001301819; NM_003455	NM_030713; NM_001359464
RefSeq (protein)	NP_001288708; NP_001288709; NP_001288748; NP_003446	n/a
Location (UCSC)	Chr 11: 123.72 – 123.74 Mb	Chr 9: 40.1 – 40.12 Mb
PubMed search
- Wikidata
View/Edit Human	View/Edit Mouse

Zinc finger protein 202 is a transcription factor first associated with breast cancer. It is a protein that, in humans, is encoded by the ZNF202 gene.

== Clinical significance ==
Variants of this protein have been discovered to be strongly associated with coronary heart disease and atherosclerosis.
