= ZNF471 =

Protein-coding gene in the species Homo sapiens

Identifiers
- Aliases: ZNF471, ERP1, Z1971, zinc finger protein 471, Zfp78
- External IDs: MGI: 107783; GeneCards: ZNF471

Gene location (Human)
| Chr. | Chromosome 19 (human) |
| Band | 19q13.43 | Start | 56,507,850 bp |
| Band | 19q13.43 | End | 56,530,221 bp |

Gene location (Mouse)
| Chr. | Chromosome 7 (mouse) |
| Band | 7 A1|7 3.69 cM | Start | 6,366,279 bp |
| Band | 7 A1|7 3.69 cM | End | 6,385,604 bp |
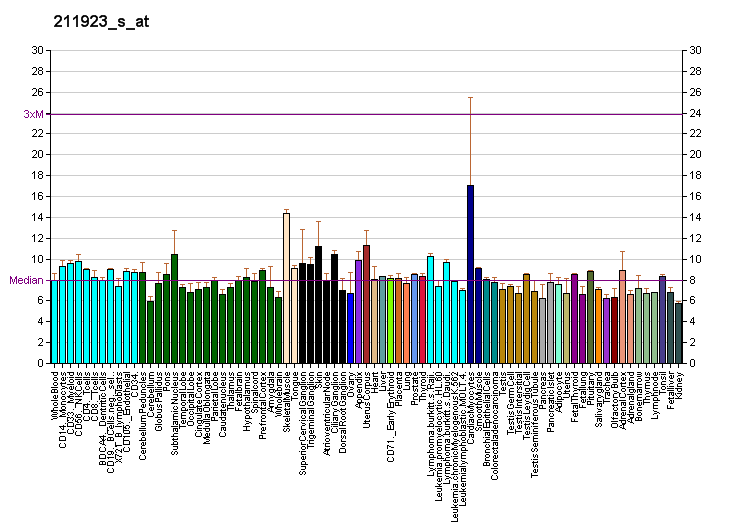
RNA expression pattern
| Bgee | Human / Mouse (ortholog); Top expressed in: right uterine tube; left ovary; right ovary; body of uterus; right hemisphere of cerebellum; tibial nerve; Achilles tendon; canal of the cervix; muscle layer of sigmoid colon; right lobe of thyroid gland / Top expressed in: zygote; secondary oocyte; primary oocyte; neural layer of retina; lumbar spinal ganglion; morula; olfactory epithelium; embryo; genital tubercle; embryo; More reference expression data |
| BioGPS | More reference expression data |
Gene ontology
| Molecular function | DNA binding; DNA-binding transcription factor activity; metal ion binding; nucleic acid binding; DNA-binding transcription factor activity, RNA polymerase II-specific |
| Cellular component | intracellular anatomical structure; nucleus |
| Biological process | transcription, DNA-templated; regulation of transcription, DNA-templated; regulation of transcription by RNA polymerase II |
Sources:Amigo / QuickGO
Orthologs
| Databases | NCBI: entry; OMA: entry |
| Species | Human | Mouse |
| Entrez | 57573 | 330463 |
| Ensembl | ENSG00000196263 | ENSMUSG00000055150 |
| UniProt | Q9BX82 | n/a |
| RefSeq (mRNA) | NM_020813; NM_001321768 | NM_001025163; NM_001112805; NM_177888 |
| RefSeq (protein) | NP_001308697; NP_065864 | n/a |
| Location (UCSC) | Chr 19: 56.51 – 56.53 Mb | Chr 7: 6.37 – 6.39 Mb |
| PubMed search |
- Wikidata
| View/Edit Human | View/Edit Mouse |

Zinc finger protein 471 is a protein that in humans is encoded by the ZNF471 gene.
