= ZNF182 =

Protein-coding gene in the species Homo sapiens

Identifiers
- Aliases: ZNF182, HHZ150, KOX14, ZNF21, Zfp182, zinc finger protein 182
- External IDs: OMIM: 314993; MGI: 2442220; GeneCards: ZNF182

Gene location (Human)
| Chr. | X chromosome (human) |
| Band | Xp11.23 | Start | 47,974,851 bp |
| Band | Xp11.23 | End | 48,003,989 bp |

Gene location (Mouse)
| Chr. | X chromosome (mouse) |
| Band | X|X A1.3 | Start | 21,028,939 bp |
| Band | X|X A1.3 | End | 21,062,316 bp |
RNA expression pattern
| Bgee | Human / Mouse (ortholog); Top expressed in: secondary oocyte; vena cava; cerebellar vermis; thymus; nasal epithelium; Skeletal muscle tissue of rectus abdominis; trabecular bone; pylorus; middle temporal gyrus; pericardium / Top expressed in: zygote; primary oocyte; secondary oocyte; granulocyte; genital tubercle; tail of embryo; thymus; ventricular zone; embryo; ganglionic eminence; More reference expression data |
| BioGPS | n/a |
Gene ontology
| Molecular function | DNA-binding transcription factor activity; DNA binding; metal ion binding; nucleic acid binding; DNA-binding transcription factor activity, RNA polymerase II-specific |
| Cellular component | intracellular anatomical structure; nucleus |
| Biological process | regulation of transcription, DNA-templated; transcription, DNA-templated; regulation of transcription by RNA polymerase II |
Sources:Amigo / QuickGO
Orthologs
| Databases | NCBI: entry; OMA: entry |
| Species | Human | Mouse |
| Entrez | 7569 | 319535 |
| Ensembl | ENSG00000147118 | ENSMUSG00000054737 |
| UniProt | P17025 | Q6P560 |
| RefSeq (mRNA) | NM_006962; NM_001007088; NM_001178099 | NM_001013387; NM_001111076 |
| RefSeq (protein) | NP_001007089; NP_001171570; NP_008893 | NP_001013405; NP_001104546 |
| Location (UCSC) | Chr X: 47.97 – 48 Mb | Chr X: 21.03 – 21.06 Mb |
| PubMed search |
- Wikidata
| View/Edit Human | View/Edit Mouse |

Zinc finger protein 182 is a protein that in humans is encoded by the ZNF182 gene.
