= ZBTB40 =

Protein-coding gene in humans

Identifiers
- Aliases: ZBTB40, ZNF923, zinc finger and BTB domain containing 40
- External IDs: OMIM: 612106; MGI: 2682254; GeneCards: ZBTB40

Gene location (Human)
Chr.	Chromosome 1 (human)
Band	1p36.12	Start	22,428,838 bp
Band	1p36.12	End	22,531,157 bp

Gene location (Mouse)
Chr.	Chromosome 4 (mouse)
Band	4|4 D3	Start	136,707,043 bp
Band	4|4 D3	End	136,776,112 bp
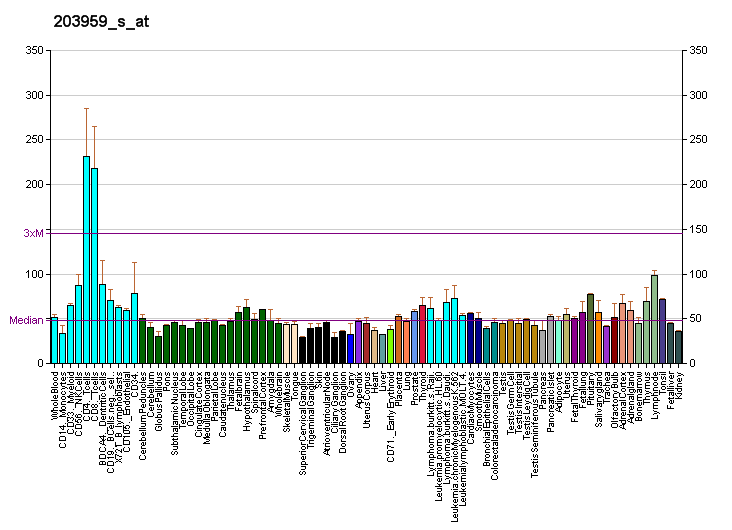

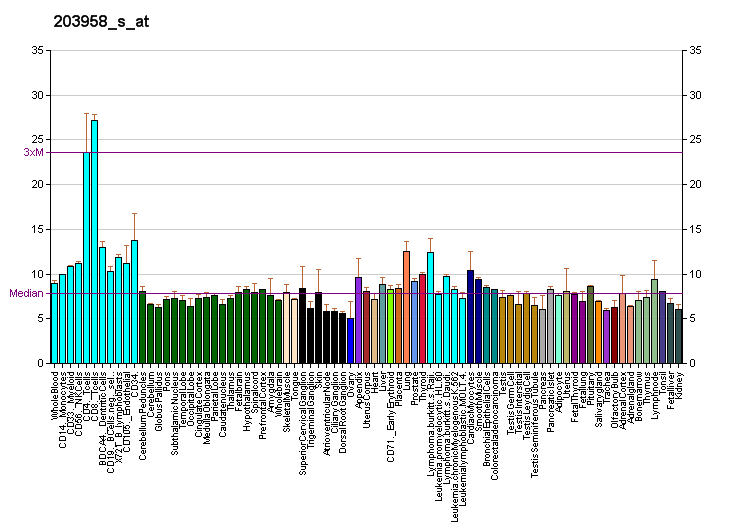
RNA expression pattern
Bgee	Human / Mouse (ortholog); Top expressed in: dorsal motor nucleus of vagus nerve; tibia; right coronary artery; granulocyte; sperm; endothelial cell; sural nerve; inferior olivary nucleus; cardia; right adrenal cortex / Top expressed in: otic vesicle; otolith organ; utricle; ascending aorta; aortic valve; urethra; female urethra; spermatocyte; Paneth cell; male urethra; More reference expression data
BioGPS	More reference expression data
Gene ontology
Molecular function	DNA binding; metal ion binding; nucleic acid binding; molecular function; DNA-binding transcription factor activity, RNA polymerase II-specific
Cellular component	nucleus; extracellular region
Biological process	bone mineralization; regulation of transcription, DNA-templated; transcription, DNA-templated; cellular response to DNA damage stimulus; regulation of transcription by RNA polymerase II; negative regulation of endopeptidase activity
Sources:Amigo / QuickGO
Orthologs
Databases	NCBI: entry; OMA: entry
Species	Human	Mouse
Entrez	9923	230848
Ensembl	ENSG00000184677	ENSMUSG00000060862
UniProt	Q9NUA8; Q1RMZ5	Q6PCS8
RefSeq (mRNA)	NM_001083621; NM_014870; NM_001330398	NM_198248
RefSeq (protein)	NP_001077090; NP_001317327; NP_055685; NP_001077090.1; NP_055685.3	NP_937891
Location (UCSC)	Chr 1: 22.43 – 22.53 Mb	Chr 4: 136.71 – 136.78 Mb
PubMed search
- Wikidata
View/Edit Human	View/Edit Mouse

Zinc finger and BTB domain-containing protein 40 is a protein that in humans is encoded by the ZBTB40 gene.
