= Index of molecular biology articles =

This is a list of topics in molecular biology. See also index of biochemistry articles.

== # ==
2-amino-4-deoxychorismate dehydrogenase - 2-dehydropantolactone reductase (B-specific) - 2-methylacyl-CoA dehydrogenase - 2-nitropropane dioxygenase - 2-oxobutyrate synthase - (2,3-dihydroxybenzoyl)adenylate synthase - 2,4-Dihydroxy-1,4-benzoxazin-3-one-glucoside dioxygenase - 2010107G12Rik - 27-hydroxycholesterol 7alpha-monooxygenase - 3' end - 3' flanking region - 3-hydroxy-2-methylpyridinecarboxylate dioxygenase - 3-Ketosteroid 9alpha-monooxygenase - 3-oxoacyl-(acyl-carrier-protein) reductase (NADH) - (3,5-dihydroxyphenyl)acetyl-CoA 1,2-dioxygenase - 3(or 17)a-hydroxysteroid dehydrogenase - 3110001I22Rik - 3alpha-hydroxyglycyrrhetinate dehydrogenase - 4932414N04Rik - 3alpha-hydroxysteroid dehydrogenase (A-specific) - 3alpha,7alpha,12alpha-trihydroxy-5beta-cholestanoyl-CoA 24-hydroxylase - 3alpha,7alpha,12alpha-trihydroxycholestan-26-al 26-oxidoreductase - 4-Cresol dehydrogenase (hydroxylating) - 4-Hydroxycyclohexanecarboxylate dehydrogenase - 4-hydroxyphenylacetaldehyde oxime monooxygenase - 4-hydroxyphenylpyruvate oxidase - 4-Nitrophenol 4-monooxygenase - 4933425L06Rik - 5' end - 5' flanking region - 5-pyridoxate dioxygenase - 6-endo-hydroxycineole dehydrogenase - 7-deoxyloganin 7-hydroxylase - 7beta-hydroxysteroid dehydrogenase (NADP+) - 8-oxocoformycin reductase - 12beta-hydroxysteroid dehydrogenase - 25-hydroxycholesterol 7α-hydroxylase -

== A ==
abietadiene hydroxylase - acido-1 RNA motif -acrylamide gels - act 1 adaptor protein - actino-ugpB RNA motif - actinomyces-1 RNA motif - adenine - adenosine deaminase deficiency - adenovirus - adenylyl-(glutamate—ammonia ligase) hydrolase - agarose gel electrophoresis - agarose gel - akaryocyte - Alagille syndrome - alkaline lysis - allele - amino acids - amino terminus - amp resistance - amplification - amplicon - anchor sequence - animal model - anneal - anti-sense strand - antibiotic resistance - antibody - antisense - antisense strand - AP-1 site - apo-beta-carotenoid-14',13'-dioxygenase - apoptosis - apovitellenin-1 - archease - arenicin - ArgJ protein family - ascorbate 2,3-dioxygenase - assembled epitope - ataxia-telangiectasia - ATG or AUG - ATP cone - Atrial septal defect 1 - autoimmune lymphoproliferative syndrome - autoradiography - autosomal dominant - autosome - avidin -

== B ==
B3/B4 tRNA-binding domain - B5 protein domain - BAC - back mutation - bacteria - bacterial artificial chromosome - bacteriophage - bacteriophage lambda - bacteriophage scaffolding proteins - band shift assay - base - base pair - benzoyl-CoA 2,3-dioxygenase - benzyl benzoate/disulfiram - benzyl-2-methyl-hydroxybutyrate dehydrogenase - beta-carotene 3-hydroxylase - beta-cyclopiazonate dehydrogenase - beta-glucan-transporting ATPase - beta2-adaptin C-terminal domain - binding site - biological organisation - biological process - Biomolecular gradient - Biomolecule Stretching Database - biotin - birth defect - blotting - blunt end - bone marrow transplantation - box - BP - BRCA1 - BRCA2 - Brix (database) - BSD domain - BURP domain -

== C ==
C terminus - Can f 1 - cancer - candidate gene - Canonical sequence - cap - cap site - carbon-monoxide dehydrogenase (cytochrome b-561) - carboxyl terminus - carcinoma - carnitine dehydratase - carrier - carveol dehydrogenase - Catalog of MCA Control Patterns - CAT assay - CAT RNA-binding domain - catalase-related immune-responsive domain - CCAAT box - Cd2+-exporting ATPase - cDNA - cDNA clone - cDNA library - CDP-acylglycerol O-arachidonoyltransferase - cell - centimorgan - centromere - chain terminator - channel-conductance-controlling ATPase - chaperone protein - chlordecone reductase - chloroplast protein-transporting ATPase - cholestanetriol 26-monooxygenase - cholesterol 7alpha-monooxygenase - chromosome - chromosomal translocation - chromosome walking - CIROP gene - CIS - cistron - clone (genetics) - clone (noun) - clone (verb) - cloning - CmERG1 - coding sequence - coding strand - codon - codon usage bias - competent - complementary - conformational epitope - congenital - consensus sequence - conservative substitution - conserved - contig - coproporphyrinogen dehydrogenase - cortisone alpha-reductase - cosmid - costunolide synthase - CpG - craniosynostosis - crp domain - Cu2+-exporting ATPase - cyclodeaminase domain - cyclohexanol dehydrogenase - cyclopeptine synthase - cystic fibrosis - cytogenetic map - cytosine -

== D ==
D-arabinitol 2-dehydrogenase - D-arabinose 1-dehydrogenase (NAD(P)+) - database search - degeneracy (biology) - deletion - denaturation - denaturing gel - deoxyribonuclease (DNase) - deoxyribonucleic acid - deoxyribonucleotide - deoxyuridine phosphorylase - diabetes mellitus - dideoxy sequencing - dideoxyribonucleotide - diethyl 2-methyl-3-oxosuccinate reductase - dihydrochelirubine 12-monooxygenase - dimethyl sulfide:cytochrome c2 reductase - diploid - direct repeat - directionality - DLG2-AS1 - DNA ligase -DNA Bank - DNA polymerase - DNA replication - DNA sequencing - DNase - dominant - dot blot - double helix - downstream (DNA) - downstream (transduction) - drimenol cyclase- ds - duplex -

== E ==
E. coli - Ecotin - EIF-W2 protein domain - electrophoresis - electroporation - ELFV dehydrogenase - Ellis–van Creveld syndrome - end labeling - endonuclease - enhancer - enterobacter ribonuclease - enzyme - epitope - ethidium bromide - evolutionary clock - evolutionary footprinting - exon - exonuclease - exosome complex - expression - expression clone - expression vector - extended ELM2 domain -

== F ==
familial Mediterranean fever - farnesol dehydrogenase - Fat storage-inducing transmembrane protein 2 - FDC-SP - FHIPEP protein family - fibroblasts - fluorescence in situ hybridization -fluorophore-assisted carbohydrate electrophoresis - footprinting - formylmethanofuran dehydrogenase - Fragile site, folic acid type, rare, fra(2)(q13) - Fragile X syndrome - frameshift mutation - fructose 5-dehydrogenase - fucoidanase - fungal fruit body lectin family - fusion protein -

== G ==
galactosyl-N-acetylglucosaminylgalactosylglucosyl-ceramide b-1,6-N-acetylglucosaminyltransferase - galactosylgalactosylglucosylceramidase - GalP (protein) - GATA zinc finger - gel electrophoresis - gel shift - gel shift assay - gene - gene amplification - gene conversion - gene expression - gene mapping - gene pool - gene therapy - gene transfer - genetic code - genetic counseling - genetic map - genetic marker - genetic screening - genetically modified mouse - genome - genomic blot - genomic clone - genomic library - genotype - geranylgeraniol 18-hydroxylase - germ line - germacrene A alcohol dehydrogenase - gluconate 2-dehydrogenase - glutamate permease - glycerol-3-phosphate-transporting ATPase - glycoprotein - glycosylation - Golgi apparatus - GRE - guanine - guanine-transporting ATPase -

== H ==
haemagglutination activity domain - haemolysin expression modulating protein family - hairpin - haploid - haploinsufficiency - HdeA family - helix-loop-helix - helminth protein - hematopoietic stem cell - hemophilia - heteroduplex DNA - heterozygous - highly conserved sequence - Hirschsprung's disease - histone - HLA-Y - hnRNA - holoprosencephaly - homologous recombination - homology - homozygous - host strain (bacterial) - HspQ protein domain - human artificial chromosome - Human Genome Project - human immunodeficiency virus - HumHot - Huntington's disease - hybridization - hybridoma - hydrophilicity plot - hydroxydechloroatrazine ethylaminohydrolase -

== I ==
immunoblot - immunoprecipitation - immunotherapy - IMPDH/GMPR family - in situ hybridization - in vitro translation - indoleacetaldoxime dehydratase - inducer - infologs - inherited - initiation codon - insert - insertion - insertion sequence - intellectual property rights - intergenic - interleukin 40 - intron - inverted repeat - IscR stability element - isopiperitenol dehydrogenase -

== J ==
juglone 3-monooxygenase - junk DNA -

== K ==
k+-transporting ATPase - karyotype - KduI/IolB isomerase family - kilobase - kinase - Klenow fragment - Knock-down - knock-out - knock-out experiment - knockout - Kozak sequence

== L ==
L-amino-acid alpha-ligase - L-ornithine N5 monooxygenase - lambda - Lamprin - Laser capture microdissection - latarcin - leucine zipper - leukemia - leukotriene-B4 20-monooxygenase - library - licodione synthase - ligase - linear epitope - linkage - linker protein - linoleate diol synthase - lipofectin - lipopolysaccharide kinase (Kdo/WaaP) family - lipopolysaccharide-transporting ATPase - lithocholate 6beta-hydroxylase - locus - LOC100507195 - LOD score - Long intergenic non-protein coding rna 1157 - lymphocyte - lysine—tRNA(Pyl) ligase -

== M ==
M13 phage - m7G(5')pppN diphosphatase - malformation - maltose-transporting ATPase - manganese-transporting ATPase - mannose-6-phosphate 6-reductase - mapping - marker - melanoma - melting - menaquinol oxidase (H+-transporting) - Johann Mendel - Mendelian inheritance - message - messenger RNA - metaphase - methylphenyltetrahydropyridine N-monooxygenase - methylsterol monooxygenase - methyltetrahydroprotoberberine 14-monooxygenase - microarray technology - microsatellite - MIMT1 - minusheet perfusion culture system - Mir-188 microRNA precursor family - Mir-615 microRNA precursor family - Mir-675 microRNA precursor family - missense mutation - mitochondrial DNA - mobility shift - molecular weight size marker - monoclonal antibody - monosaccharide-transporting ATPase - monosomy - morphine 6-dehydrogenase - mouse model - mRNA - multicistronic message - multicopy plasmid - multiple cloning site - multiple endocrine neoplasia, type 1 - mutation - myristoyl-CoA 11-(E) desaturase - myristoyl-CoA 11-(Z) desaturase -

== N ==
N terminus - N-acetylhexosamine 1-dehydrogenase - N-acylmannosamine 1-dehydrogenase - N-formylmethionylaminoacyl-tRNA deformylase - N-isopropylammelide isopropylaminohydrolase - Na+-transporting two-sector ATPase - NADH:ubiquinone reductase (Na+-transporting) - native gel - nematode Her-1 - neolactotetraosylceramide alpha-2,3-sialyltransferase - nested PCR - neurofibromatosis - NH41 - nick (DNA) - nick translation - NIDDM1 - Niemann-Pick disease, type C - nitrate-transporting ATPase - NMNH (Dihydronicotinamide Mononucleotide) - non-coding DNA - non-coding strand - non-directiveness - nonconservative substitution - nonpolar-amino-acid-transporting ATPase - nonsense codon - nonsense mutation - nontranslated RNA - Northern blot - NT - nuclear run-on - nuclease - nuclease protection assay - nucleoplasmin ATPase - nucleoside - nucleoside-triphosphate diphosphatase - nucleotide - Nucleotide universal IDentifier - nucleus -

== O ==
oligo - oligodeoxyribonucleotide - oligonucleotide - oligosaccharide-transporting ATPase - oncogene - oncovirus - open reading frame - operator - operon - origin of replication - ornithine(lysine) transaminase - osteomimicry

== P ==
p53 - package - palindromic sequence - palmitoyl acyltransferase - Parkinson's disease - Partial cleavage stimulation factor domain - pBR322 - PCR - pedigree - peptide - peptide-transporting ATPase - peptide bond - phage - phagemid - phenotype - phenylacetaldoxime dehydratase - PhIP-Seq - phosphatase, alkaline - phosphatidylcholine 12-monooxygenase - phosphatidylcholine desaturase - phosphatidylinositol a-mannosyltransferase - phosphodiester bond - phospholipid acyltransferase - phosphonate-transporting ATPase - phosphorylation - physical map - plant calmodulin-binding domain - plasmid - plastoquinol/plastocyanin reductase - point mutation - poly-A track - polyA tail - polyacrylamide gel - polyclonal antibodies - polydactyly - polymerase - polymerase chain reaction - polymorphism - polynucleotide kinase - polypeptide - polyvinyl-alcohol dehydrogenase (acceptor) - positional cloning - positional sequencing - post-transcriptional regulation - post-translational modification - post-translational processing - post-translational regulation - PRE - precursor mRNA - primary immunodeficiency - primary transcript - primer - primer extension - probe - processivity - progesterone 5alpha-reductase - promoter - pronucleus - prostate cancer - protease - proteasome - proteasome ATPase - protein - Protein translocation - proto-oncogene - pseudobaptigenin synthase - pseudogene - pseudoknot - pseudorevertant - pulse sequence database - pulsed field gel electrophoresis - purine - PyrC leader - PyrD leader - pyrimidine

== R ==
random primed synthesis - reading frame - recessive - recognition sequence - recombinant DNA - recombination - recombination-repair - relaxed DNA - repetitive DNA - replica plating - reporter gene - repression - repressor - residue - response element - restriction - restriction endonuclease - restriction enzyme - restriction fragment - restriction fragment length polymorphism (RFLP) - restriction fragments - restriction map - restriction site - reticulocyte lysate - retrovirus - reverse transcriptase - reverse transcription - revertant - ribonuclease - ribonuclease - ribonucleic acid - riboprobe - ribose-seq - ribosomal-protein-alanine N-acetyltransferase - ribosomal binding sequence - ribosome - ribosyldihydronicotinamide dehydrogenase (quinone) - ribozyme - risk communication - RNA polymerase - RNA splicing - RNAi - RNase - RNase protection assay - rRNA - rRNA (guanine-N2-)-methyltransferase - RT-PCR - Run-on - runoff transcript

== S ==
S1 end mapping - S1 nuclease - satellite DNA - screening - SDS-PAGE - secondary structure - selection - selenium responsive proteins - sense strand - sequence - sequence motif - sequence polymorphism - sequence-tagged site - sequential epitope - severe combined immunodeficiency - sex chromosome - sex-linked - Shine-Dalgarno sequence - shotgun cloning - shotgun cloning or sequencing - shotgun sequencing - shuttle vector - Siah interacting protein N-terminal domain - sickle-cell disease - side chain - sigma factor - signal peptidase - signal sequence - silent mutation - single nucleotide polymorphism - siRNA - site-directed mutagenesis - site-specific recombination - Slc22a21 - slot blot - SNP - Slc22a21 - SMCR2 - snRNA - snRNP - solution hybridization - somatic cells - Southern blot - southwestern blot - SP6 RNA polymerase - SpAB protein domain - spectral karyotype - splicing - Simple Sequence Repeats (SSR) - SPR domain - SQ2397 - SRG1 RNA - ST7-AS2 - ST7-OT3 - stable transfection - start codon - stem-loop - sticky end - stomoxyn - stop codon - streptavidin - stringency - structural motif - sub-cloning - substitution - succinate—citramalate CoA-transferase - suicide gene - sulfate-transporting ATPase - suPARnostic - supercoil - SurE, survival protein E - Syb-prII-1 - syndrome -

== T ==
T7 RNA polymerase - taq polymerase - TATA box - taurochenodeoxycholate 6α-hydroxylase - taxadiene 5alpha-hydroxylase - taxane 10beta-hydroxylase - TAZ zinc finger - Tbf5 protein domain - technology transfer - template - termination codon - terminator - tertiary structure - tet resistance - TGF beta Activation - thymine - tissue-specific expression - tm - trans - trans-feruloyl-CoA hydratase - transcript - transcription - transcription factor - transcription/translation reaction - transcriptional start site - transfection - transformation (genetics) - transformation (with respect to bacteria) - transfection (with respect to cultured cells) - transgene - transgenic - transient transfection - transition - translation - transposition - transposon - transversion - triplet - trisomy - tRNA - tRNA (adenine-N1-)-methyltransferase - tRNA (guanine-N1-)-methyltransferase - tRNA-dihydrouridine synthase - TUG-UBL1 protein domain - tumor suppressor - tumor suppressor gene -

== U ==
UbiD protein domain - ubiquitin—calmodulin ligase - UDP-3-O-N-acetylglucosamine deacetylase - UDP-4-amino-4,6-dideoxy-N-acetyl-alpha-D-glucosamine transaminase - undecaprenyl-phosphate 4-deoxy-4-formamido-L-arabinose transferase - untranslated RNA - upstream - upstream activator sequence - upstream DNA - upstream (transduction) - uracil - uracil/thymine dehydrogenase - ureidoglycolate hydrolase -

== V ==
VAMAS6 - vanillin synthase - VanY protein domain - Var1 protein domain - vax2os1 - vector - VEK-30 protein domain - vinorine hydroxylase - vitamin B12-transporting ATPase - vitamin D binding protein domain III - vitelline membrane outer layer protein I (VMO-I) -

== W ==
WAC protein domain - Western blot - Wfdc15a - WHEP-TRS protein domain - WIF domain - wildtype - wobble position - Wolfram syndrome - WWE protein domain -

== X ==
XPC-binding - XPG I protein domain - Xyloglucan endo-transglycosylase -

== Y ==
YAC (yeast artificial chromosome) - Ycf9 protein domain - YchF-GTPase C terminal protein domain - Ydc2 protein domain - YDG SRA protein domain - YecM bacterial protein domain - YjeF N terminal protein domain - YopH, N-terminal - YopR bacterial protein domain - Y Y Y -

== Z ==
Zeaxanthin 7,8-dioxygenase - Zfp14 zinc finger protein - Zfp28 zinc finger protein - zinc finger - Zinc finger and scan domain containing 30 - Zinc finger containing ubiquitin peptidase 1 - Zinc finger nfx1-type containing 1 - Zinc finger protein 93 - Zinc finger protein 101 - Zinc finger protein 175 - Zinc finger protein 222 - Zinc finger protein 230 - Zinc finger protein 280b - Zinc finger protein 296 - Zinc finger protein 414 - Zinc finger protein 433 - Zinc finger protein 490 - Zinc finger protein 530 - Zinc finger protein 556 - Zinc finger protein 562 - Zinc finger protein 574 - Zinc finger protein 577 - Zinc finger protein 585b - Zinc finger protein 586 - Zinc finger protein 730 - Zinc finger protein 770 - Zinc finger protein 773 - Zinc finger protein 780a - Zinc finger protein 780b - Zinc finger protein 791 - Zinc finger protein 836 - Zinc finger protein 846

== See also ==
- Index of biochemistry articles
