= Carbon-monoxide dehydrogenase (cytochrome b-561) =

Enzyme

carbon-monoxide oxygenase

Identifiers
- EC no.: 1.2.2.4
- CAS no.: 64972-88-9

Databases
- IntEnz: IntEnz view
- BRENDA: BRENDA entry
- ExPASy: NiceZyme view
- KEGG: KEGG entry
- MetaCyc: metabolic pathway
- PRIAM: profile
- PDB structures: RCSB PDB PDBe PDBsum
- Gene Ontology: AmiGO / QuickGO
Search
- PMC: articles
- PubMed: articles
- NCBI: proteins

In enzymology, a carbon-monoxide dehydrogenase (cytochrome b-561) (EC 1.2.2.4) is an enzyme that catalyzes the chemical reaction

CO + H_{2}O + 2 ferricytochrome b-561 $\rightleftharpoons$ CO_{2} + 2 H^{+} + 2 ferrocytochrome b-561

The 3 substrates of this enzyme are CO, H_{2}O, and ferricytochrome b-561, whereas its 3 products are CO_{2}, H^{+}, and ferrocytochrome b-561.

This enzyme belongs to the family of oxidoreductases, specifically those acting on the aldehyde or oxo group of donor with a cytochrome as acceptor. The systematic name of this enzyme class is carbon monoxide,water:cytochrome b-561 oxidoreductase. Other names in common use include carbon monoxide oxidase, carbon monoxide oxygenase (cytochrome b-561), carbon monoxide:methylene blue oxidoreductase, CO dehydrogenase, and carbon-monoxide dehydrogenase.
