= Germacrene A alcohol dehydrogenase =

Identifiers
- EC no.: 1.1.1.314

Databases
- IntEnz: IntEnz view
- BRENDA: BRENDA entry
- ExPASy: NiceZyme view
- KEGG: KEGG entry
- MetaCyc: metabolic pathway
- PRIAM: profile
- PDB structures: RCSB PDB PDBe PDBsum
Search
- PMC: articles
- PubMed: articles
- NCBI: proteins

Germacrene A alcohol dehydrogenase (EC 1.1.1.314) is an enzyme with systematic name germacra-1(10),4,11(13)-trien-12-ol:NADP^{+} oxidoreductase. This enzyme catalyses the following chemical reaction

germacra-1(10),4,11(13)-trien-12-ol + 2 NADP^{+} + H_{2}O $\rightleftharpoons$ germacra-1(10),4,11(13)-trien-12-oate + 2 NADPH + 3 H^{+} (overall reaction)
(1a) germacra-1(10),4,11(13)-trien-12-ol + NADP^{+} $\rightleftharpoons$ germacra-1(10),4,11(13)-trien-12-al + NADPH + H^{+}
(1b) germacra-1(10),4,11(13)-trien-12-al + NADP^{+} + H_{2}O $\rightleftharpoons$ germacra-1(10),4,11(13)-trien-12-oate + NADPH + 2 H^{+}

In Lactuca sativa this enzyme is a multifunctional enzyme with EC 1.14.13.123.
