= L-amino-acid alpha-ligase =

Class of enzymes

Identifiers
- EC no.: 6.3.2.28

Databases
- IntEnz: IntEnz view
- BRENDA: BRENDA entry
- ExPASy: NiceZyme view
- KEGG: KEGG entry
- MetaCyc: metabolic pathway
- PRIAM: profile
- PDB structures: RCSB PDB PDBe PDBsum
Search
- PMC: articles
- PubMed: articles
- NCBI: proteins

In enzymology, an L-amino-acid alpha-ligase (EC 6.3.2.28) is an enzyme that catalyzes the chemical reaction

ATP + an L-amino acid + an L-amino acid $\rightleftharpoons$ ADP + phosphate + L-aminoacyl-L-amino acid

Thus, the two substrates of this enzyme are ATP and L-amino acid, whereas its 3 products are ADP, phosphate, and L-aminoacyl-L-amino acid.

This enzyme belongs to the family of ligases, specifically those forming carbon-nitrogen bonds as acid-D-amino-acid ligases (peptide synthases). The systematic name of this enzyme class is L-amino acid:L-amino acid ligase (ADP-forming). Other names in common use include L-amino acid alpha-ligase, bacilysin synthetase, YwfE, and L-amino acid ligase.
