= HumHot =

HUMHOT

Content
- Description: human meiotic recombination hot spots.
- Organisms: Homo sapiens

Contact
- Primary citation: PMID 16381857

Access
- Website: http://www.jncasr.ac.in/humhot.

HUMHOT is a database of human meiotic recombination hot spot DNA sequences.

== See also ==
- meiotic recombination
