= Slc22a21 =

Solute carrier family 22 (organic cation transporter), member 21 is a protein that in the house mouse is encoded by the Slc22a21 gene. The gene is also known as Octn3 and Slc22a9. Slc22a21 belongs to a protein family of solute carriers.
