= Fragile site, folic acid type, rare, fra(2)(q13) =

Gene in the species Homo sapiens

FRA2B

Identifiers
- Aliases: FRA2B, fragile site, folic acid type, rare, fra(2)(q13)
- External IDs: GeneCards: FRA2B; OMA:FRA2B - orthologs
Orthologs
Species	Human	Mouse
Entrez	2374	n/a
Ensembl	n/a	n/a
UniProt	n a	n/a
RefSeq (mRNA)	n/a	n/a
RefSeq (protein)	n/a	n/a
Location (UCSC)	n/a	n/a
PubMed search		n/a
- Wikidata
View/Edit Human

Fragile site, folic acid type, rare, fra(2)(q13) is a protein that in humans is encoded by the FRA2B gene.
