= Zinc finger protein 836 =

Protein found in humans

ZNF836

Identifiers
- Aliases: ZNF836, zinc finger protein 836
- External IDs: GeneCards: ZNF836

Gene location (Human)
Chr.	Chromosome 19 (human)
Band	19q13.41	Start	52,153,864 bp
Band	19q13.41	End	52,171,643 bp
RNA expression pattern
Bgee	Human / Mouse (ortholog); Top expressed in: buccal mucosa cell; Achilles tendon; right adrenal cortex; left adrenal cortex; ganglionic eminence; epithelium of colon; left ovary; sperm; testicle; right ovary / n/a; More reference expression data
BioGPS	n/a
Gene ontology
Molecular function	DNA-binding transcription factor activity; DNA binding; metal ion binding; nucleic acid binding; DNA-binding transcription factor activity, RNA polymerase II-specific
Cellular component	intracellular anatomical structure; nucleus
Biological process	regulation of transcription, DNA-templated; transcription, DNA-templated; regulation of transcription by RNA polymerase II
Sources:Amigo / QuickGO
Orthologs
Databases	NCBI: entry; OMA: entry
Species	Human	Mouse
Entrez	162962	n/a
Ensembl	ENSG00000196267	n/a
UniProt	Q6ZNA1	n/a
RefSeq (mRNA)	NM_001102657	n/a
RefSeq (protein)	NP_001096127	n/a
Location (UCSC)	Chr 19: 52.15 – 52.17 Mb	n/a
PubMed search		n/a
- Wikidata
View/Edit Human

Zinc finger protein 836 is a protein that in humans is encoded by the ZNF836 gene.
