= PhIP-Seq =

Phage immunoprecipitation sequencing (PhIP-Seq) is method that combines barcoded DNA high-throughput sequencing and proteomics to determine the levels of binding of antibodies to epitopes. It has been used to study the autoantibody repertoire of autoimmune diseases like multiple sclerosis, type 2 diabetes and rheumatoid arthritis.
