= VAMAS6 (gene) =

Genetic element in the species Homo sapiens

Identifiers
- Aliases: VTLGVitiligo
- External IDs: OMIM: 193200; GeneCards: ; OMA:- orthologs
Orthologs
Species	Human	Mouse
Entrez	246319	n/a
Ensembl	n/a	n/a
UniProt	n a	n/a
RefSeq (mRNA)	n/a	n/a
RefSeq (protein)	n/a	n/a
Location (UCSC)	n/a	n/a
PubMed search		n/a
- Wikidata
View/Edit Human

Vitiligo-associated multiple autoimmune disease susceptibility 6 is a protein that in humans is encoded by the VAMAS6 gene.
