= Zinc finger protein 791 =

Protein found in humans

ZNF791

Identifiers
- Aliases: ZNF791, zinc finger protein 791
- External IDs: MGI: 3648473; GeneCards: ZNF791

Gene location (Human)
Chr.	Chromosome 19 (human)
Band	19p13.13	Start	12,610,918 bp
Band	19p13.13	End	12,633,840 bp

Gene location (Mouse)
Chr.	Chromosome 8 (mouse)
Band	8 C3|8	Start	85,835,182 bp
Band	8 C3|8	End	85,849,724 bp
RNA expression pattern
Bgee	Human / Mouse (ortholog); Top expressed in: nipple; pylorus; pericardium; superior surface of tongue; renal medulla; Achilles tendon; trachea; trigeminal ganglion; inferior ganglion of vagus nerve; cardiac muscle tissue of right atrium / Top expressed in: zygote; secondary oocyte; primary oocyte; morula; ganglionic eminence; placenta; visual cortex; neural layer of retina; right kidney; pancreas; More reference expression data
BioGPS	n/a
Gene ontology
Molecular function	metal ion binding; DNA binding; nucleic acid binding; DNA-binding transcription factor activity, RNA polymerase II-specific
Cellular component	nucleus; intracellular anatomical structure
Biological process	regulation of transcription, DNA-templated; transcription, DNA-templated; regulation of transcription by RNA polymerase II
Sources:Amigo / QuickGO
Orthologs
Databases	NCBI: entry; OMA: entry
Species	Human	Mouse
Entrez	163049	244556
Ensembl	ENSG00000173875	ENSMUSG00000074194
UniProt	Q3KP31	Q497V9
RefSeq (mRNA)	NM_153358	NM_001037745; NM_001357366
RefSeq (protein)	NP_699189	NP_001032834; NP_001344295
Location (UCSC)	Chr 19: 12.61 – 12.63 Mb	Chr 8: 85.84 – 85.85 Mb
PubMed search
- Wikidata
View/Edit Human	View/Edit Mouse

Zinc finger protein 791 is a protein that in humans is encoded by the ZNF791 gene.
