= Apo-beta-carotenoid-14',13'-dioxygenase =

Identifiers
- EC no.: 1.13.11.67

Databases
- IntEnz: IntEnz view
- BRENDA: BRENDA entry
- ExPASy: NiceZyme view
- KEGG: KEGG entry
- MetaCyc: metabolic pathway
- PRIAM: profile
- PDB structures: RCSB PDB PDBe PDBsum
- Gene Ontology: AmiGO / QuickGO
Search
- PMC: articles
- PubMed: articles
- NCBI: proteins

Apo-beta-carotenoid-14',13'-dioxygenase (EC 1.13.11.67 is an enzyme that catalyzes the chemical reaction

8'-apo-beta-carotenol + O_{2} $\rightleftharpoons$ 14'-apo-beta-carotenal + uncharacterized product

Thus, the two substrates of this enzyme are 8'-apo-beta-carotenol and oxygen, whereas its two products are 14'-apo-beta-carotenal and an uncharacterized product that may be (3E,5E)-7-hydroxy-6-methylhepta-3,5-dien-2-one.

This enzyme belongs to the family of oxidoreductases, specifically those acting on single donors with O_{2} as oxidant and incorporation of two atoms of oxygen into the substrate (oxygenases). The oxygen incorporated need not be derived from O with incorporation of one atom of oxygen (internal monooxygenases o internal mixed-function oxidases). The systematic name of this enzyme class is 8'-apo-beta-carotenol:O2 oxidoreductase.
