= Methylsterol monooxygenase =

Class of enzymes

Identifiers
- EC no.: 1.14.13.72
- CAS no.: 37256-80-7

Databases
- IntEnz: IntEnz view
- BRENDA: BRENDA entry
- ExPASy: NiceZyme view
- KEGG: KEGG entry
- MetaCyc: metabolic pathway
- PRIAM: profile
- PDB structures: RCSB PDB PDBe PDBsum
Search
- PMC: articles
- PubMed: articles
- NCBI: proteins

Methylsterol monooxygenase (EC 1.14.13.72, methylsterol hydroxylase, 4-methylsterol oxidase, 4,4-dimethyl-5alpha-cholest-7-en-3beta-ol,hydrogen-donor:oxygen oxidoreductase (hydroxylating)) is an enzyme with systematic name 4,4-dimethyl-5alpha-cholest-7-en-3beta-ol,NAD(P)H:oxygen oxidoreductase (hydroxylating). This enzyme catalyses the following chemical reaction

4,4-dimethyl-5alpha-cholest-7-en-3beta-ol + 3 NAD(P)H + 3 H^{+} + 3 O_{2} $\rightleftharpoons$ 3beta-hydroxy-4beta-methyl-5alpha-cholest-7-ene-4alpha-carboxylate + 3 NAD(P)^{+} + 4 H_{2}O (overall reaction)
(1a) 4,4-dimethyl-5alpha-cholest-7-en-3beta-ol + NAD(P)H + H^{+} + O_{2} $\rightleftharpoons$ 4beta-hydroxymethyl-4alpha-methyl-5alpha-cholest-7-en-3beta-ol + NAD(P)^{+} + H_{2}O
(1b) 4beta-hydroxymethyl-4alpha-methyl-5alpha-cholest-7-en-3beta-ol + NAD(P)H + H^{+} + O_{2} $\rightleftharpoons$ 3beta-hydroxy-4beta-methyl-5alpha-cholest-7-ene-4alpha-carbaldehyde + NAD(P)^{+} + 2 H_{2}O
(1c) 3beta-hydroxy-4beta-methyl-5alpha-cholest-7-ene-4alpha-carbaldehyde + NAD(P)H + H^{+} + O_{2} $\rightleftharpoons$ 3beta-hydroxy-4beta-methyl-5alpha-cholest-7-ene-4alpha-carboxylate + NAD(P)^{+} + H_{2}O

Methylsterol monooxygenase requires cytochrome b5.
