= Zinc finger protein 93 =

Protein found in humans

ZNF93

Identifiers
- Aliases: ZNF93, HPF34, HTF34, TF34, ZNF505, zinc finger protein 93
- External IDs: OMIM: 603975; MGI: 2664334; GeneCards: ZNF93

Gene location (Human)
Chr.	Chromosome 19 (human)
Band	19p12	Start	19,900,913 bp
Band	19p12	End	19,963,464 bp

Gene location (Mouse)
Chr.	Chromosome 13 (mouse)
Band	13 B3|13 34.54 cM	Start	67,436,202 bp
Band	13 B3|13 34.54 cM	End	67,454,549 bp
RNA expression pattern
Bgee	Human / Mouse (ortholog); Top expressed in: secondary oocyte; buccal mucosa cell; gonad; embryo; ganglionic eminence; testicle; ventricular zone; thyroid gland; bone marrow; right lobe of thyroid gland / Top expressed in: spermatid; muscle of thigh; white adipose tissue; embryo; muscle tissue; skeletal muscle tissue; neural layer of retina; striatum of neuraxis; uterus; Cortex of frontal lobe; More reference expression data
BioGPS	n/a
Gene ontology
Molecular function	nucleic acid binding; zinc ion binding; DNA-binding transcription factor activity; metal ion binding; DNA binding; transcription cis-regulatory region binding; DNA-binding transcription factor activity, RNA polymerase II-specific
Cellular component	nucleus; intracellular anatomical structure
Biological process	negative regulation of transcription, DNA-templated; regulation of transcription, DNA-templated; negative regulation of transposon integration; transcription, DNA-templated; regulation of transcription by RNA polymerase II
Sources:Amigo / QuickGO
Orthologs
Databases	NCBI: entry; OMA: entry
Species	Human	Mouse
Entrez	81931	431706
Ensembl	ENSG00000184635	ENSMUSG00000055341
UniProt	P35789	n/a
RefSeq (mRNA)	NM_001004126; NM_031218	NM_001003666
RefSeq (protein)	NP_112495	n/a
Location (UCSC)	Chr 19: 19.9 – 19.96 Mb	Chr 13: 67.44 – 67.45 Mb
PubMed search
- Wikidata
View/Edit Human	View/Edit Mouse

Zinc finger protein 93 is a protein that in humans is encoded by the ZNF93 gene.
