= Fat storage-inducing transmembrane protein 2 =

Fat storage-inducing transmembrane protein 2 (FITM2) affects the formation of triglyceride lipid droplets (LD). It is expressed in high quantities in the endoplasmic reticulum of adipose tissues. FIT2 is part of the FIT protein family. These proteins are present in most life forms with FIT1 and FIT2 specifically present in mammals. While the exact mechanism is unknown, knockout studies in mice produce lipotrophy and metabolic deficiencies. The lipotrophy was also shown to increase with age. Without FIT2, mice form fewer and smaller LDs. In the body, store fats act as a reservoir of energy. In times of growth or caloric deficit, these fats are hydrolyzed and used. The implications of being unable to store triglycerides include the inability to survive brief periods of starvation or times of rapid growth. Recently, it has been suggested that FIT2 is a regulator of triglyceride biosynthesis. The overall importance of the FIT2 protein, and other members of the FIT family, is exhibited in the high degree of conservation throughout organisms.
