= Zinc finger protein 490 =

Protein found in humans

ZNF490

Identifiers
- Aliases: ZNF490, zinc finger protein 490
- External IDs: GeneCards: ZNF490

Gene location (Human)
Chr.	Chromosome 19 (human)
Band	19p13.2-p13.13	Start	12,576,100 bp
Band	19p13.2-p13.13	End	12,640,098 bp
RNA expression pattern
Bgee	Human / Mouse (ortholog); Top expressed in: buccal mucosa cell; tendon of biceps brachii; internal globus pallidus; sural nerve; testicle; Achilles tendon; gonad; bone marrow cell; white blood cell; monocyte / n/a; More reference expression data
BioGPS	n/a
Gene ontology
Molecular function	DNA-binding transcription factor activity; DNA binding; protein binding; metal ion binding; nucleic acid binding; DNA-binding transcription factor activity, RNA polymerase II-specific
Cellular component	intracellular anatomical structure; nucleus
Biological process	regulation of transcription, DNA-templated; transcription, DNA-templated; regulation of transcription by RNA polymerase II
Sources:Amigo / QuickGO
Orthologs
Databases	NCBI: entry; OMA: entry
Species	Human	Mouse
Entrez	57474	n/a
Ensembl	ENSG00000188033	n/a
UniProt	Q9ULM2	n/a
RefSeq (mRNA)	NM_020714	n/a
RefSeq (protein)	NP_065765	n/a
Location (UCSC)	Chr 19: 12.58 – 12.64 Mb	n/a
PubMed search		n/a
- Wikidata
View/Edit Human

Zinc finger protein 490 is a protein that in humans is encoded by the ZNF490 gene.
