= Phosphatidylcholine desaturase =

phosphatidylcholine desaturase

Identifiers
- EC no.: 1.14.19.22
- CAS no.: 59929-36-1

Databases
- IntEnz: IntEnz view
- BRENDA: BRENDA entry
- ExPASy: NiceZyme view
- KEGG: KEGG entry
- MetaCyc: metabolic pathway
- PRIAM: profile
- PDB structures: RCSB PDB PDBe PDBsum
- Gene Ontology: AmiGO / QuickGO
Search
- PMC: articles
- PubMed: articles
- NCBI: proteins

In enzymology, a phosphatidylcholine desaturase (EC 1.14.19.22, previously EC 1.3.1.35) is an enzyme that catalyzes the chemical reaction

1-acyl-2-oleoyl-sn-glycero-3-phosphocholine + NAD^{+} $\rightleftharpoons$ 1-acyl-2-linoleoyl-sn-glycero-3-phosphocholine + NADH + H^{+}

Thus, the two substrates of this enzyme are 1-acyl-2-oleoyl-sn-glycero-3-phosphocholine and NAD^{+}, whereas its 3 products are 1-acyl-2-linoleoyl-sn-glycero-3-phosphocholine, NADH, and H^{+}.

This enzyme belongs to the family of oxidoreductases, specifically those acting on the CH-CH group of donor with NAD+ or NADP+ as acceptor. The systematic name of this enzyme class is 1-acyl-2-oleoyl-sn-glycero-3-phosphocholine:NAD+ Delta12-oxidoreductase. Other names in common use include oleate desaturase, linoleate synthase, oleoyl-CoA desaturase, and oleoylphosphatidylcholine desaturase.
