= Zinc finger protein 433 =

Protein found in humans

ZNF433

Identifiers
- Aliases: ZNF433, zinc finger protein 433
- External IDs: MGI: 5592537; GeneCards: ZNF433

Gene location (Human)
Chr.	Chromosome 19 (human)
Band	19p13.2	Start	12,014,715 bp
Band	19p13.2	End	12,035,741 bp
RNA expression pattern
Bgee	Human / Mouse (ortholog); Top expressed in: right testis; left testis; testicle; gonad; endometrium; ventricular zone; Achilles tendon; body of pancreas; kidney; human kidney / n/a; More reference expression data
BioGPS	n/a
Gene ontology
Molecular function	DNA binding; protein binding; metal ion binding; nucleic acid binding; DNA-binding transcription factor activity, RNA polymerase II-specific
Cellular component	intracellular anatomical structure; nucleus
Biological process	regulation of transcription, DNA-templated; transcription, DNA-templated; regulation of transcription by RNA polymerase II
Sources:Amigo / QuickGO
Orthologs
Databases	NCBI: entry; OMA: entry
Species	Human	Mouse
Entrez	163059	102636264
Ensembl	ENSG00000197647	n/a
UniProt	Q8N7K0	n/a
RefSeq (mRNA)	NM_001080411; NM_001308346; NM_001308348; NM_001308351; NM_001308355 NM_001308357; NM_152602	XM_011243615
RefSeq (protein)	NP_001073880; NP_001295275; NP_001295277; NP_001295280; NP_001295284 NP_001295286	n/a
Location (UCSC)	Chr 19: 12.01 – 12.04 Mb	n/a
PubMed search
- Wikidata
View/Edit Human	View/Edit Mouse

Zinc finger protein 433 is a protein that in humans is encoded by the ZNF433 gene.
