= 3(or 17)a-hydroxysteroid dehydrogenase =

Class of enzymes

3(or 17)alpha-hydroxysteroid dehydrogenase

Identifiers
- EC no.: 1.1.1.209
- CAS no.: 83294-77-3

Databases
- IntEnz: IntEnz view
- BRENDA: BRENDA entry
- ExPASy: NiceZyme view
- KEGG: KEGG entry
- MetaCyc: metabolic pathway
- PRIAM: profile
- PDB structures: RCSB PDB PDBe PDBsum
Search
- PMC: articles
- PubMed: articles
- NCBI: proteins

3(or 17)alpha-hydroxysteroid dehydrogenase (EC 1.1.1.209, 3(17)alpha-hydroxysteroid dehydrogenase) is an enzyme with systematic name 3(or 17)alpha-hydroxysteroid:NAD(P)^{+} oxidoreductase. This enzyme catalyses the chemical reaction

androsterone + NAD(P)+ $\rightleftharpoons$ 5alpha-androstane-3,17-dione + NAD(P)H + H^{+}

This enzyme acts on the 3alpha-hydroxy group of androgens of the 5alpha-androstane series; and also, more slowly, on the 17alpha-hydroxy group of both androgenic and estrogenic substrates (cf. EC 1.1.1.51 3(or 17)beta-hydroxysteroid dehydrogenase).
