= 6-endo-hydroxycineole dehydrogenase =

Class of enzymes

Identifiers
- EC no.: 1.1.1.241
- CAS no.: 122933-68-0

Databases
- IntEnz: IntEnz view
- BRENDA: BRENDA entry
- ExPASy: NiceZyme view
- KEGG: KEGG entry
- MetaCyc: metabolic pathway
- PRIAM: profile
- PDB structures: RCSB PDB PDBe PDBsum
- Gene Ontology: AmiGO / QuickGO
Search
- PMC: articles
- PubMed: articles
- NCBI: proteins

In enzymology, a 6-endo-hydroxycineole dehydrogenase (EC 1.1.1.241) is an enzyme that catalyzes the chemical reaction

6-endo-hydroxycineole + NAD^{+} $\rightleftharpoons$ 6-oxocineole + NADH + H^{+}

Thus, the two substrates of this enzyme are 6-endo-hydroxycineole and NAD^{+}, whereas its 3 products are 6-oxocineole, NADH, and H^{+}.

This enzyme belongs to the family of oxidoreductases, specifically those acting on the CH-OH group of donor with NAD^{+} or NADP^{+} as acceptor. The systematic name of this enzyme class is 6-endo-hydroxycineole:NAD^{+} 6-oxidoreductase. This enzyme participates in terpenoid biosynthesis.
