= Progesterone 5alpha-reductase =

Catalyzing enzyme

progesterone 5-alpha-reductase

Identifiers
- EC no.: 1.3.1.22
- CAS no.: 72412-84-1

Databases
- IntEnz: IntEnz view
- BRENDA: BRENDA entry
- ExPASy: NiceZyme view
- KEGG: KEGG entry
- MetaCyc: metabolic pathway
- PRIAM: profile
- PDB structures: RCSB PDB PDBe PDBsum
- Gene Ontology: AmiGO / QuickGO
Search
- PMC: articles
- PubMed: articles
- NCBI: proteins

In enzymology, a progesterone 5alpha-reductase (EC 1.3.1.22) is an enzyme that catalyzes the chemical reaction

5alpha-pregnan-3,20-dione + NADP^{+} $\rightleftharpoons$ progesterone + NADPH + H^{+}

Thus, the two substrates of this enzyme are 5alpha-pregnan-3,20-dione and NADP^{+}, whereas its 3 products are progesterone, NADPH, and H^{+}.

This enzyme belongs to the family of oxidoreductases, specifically those acting on the CH-CH group of donor with NAD+ or NADP+ as acceptor. It is a C21-steroid hormone that is a 5α-pregnane substituted with a oxo groups at positions 3 and 20. It is an intermediate in the conversion of progesterone to allopregnalone and isopregnanolone, other common forms of neurosteroids. The systematic name of this enzyme class is 5alpha-pregnan-3,20-dione:NADP+ 5-oxidoreductase. Other names in common use include steroid 5-alpha-reductase, and Delta4-steroid 5alpha-reductase (progesterone).
