= Zinc finger protein 586 =

Protein found in humans

ZNF586

Identifiers
- Aliases: ZNF586, zinc finger protein 586
- External IDs: GeneCards: ZNF586

Gene location (Human)
Chr.	Chromosome 19 (human)
Band	19q13.43	Start	57,769,655 bp
Band	19q13.43	End	57,819,939 bp
RNA expression pattern
Bgee	Human / Mouse (ortholog); Top expressed in: secondary oocyte; monocyte; blood; gonad; granulocyte; ganglionic eminence; minor salivary glands; ventricular zone; bone marrow; bone marrow cell / n/a; More reference expression data
BioGPS	n/a
Gene ontology
Molecular function	DNA binding; metal ion binding; nucleic acid binding; DNA-binding transcription factor activity, RNA polymerase II-specific
Cellular component	intracellular anatomical structure; nucleus
Biological process	transcription, DNA-templated; regulation of transcription, DNA-templated; negative regulation of transcription, DNA-templated; regulation of transcription by RNA polymerase II
Sources:Amigo / QuickGO
Orthologs
Databases	NCBI: entry; OMA: entry
Species	Human	Mouse
Entrez	54807	n/a
Ensembl	ENSG00000083828	n/a
UniProt	Q9NXT0	n/a
RefSeq (mRNA)	NM_017652; NM_001077426; NM_001204814	n/a
RefSeq (protein)	NP_001070894; NP_001191743; NP_060122	n/a
Location (UCSC)	Chr 19: 57.77 – 57.82 Mb	n/a
PubMed search		n/a
- Wikidata
View/Edit Human

Zinc finger protein 586 is a protein that in humans is encoded by the ZNF586 gene.
