= Trans-feruloyl-CoA hydratase =

trans-feruloyl-CoA hydratase

Identifiers
- EC no.: 4.2.1.101
- CAS no.: 197462-62-7

Databases
- IntEnz: IntEnz view
- BRENDA: BRENDA entry
- ExPASy: NiceZyme view
- KEGG: KEGG entry
- MetaCyc: metabolic pathway
- PRIAM: profile
- PDB structures: RCSB PDB PDBe PDBsum
- Gene Ontology: AmiGO / QuickGO
Search
- PMC: articles
- PubMed: articles
- NCBI: proteins

In enzymology, a trans-feruloyl-CoA hydratase (EC 4.2.1.101) is an enzyme that catalyzes the chemical reaction

4-hydroxy-3-methoxyphenyl-beta-hydroxypropanoyl-CoA $\rightleftharpoons$ trans-feruloyl-CoA + H_{2}O

Hence, this enzyme has one substrate, 4-hydroxy-3-methoxyphenyl-beta-hydroxypropanoyl-CoA, and two products, trans-feruloyl-CoA and H_{2}O.

This enzyme belongs to the family of lyases, specifically the hydro-lyases, which cleave carbon-oxygen bonds. The systematic name of this enzyme class is 4-hydroxy-3-methoxyphenyl-beta-hydroxypropanoyl-CoA hydro-lyase (trans-feruloyl-CoA-forming). This enzyme is also called trans-feruloyl-CoA hydro-lyase (incorrect).

== Structural studies ==
As of late 2007, only one structure has been solved for this class of enzymes, with the PDB accession code 2J5I.
