= 3110001I22Rik =

Mouse protein

RIKEN cDNA 3110001I22 is a protein that in the house mouse is encoded by the 3110001I22Rik gene.
