= ZFP14 zinc finger protein =

Protein-coding gene in the species Homo sapiens

ZFP14

Identifiers
- Aliases: ZFP14, ZNF531, ZFP14 zinc finger protein
- External IDs: MGI: 99160; GeneCards: ZFP14

Gene location (Human)
Chr.	Chromosome 19 (human)
Band	19q13.12	Start	36,334,453 bp
Band	19q13.12	End	36,379,201 bp

Gene location (Mouse)
Chr.	Chromosome 7 (mouse)
Band	7|7 B1	Start	30,036,359 bp
Band	7|7 B1	End	30,051,380 bp
RNA expression pattern
Bgee	Human / Mouse (ortholog); Top expressed in: ganglionic eminence; gonad; Achilles tendon; ventricular zone; testicle; corpus callosum; right uterine tube; C1 segment; white blood cell; prefrontal cortex / Top expressed in: urethra; Rostral migratory stream; male urethra; lumbar subsegment of spinal cord; substantia nigra; superior frontal gyrus; cerebellar cortex; muscle of thigh; fossa; facial motor nucleus; More reference expression data
BioGPS	n/a
Gene ontology
Molecular function	DNA-binding transcription factor activity; DNA binding; metal ion binding; nucleic acid binding; DNA-binding transcription factor activity, RNA polymerase II-specific
Cellular component	intracellular anatomical structure; nucleus
Biological process	regulation of transcription, DNA-templated; transcription, DNA-templated; regulation of transcription by RNA polymerase II; blastocyst hatching
Sources:Amigo / QuickGO
Orthologs
Databases	NCBI: entry; OMA: entry
Species	Human	Mouse
Entrez	57677	243906
Ensembl	ENSG00000142065	ENSMUSG00000053985
UniProt	Q9HCL3	P10755
RefSeq (mRNA)	NM_001297619; NM_020917	NM_011748; NM_178733; NM_001358860
RefSeq (protein)	NP_001284548; NP_065968	NP_035878; NP_848848; NP_001345789
Location (UCSC)	Chr 19: 36.33 – 36.38 Mb	Chr 7: 30.04 – 30.05 Mb
PubMed search
- Wikidata
View/Edit Human	View/Edit Mouse

ZFP14 zinc finger protein is a protein that in humans is encoded by the ZFP14 gene.
