= Linoleate diol synthase =

Identifiers
- EC no.: 1.13.11.44

Databases
- IntEnz: IntEnz view
- BRENDA: BRENDA entry
- ExPASy: NiceZyme view
- KEGG: KEGG entry
- MetaCyc: metabolic pathway
- PRIAM: profile
- PDB structures: RCSB PDB PDBe PDBsum
Search
- PMC: articles
- PubMed: articles
- NCBI: proteins

In enzymology, a linoleate diol synthase (EC 1.13.11.44) is an enzyme that catalyzes the chemical reaction

linoleate + O_{2} $\rightleftharpoons$ (9Z,12Z)-(7S,8S)-dihydroxyoctadeca-9,12-dienoate

Thus, the two substrates of this enzyme are linoleate and O_{2}, whereas its product is (9Z,12Z)-(7S,8S)-dihydroxyoctadeca-9,12-dienoate.

This enzyme belongs to the family of oxidoreductases, specifically those acting on single donors with O_{2} as oxidant and incorporation of two atoms of oxygen into the substrate (oxygenases). The oxygen incorporated need not be derived from O_{2}. The systematic name of this enzyme class is linoleate:oxygen 7S,8S-oxidoreductase. This enzyme is also called linoleate (8R)-dioxygenase. This enzyme participates in linoleic acid metabolism.
