= Zinc finger protein 175 =

Protein found in humans

ZNF175

Identifiers
- Aliases: ZNF175, OTK18, zinc finger protein 175
- External IDs: OMIM: 601139; MGI: 1917180; GeneCards: ZNF175

Gene location (Human)
Chr.	Chromosome 19 (human)
Band	19q13.41	Start	51,571,283 bp
Band	19q13.41	End	51,592,510 bp

Gene location (Mouse)
Chr.	Chromosome 7 (mouse)
Band	7|7 B3	Start	42,945,621 bp
Band	7|7 B3	End	42,962,718 bp
RNA expression pattern
Bgee	Human / Mouse (ortholog); Top expressed in: dorsal motor nucleus of vagus nerve; inferior olivary nucleus; germinal epithelium; caput epididymis; corpus epididymis; internal globus pallidus; cardia; tibia; tail of epididymis; stromal cell of endometrium / Top expressed in: otolith organ; utricle; lumbar spinal ganglion; interventricular septum; hand; renal corpuscle; retinal pigment epithelium; trigeminal ganglion; left lung lobe; medullary collecting duct; More reference expression data
BioGPS	n/a
Gene ontology
Molecular function	DNA-binding transcription factor activity; metal ion binding; DNA binding; nucleic acid binding; protein binding; RNA polymerase II transcription regulatory region sequence-specific DNA binding; DNA-binding transcription repressor activity, RNA polymerase II-specific; DNA-binding transcription activator activity, RNA polymerase II-specific; DNA-binding transcription factor activity, RNA polymerase II-specific
Cellular component	intermediate filament cytoskeleton; nucleus; nucleoplasm; intracellular anatomical structure; cytoplasm; cytosol
Biological process	regulation of transcription, DNA-templated; transcription, DNA-templated; defense response to virus; negative regulation of transcription by RNA polymerase II; transcription by RNA polymerase II; positive regulation of transcription by RNA polymerase II
Sources:Amigo / QuickGO
Orthologs
Databases	NCBI: entry; OMA: entry
Species	Human	Mouse
Entrez	7728	69930
Ensembl	ENSG00000105497	ENSMUSG00000012640
UniProt	Q9Y473	n/a
RefSeq (mRNA)	NM_007147	NM_027264; NM_001357811; NM_001357812
RefSeq (protein)	NP_009078	n/a
Location (UCSC)	Chr 19: 51.57 – 51.59 Mb	Chr 7: 42.95 – 42.96 Mb
PubMed search
- Wikidata
View/Edit Human	View/Edit Mouse

Zinc finger protein 175 is a protein that in humans is encoded by the ZNF175 gene.
