= Wfdc15a =

Protein-coding gene in the species Mus musculus

WAP four-disulfide core domain protein 15A

Identifiers
- Organism: Mus musculus
- Symbol: Wfdc15a
- Entrez: 68221
- HomoloGene: 77715
- RefSeq (mRNA): NM_183271.2
- RefSeq (Prot): NP_899094.1
- UniProt: Q8BH89

Other data
- Chromosome: 2: 164.04 - 164.04 Mb
Search for
- Structures: Swiss-model
- Domains: InterPro

WAP four-disulfide core domain 15A is a protein that in the mouse is encoded by the Wfdc15a gene.
