= Zinc finger protein 101 =

Protein found in humans

ZNF101

Identifiers
- Aliases: ZNF101, HZF12, zinc finger protein 101
- External IDs: OMIM: 603983; GeneCards: ZNF101

Gene location (Human)
| Chr. | Chromosome 19 (human) |
| Band | 19p13.11 | Start | 19,668,796 bp |
| Band | 19p13.11 | End | 19,683,509 bp |
RNA expression pattern
| Bgee | Human / Mouse (ortholog); Top expressed in: buccal mucosa cell; secondary oocyte; mucosa of ileum; lymph node; blood; gonad; epithelium of colon; appendix; bone marrow cell; granulocyte / n/a; More reference expression data |
| BioGPS | n/a |
Gene ontology
| Molecular function | DNA binding; protein binding; metal ion binding; nucleic acid binding; DNA-binding transcription factor activity, RNA polymerase II-specific |
| Cellular component | intracellular anatomical structure; nucleus |
| Biological process | regulation of transcription, DNA-templated; transcription, DNA-templated; regulation of transcription by RNA polymerase II |
Sources:Amigo / QuickGO
Orthologs
| Databases | NCBI: entry; OMA: entry |
| Species | Human | Mouse |
| Entrez | 94039 | n/a |
| Ensembl | ENSG00000181896 | n/a |
| UniProt | Q8IZC7 | n/a |
| RefSeq (mRNA) | NM_001300949; NM_033204 | n/a |
| RefSeq (protein) | NP_001287878; NP_149981 | n/a |
| Location (UCSC) | Chr 19: 19.67 – 19.68 Mb | n/a |
| PubMed search | | n/a |
- Wikidata
| View/Edit Human |

Zinc finger protein 101 is a protein that in humans is encoded by the ZNF101 gene.

== Function ==
Zinc finger proteins (ZNFs), such as ZNF101, bind nucleic acids and perform many key functions, the most important of which is regulating transcription (summary by Bellefroid et al., 1993 [PubMed 8467795]). See ZNF91 (MIM 603971) for general information on ZNFs.
