= Zinc finger protein 770 =

Protein found in humans

ZNF770

Identifiers
- Aliases: ZNF770, PRO1914, zinc finger protein 770
- External IDs: MGI: 2445100; GeneCards: ZNF770

Gene location (Human)
Chr.	Chromosome 15 (human)
Band	15q14	Start	34,978,341 bp
Band	15q14	End	34,988,287 bp

Gene location (Mouse)
Chr.	Chromosome 2 (mouse)
Band	2|2 E4	Start	114,023,942 bp
Band	2|2 E4	End	114,031,950 bp
RNA expression pattern
Bgee	Human / Mouse (ortholog); Top expressed in: skin of arm; corpus epididymis; gingival epithelium; human penis; caput epididymis; superior surface of tongue; mucosa of pharynx; renal medulla; body of tongue; oral cavity / Top expressed in: hand; digastric muscle; atrioventricular valve; triceps brachii muscle; soleus muscle; gastrocnemius muscle; knee joint; vas deferens; vastus lateralis muscle; medial geniculate nucleus; More reference expression data
BioGPS	n/a
Gene ontology
Molecular function	DNA binding; metal ion binding; nucleic acid binding; DNA-binding transcription factor activity, RNA polymerase II-specific
Cellular component	nucleus
Biological process	regulation of transcription, DNA-templated; transcription, DNA-templated; regulation of transcription by RNA polymerase II
Sources:Amigo / QuickGO
Orthologs
Databases	NCBI: entry; OMA: entry
Species	Human	Mouse
Entrez	54989	228491
Ensembl	ENSG00000198146	ENSMUSG00000040321
UniProt	Q6IQ21	Q8BIQ8
RefSeq (mRNA)	NM_014106	NM_175466
RefSeq (protein)	NP_054825	NP_780675
Location (UCSC)	Chr 15: 34.98 – 34.99 Mb	Chr 2: 114.02 – 114.03 Mb
PubMed search
- Wikidata
View/Edit Human	View/Edit Mouse

Zinc finger protein 770 is a protein that in humans is encoded by the ZNF770 gene.
