= 2010107G12Rik =

Mouse protein

RIKEN cDNA 2010107G12 is a protein that in the house mouse is encoded by the 2010107G12Rik gene. The gene is also known as Gm468.
