= ZFP28 zinc finger protein =

Protein-coding gene in the species Homo sapiens

ZFP28

Identifiers
- Aliases: ZFP28, mkr5, ZFP28 zinc finger protein
- External IDs: OMIM: 616798; MGI: 99175; GeneCards: ZFP28
Available structures
PDB	Ortholog search: PDBe RCSB
PDB	List of PDB id codes 2EM2, 2EM3, 2EM4, 2EMJ, 2EMK, 2EML, 2EN9, 2ENH, 2EOH, 2EP0, 2EPX, 2EPZ, 2YTM

Gene location (Human)
Chr.	Chromosome 19 (human)
Band	19q13.43	Start	56,538,948 bp
Band	19q13.43	End	56,556,808 bp

Gene location (Mouse)
Chr.	Chromosome 7 (mouse)
Band	7|7 A1	Start	6,386,294 bp
Band	7|7 A1	End	6,399,914 bp
RNA expression pattern
Bgee	Human / Mouse (ortholog); Top expressed in: gonad; tibialis anterior muscle; ganglionic eminence; C1 segment; Achilles tendon; testicle; left ovary; Brodmann area 9; cerebellar hemisphere; ventricular zone / Top expressed in: lumbar subsegment of spinal cord; urethra; otic vesicle; neural layer of retina; male urethra; granulocyte; primary oocyte; embryo; ganglionic eminence; neural tube; More reference expression data
BioGPS	n/a
Gene ontology
Molecular function	DNA-binding transcription factor activity; DNA binding; metal ion binding; nucleic acid binding; DNA-binding transcription factor activity, RNA polymerase II-specific
Cellular component	intracellular anatomical structure; nucleus
Biological process	regulation of transcription, DNA-templated; transcription, DNA-templated; regulation of transcription by RNA polymerase II
Sources:Amigo / QuickGO
Orthologs
Databases	NCBI: entry; OMA: entry
Species	Human	Mouse
Entrez	140612	22690
Ensembl	ENSG00000196867	ENSMUSG00000062861
UniProt	Q8NHY6	P10078
RefSeq (mRNA)	NM_001308440; NM_020828	NM_175247
RefSeq (protein)	NP_001295369; NP_065879	NP_780456
Location (UCSC)	Chr 19: 56.54 – 56.56 Mb	Chr 7: 6.39 – 6.4 Mb
PubMed search
- Wikidata
View/Edit Human	View/Edit Mouse

ZFP28 zinc finger protein is a protein that in humans is encoded by the ZFP28 gene.
