= K+-transporting ATPase =

Class of enzymes

potassium-transporting ATPase

Identifiers
- EC no.: 3.6.3.12

Databases
- IntEnz: IntEnz view
- BRENDA: BRENDA entry
- ExPASy: NiceZyme view
- KEGG: KEGG entry
- MetaCyc: metabolic pathway
- PRIAM: profile
- PDB structures: RCSB PDB PDBe PDBsum
- Gene Ontology: AmiGO / QuickGO
Search
- PMC: articles
- PubMed: articles
- NCBI: proteins

In enzymology, a K^{+}-transporting ATPase (EC 3.6.3.12) is an enzyme that catalyzes the chemical reaction

ATP + H_{2}O + K^{+}out ⇌ ADP + phosphate + K^{+}in

The 3 substrates of this enzyme are ATP, H_{2}O, and K^{+}, whereas its 3 products are ADP, phosphate, and K+.

This enzyme belongs to the family of hydrolases, specifically those acting on acid anhydrides to catalyse transmembrane movement of substances. The systematic name of this enzyme class is ATP phosphohydrolase (K^{+}-importing). Other names in common use include K^{+}-translocating Kdp-ATPase, and multi-subunit K^{+}-transport ATPase. This enzyme participates in two-component system - general.

== Structural studies ==
As of late 2007, 4 structures have been solved for this class of enzymes, with PDB accession codes 1SVJ, 1U7Q, 2A00, and 2A29.
