= LINC02384 =

Non-coding RNA in humans

Identifiers
- Aliases: LINC02384, uncharacterized LOC100507195, long intergenic non-protein coding RNA 2384
- External IDs: GeneCards: LINC02384
Orthologs
Databases	NCBI: entry; OMA: entry
Species	Human	Mouse
Entrez	100507195	n/a
Ensembl	ENSG00000251301	n/a
UniProt	n a	n/a
RefSeq (mRNA)	n/a	n/a
RefSeq (protein)	n/a	n/a
Location (UCSC)	n/a	n/a
PubMed search		n/a
- Wikidata
View/Edit Human

Long independently transcribed non-coding RNA 2384 is a non-coding RNA that in humans is encoded by the gene LINC02384, previously denoted LOC100507195.
