= Zinc finger protein 562 =

Protein found in humans

ZNF562

Identifiers
- Aliases: ZNF562, zinc finger protein 562
- External IDs: GeneCards: ZNF562

Gene location (Human)
Chr.	Chromosome 19 (human)
Band	19p13.2	Start	9,641,807 bp
Band	19p13.2	End	9,675,100 bp
RNA expression pattern
Bgee	Human / Mouse (ortholog); Top expressed in: buccal mucosa cell; nipple; amniotic fluid; pylorus; mucosa of paranasal sinus; seminal vesicula; visceral pleura; mucosa of sigmoid colon; inferior ganglion of vagus nerve; parietal pleura / n/a; More reference expression data
BioGPS	n/a
Gene ontology
Molecular function	DNA binding; metal ion binding; nucleic acid binding; DNA-binding transcription factor activity, RNA polymerase II-specific
Cellular component	intracellular anatomical structure; nucleus
Biological process	transcription, DNA-templated; regulation of transcription, DNA-templated; regulation of transcription by RNA polymerase II
Sources:Amigo / QuickGO
Orthologs
Databases	NCBI: entry; OMA: entry
Species	Human	Mouse
Entrez	54811	n/a
Ensembl	ENSG00000171466	n/a
UniProt	Q6V9R5	n/a
RefSeq (mRNA)	NM_001130031; NM_001130032; NM_001300885; NM_017656	n/a
RefSeq (protein)	NP_001123503; NP_001123504; NP_001287814; NP_060126	n/a
Location (UCSC)	Chr 19: 9.64 – 9.68 Mb	n/a
PubMed search		n/a
- Wikidata
View/Edit Human

Zinc finger protein 562 is a protein that in humans is encoded by the ZNF562 gene.
