= Atrial septal defect 1 =

Genetic element in the humans

ASD1

Identifiers
- Aliases: ASD1, atrial septal defect 1
- External IDs: GeneCards: ASD1; OMA:ASD1 - orthologs
Orthologs
Species	Human	Mouse
Entrez	431	n/a
Ensembl	n/a	n/a
UniProt	n a	n/a
RefSeq (mRNA)	n/a	n/a
RefSeq (protein)	n/a	n/a
Location (UCSC)	n/a	n/a
PubMed search		n/a
- Wikidata
View/Edit Human

Atrial septal defect 1 is a protein that in humans is encoded by the ASD1 gene.
