= Diethyl 2-methyl-3-oxosuccinate reductase =

diethyl 2-methyl-3-oxosuccinate reductase

Identifiers
- EC no.: 1.1.1.229
- CAS no.: 110369-21-6

Databases
- IntEnz: IntEnz view
- BRENDA: BRENDA entry
- ExPASy: NiceZyme view
- KEGG: KEGG entry
- MetaCyc: metabolic pathway
- PRIAM: profile
- PDB structures: RCSB PDB PDBe PDBsum
- Gene Ontology: AmiGO / QuickGO
Search
- PMC: articles
- PubMed: articles
- NCBI: proteins

In enzymology, a diethyl 2-methyl-3-oxosuccinate reductase (EC 1.1.1.229) is an enzyme that catalyzes the chemical reaction

diethyl (2R,3R)-2-methyl-3-hydroxysuccinate + NADP^{+} $\rightleftharpoons$ diethyl 2-methyl-3-oxosuccinate + NADPH + H^{+}

Thus, the two substrates of this enzyme are diethyl (2R,3R)-2-methyl-3-hydroxysuccinate and NADP^{+}, whereas its 3 products are diethyl 2-methyl-3-oxosuccinate, NADPH, and H^{+}.

This enzyme belongs to the family of oxidoreductases, specifically those acting on the CH-OH group of donor with NAD^{+} or NADP^{+} as acceptor. The systematic name of this enzyme class is diethyl-(2R,3R)-2-methyl-3-hydroxysuccinate:NADP^{+} 3-oxidoreductase.
