= Zinc finger protein 296 =

Protein found in humans

ZNF296

Identifiers
- Aliases: ZNF296, ZFP296, ZNF342, zinc finger protein 296
- External IDs: OMIM: 613226; MGI: 1926956; GeneCards: ZNF296

Gene location (Human)
Chr.	Chromosome 19 (human)
Band	19q13.32	Start	45,071,500 bp
Band	19q13.32	End	45,076,478 bp

Gene location (Mouse)
Chr.	Chromosome 7 (mouse)
Band	7|7 A3	Start	19,311,212 bp
Band	7|7 A3	End	19,314,581 bp
RNA expression pattern
Bgee	Human / Mouse (ortholog); Top expressed in: gonad; granulocyte; nasal epithelium; monocyte; testicle; mucosa of transverse colon; blood; skin of abdomen; parotid gland; spleen / Top expressed in: primary oocyte; zygote; secondary oocyte; morula; blastocyst; granulocyte; right ventricle; hair follicle; lip; embryo; More reference expression data
BioGPS	n/a
Gene ontology
Molecular function	metal ion binding; nucleic acid binding; molecular function; DNA-binding transcription factor activity, RNA polymerase II-specific; DNA-binding transcription activator activity, RNA polymerase II-specific; DNA-binding transcription factor activity; sequence-specific DNA binding; transcription factor binding
Cellular component	nucleus; cellular component
Biological process	negative regulation of transcription by RNA polymerase II; transcription, DNA-templated; regulation of transcription, DNA-templated; spermatogenesis; positive regulation of transcription by RNA polymerase II
Sources:Amigo / QuickGO
Orthologs
Databases	NCBI: entry; OMA: entry
Species	Human	Mouse
Entrez	162979	63872
Ensembl	ENSG00000170684	ENSMUSG00000011267
UniProt	Q8WUU4	E9Q6W4
RefSeq (mRNA)	NM_145288	NM_022409
RefSeq (protein)	NP_660331	NP_071854
Location (UCSC)	Chr 19: 45.07 – 45.08 Mb	Chr 7: 19.31 – 19.31 Mb
PubMed search
- Wikidata
View/Edit Human	View/Edit Mouse

Zinc finger protein 296 is a protein that in humans is encoded by the ZNF296 gene.
