= Catalase-related immune-responsive domain =

Catalase-rel
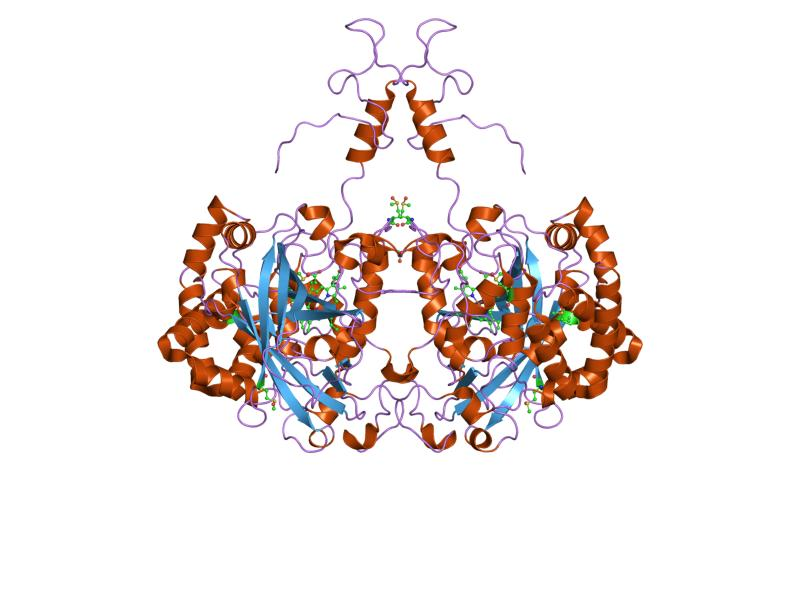
- helicobacter pylori catalase compound i

Identifiers
- Symbol: Catalase-rel
- Pfam: PF06628
- InterPro: IPR010582
- SCOP2: 1ggh / SCOPe / SUPFAM
Available protein structures:
- PDB: IPR010582 PF06628 (ECOD; PDBsum)
- AlphaFold: IPR010582; PF06628

In molecular biology, the catalase-related immune-responsive domain is a protein domain found in catalases. This domain carries the immune-responsive amphipathic octa-peptide that is recognised by T cells.
