= Abietadiene hydroxylase =

Class of enzymes

Abieta-7,13-diene hydroxylase

Identifiers
- EC no.: 1.14.13.108

Databases
- IntEnz: IntEnz view
- BRENDA: BRENDA entry
- ExPASy: NiceZyme view
- KEGG: KEGG entry
- MetaCyc: metabolic pathway
- PRIAM: profile
- PDB structures: RCSB PDB PDBe PDBsum
Search
- PMC: articles
- PubMed: articles
- NCBI: proteins

Abieta-7,13-diene hydroxylase (EC 1.14.13.108) is an enzyme with systematic name abieta-7,13-diene,NADPH:oxygen oxidoreductase (18-hydroxylating). This enzyme catalyses the following chemical reaction

abieta-7,13-diene + NADPH + H^{+} + O_{2} $\rightleftharpoons$ abieta-7,13-dien-18-ol + NADP^{+} + H_{2}O

Abietadiene hydroxylase is a heme-thiolate protein (P-450).
