= Nematode Her-1 =

Caenor_Her-1
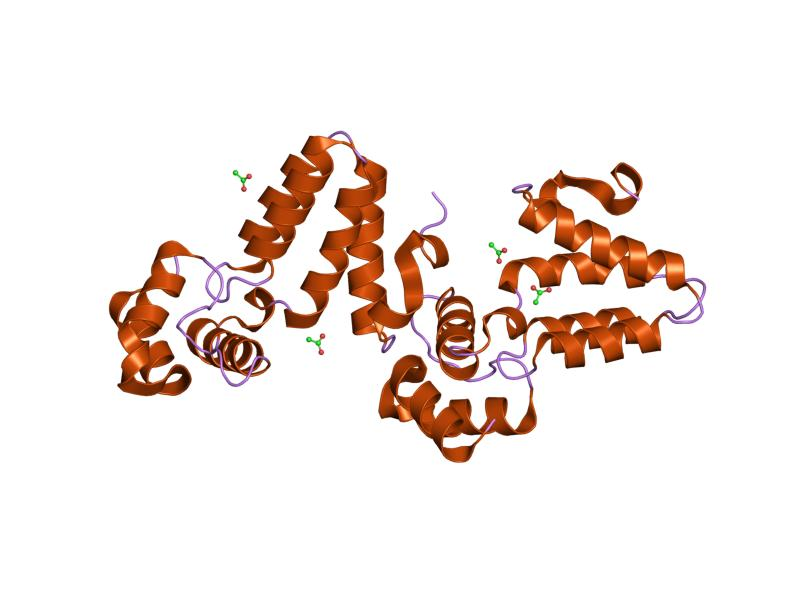
- crystal structure of c. elegans her-1

Identifiers
- Symbol: Caenor_Her-1
- Pfam: PF09232
- InterPro: IPR015313
- SCOP2: 1szh / SCOPe / SUPFAM
Available protein structures:
- PDB: IPR015313 PF09232 (ECOD; PDBsum)
- AlphaFold: IPR015313; PF09232

In molecular biology the nematode Her-1 protein is a protein which adopts an all-helical structure with two subdomains: amino acids 19-80 comprise a left-handed three-helix bundle with an overhand connection between the second and third helices, whilst amino acids 81-164 comprise a left-handed anti-parallel four-helix bundle in which the first helix consists of four consecutive turns of 3-10-helix. Fourteen cysteines are conserved in all known HER-1 sequences and form seven disulphide bonds. The protein dictates male development in Caenorhabditis elegans, probably by playing a direct role in cell signalling during C. elegans sex determination. It also inhibits the function of tra-2a.
