= Enterobacter ribonuclease =

Identifiers
- EC no.: 3.1.27.6
- CAS no.: 395640-99-0

Databases
- IntEnz: IntEnz view
- BRENDA: BRENDA entry
- ExPASy: NiceZyme view
- KEGG: KEGG entry
- MetaCyc: metabolic pathway
- PRIAM: profile
- PDB structures: RCSB PDB PDBe PDBsum
Search
- PMC: articles
- PubMed: articles
- NCBI: proteins

Enterobacter ribonuclease (EC 3.1.27.6) is an enzyme. This enzyme catalyses the following chemical reaction

Endonucleolytic cleavage to nucleoside 3'-phosphates and 3'-phosphooligonucleotides with 2',3'-cyclic phosphate intermediates

This enzyme has preference for cleavage at CpA.
