= 12beta-hydroxysteroid dehydrogenase =

Class of enzymes

12-beta-hydroxysteroid dehydrogenase

Identifiers
- EC no.: 1.1.1.238
- CAS no.: 118390-62-8

Databases
- IntEnz: IntEnz view
- BRENDA: BRENDA entry
- ExPASy: NiceZyme view
- KEGG: KEGG entry
- MetaCyc: metabolic pathway
- PRIAM: profile
- PDB structures: RCSB PDB PDBe PDBsum
- Gene Ontology: AmiGO / QuickGO
Search
- PMC: articles
- PubMed: articles
- NCBI: proteins

In enzymology, a 12beta-hydroxysteroid dehydrogenase (EC 1.1.1.238) is an enzyme that catalyzes the chemical reaction

3alpha,7alpha,12beta-trihydroxy-5beta-cholanate + NADP^{+} $\rightleftharpoons$ 3alpha,7alpha-dihydroxy-12-oxo-5beta-cholanate + NADPH + H^{+}

Thus, the two substrates of this enzyme are 3alpha,7alpha,12beta-trihydroxy-5beta-cholanate and NADP^{+}, whereas its 3 products are 3alpha,7alpha-dihydroxy-12-oxo-5beta-cholanate, NADPH, and H^{+}.

This enzyme belongs to the family of oxidoreductases, specifically those acting on the CH-OH group of donor with NAD^{+} or NADP^{+} as acceptor. The systematic name of this enzyme class is 12beta-hydroxysteroid:NADP^{+} 12-oxidoreductase. Other names in common use include 12beta-hydroxy steroid (nicotinamide adenine dinucleotide phosphate), and dehydrogenase.
