= Biomolecule Stretching Database =

BSDB

Content
- Description: biomolecule stretching database.

Contact
- Research center: Polish Academy of Sciences
- Laboratory: Institute of Physics
- Primary citation: PMID 20929872
- Release date: 2010

Access
- Website: jowisz.ifpan.edu.pl/BSDB/

The Biomolecule Stretching Database contains information about the mechanostability of proteins based on their resistance to stretching.
