= Zinc finger protein 577 =

Protein found in humans

ZNF577

Identifiers
- Aliases: ZNF577, zinc finger protein 577
- External IDs: GeneCards: ZNF577

Gene location (Human)
Chr.	Chromosome 19 (human)
Band	19q13.41	Start	51,804,816 bp
Band	19q13.41	End	51,890,950 bp
RNA expression pattern
Bgee	Human / Mouse (ortholog); Top expressed in: left testis; right testis; left ovary; Achilles tendon; right ovary; sural nerve; left lobe of thyroid gland; gonad; right lobe of thyroid gland; muscle layer of sigmoid colon / n/a; More reference expression data
BioGPS	n/a
Gene ontology
Molecular function	DNA-binding transcription factor activity; DNA binding; metal ion binding; nucleic acid binding; DNA-binding transcription factor activity, RNA polymerase II-specific
Cellular component	intracellular anatomical structure; nucleus
Biological process	transcription, DNA-templated; regulation of transcription, DNA-templated; regulation of transcription by RNA polymerase II
Sources:Amigo / QuickGO
Orthologs
Databases	NCBI: entry; OMA: entry
Species	Human	Mouse
Entrez	84765	n/a
Ensembl	ENSG00000161551	n/a
UniProt	Q9BSK1	n/a
RefSeq (mRNA)	NM_001135590; NM_032679	n/a
RefSeq (protein)	NP_001129062; NP_116068; NP_001357376; NP_001357377; NP_001357378 NP_001357379; NP_001357381; NP_001357384; NP_001357385; NP_001357386; NP_116068.2	n/a
Location (UCSC)	Chr 19: 51.8 – 51.89 Mb	n/a
PubMed search		n/a
- Wikidata
View/Edit Human

Zinc finger protein 577 is a protein that in humans is encoded by the ZNF577 gene.
