= Juglone 3-monooxygenase =

juglone 3-monooxygenase

Identifiers
- EC no.: 1.14.99.27
- CAS no.: 98865-54-4

Databases
- IntEnz: IntEnz view
- BRENDA: BRENDA entry
- ExPASy: NiceZyme view
- KEGG: KEGG entry
- MetaCyc: metabolic pathway
- PRIAM: profile
- PDB structures: RCSB PDB PDBe PDBsum
- Gene Ontology: AmiGO / QuickGO
Search
- PMC: articles
- PubMed: articles
- NCBI: proteins

In enzymology, juglone 3-monooxygenase (EC 1.14.99.27) is an enzyme that catalyzes the chemical reaction

5-hydroxy-1,4-naphthoquinone + AH_{2} + O_{2} $\rightleftharpoons$ 3,5-dihydroxy-1,4-naphthoquinone + A + H_{2}O

The 3 substrates of this enzyme are 5-hydroxy-1,4-naphthoquinone, AH_{2}, and O_{2}, whereas its 3 products are 3,5-dihydroxy-1,4-naphthoquinone, A, and H_{2}O.

This enzyme belongs to the family of oxidoreductases, specifically those acting on paired donors, with O_{2} as oxidant and incorporation or reduction of oxygen. The oxygen incorporated need not be derived from O miscellaneous. The systematic name of this enzyme class is 5-hydroxy-1,4-naphthoquinone,hydrogen-donor:oxygen oxidoreductase (3-hydroxylating). Other names in common use include juglone hydroxylase, naphthoquinone hydroxylase, and naphthoquinone-hydroxylase.
