= Galactosylgalactosylglucosylceramidase =

galactosylgalactosylglucosylceramidase

Identifiers
- EC no.: 3.2.1.47
- CAS no.: 9023-01-2

Databases
- IntEnz: IntEnz view
- BRENDA: BRENDA entry
- ExPASy: NiceZyme view
- KEGG: KEGG entry
- MetaCyc: metabolic pathway
- PRIAM: profile
- PDB structures: RCSB PDB PDBe PDBsum
- Gene Ontology: AmiGO / QuickGO
Search
- PMC: articles
- PubMed: articles
- NCBI: proteins

In enzymology, a galactosylgalactosylglucosylceramidase (EC 3.2.1.47) is an enzyme that catalyzes the chemical reaction

D-galactosyl-D-galactosyl-D-glucosyl-N-acylsphingosine + H_{2}O $\rightleftharpoons$ D-galactose + lactosyl-N-acylsphingosine

Thus, the two substrates of this enzyme are D-galactosyl-D-galactosyl-D-glucosyl-N-acylsphingosine and H_{2}O, whereas its two products are D-galactose and lactosyl-N-acylsphingosine.

This enzyme belongs to the family of hydrolases, specifically those glycosidases that hydrolyse O- and S-glycosyl compounds. The systematic name of this enzyme class is D-galactosyl-D-galactosyl-D-glucosyl-N-acylsphingosine galactohydrolase. Other names in common use include trihexosyl ceramide galactosidase, ceramide trihexosidase, ceramidetrihexoside alpha-galactosidase, trihexosylceramide alpha-galactosidase, and ceramidetrihexosidase.
