= Zinc finger protein 574 =

Protein found in humans

ZNF574

Identifiers
- Aliases: ZNF574, FP972, zinc finger protein 574
- External IDs: MGI: 2442951; GeneCards: ZNF574

Gene location (Human)
Chr.	Chromosome 19 (human)
Band	19q13.2	Start	42,068,477 bp
Band	19q13.2	End	42,081,552 bp

Gene location (Mouse)
Chr.	Chromosome 7 (mouse)
Band	7|7 A3	Start	24,771,992 bp
Band	7|7 A3	End	24,782,917 bp
RNA expression pattern
Bgee	Human / Mouse (ortholog); Top expressed in: cerebellar vermis; right testis; left testis; oocyte; vena cava; parotid gland; tendon of biceps brachii; lateral nuclear group of thalamus; nipple; body of tongue / Top expressed in: seminiferous tubule; Rostral migratory stream; primary oocyte; spermatocyte; motor neuron; spermatid; ciliary body; secondary oocyte; internal carotid artery; vas deferens; More reference expression data
BioGPS	n/a
Gene ontology
Molecular function	DNA binding; metal ion binding; nucleic acid binding; DNA-binding transcription factor activity, RNA polymerase II-specific
Cellular component	nucleus
Biological process	transcription, DNA-templated; regulation of transcription, DNA-templated; regulation of transcription by RNA polymerase II
Sources:Amigo / QuickGO
Orthologs
Databases	NCBI: entry; OMA: entry
Species	Human	Mouse
Entrez	64763	232976
Ensembl	ENSG00000105732	ENSMUSG00000045252
UniProt	Q6ZN55	Q8BY46
RefSeq (mRNA)	NM_022752; NM_001330519	NM_001168506; NM_175477
RefSeq (protein)	NP_001317448; NP_073589	NP_001161978; NP_780686
Location (UCSC)	Chr 19: 42.07 – 42.08 Mb	Chr 7: 24.77 – 24.78 Mb
PubMed search
- Wikidata
View/Edit Human	View/Edit Mouse

Zinc finger protein 574 is a protein that in humans is encoded by the ZNF574 gene. The protein is predicted to enable DNA-binding transcription activator activity, and to be involved with RNA polymerase II-specific and RNA polymerase II cis-regulator region sequence specific DNA binding.
