= 3alpha,7alpha,12alpha-trihydroxycholestan-26-al 26-oxidoreductase =

Enzyme

3-alpha,7-alpha,12-alpha-trihydroxycholestan-26-al 26-oxidoreductase

Identifiers
- EC no.: 1.2.1.40
- CAS no.: 62213-58-5

Databases
- IntEnz: IntEnz view
- BRENDA: BRENDA entry
- ExPASy: NiceZyme view
- KEGG: KEGG entry
- MetaCyc: metabolic pathway
- PRIAM: profile
- PDB structures: RCSB PDB PDBe PDBsum
- Gene Ontology: AmiGO / QuickGO
Search
- PMC: articles
- PubMed: articles
- NCBI: proteins

In enzymology, a 3alpha,7alpha,12alpha-trihydroxycholestan-26-al 26-oxidoreductase is an enzyme that catalyzes the chemical reaction:

(25R)-3alpha,7alpha,12alpha-trihydroxy-5beta-cholestan-26-al + NAD^{+} + H_{2}O $\rightleftharpoons$ (25R)-3alpha,7alpha,12alpha-trihydroxy-5beta-cholestan-26-oate + NADH + 2 H^{+}

The 3 substrates of this enzyme are (25R)-3alpha,7alpha,12alpha-trihydroxy-5beta-cholestan-26-al, NAD^{+}, and H_{2}O, whereas its 2 products are (25R)-3alpha,7alpha,12alpha-trihydroxy-5beta-cholestan-26-oate, NADH, and H^{+}. This enzyme participates in bile acid biosynthesis.

== Nomenclature ==
This enzyme belongs to the family of oxidoreductases, specifically those acting on the aldehyde or oxo group of donor with NAD+ or NADP+ as acceptor. The systematic name of this enzyme class is (25R)-3alpha,7alpha,12alpha-trihydroxy-5beta-cholestan-26-al:NAD+ 26-oxidoreductase. Other names in common use include:

- cholestanetriol-26-al 26-dehydrogenase,
- 3alpha,7alpha,12alpha-trihydroxy-5beta-cholestan-26-al, dehydrogenase,
- trihydroxydeoxycoprostanal dehydrogenase,
- THAL-NAD oxidoreductase,
- 3alpha,7alpha,12alpha-trihydroxy-5beta-cholestan-26-al:NAD+, and
- 26-oxidoreductase.
