= Isopiperitenol dehydrogenase =

Class of enzymes

isopiperitenol dehydrogenase

Identifiers
- EC no.: 1.1.1.223
- CAS no.: 96595-05-0

Databases
- IntEnz: IntEnz view
- BRENDA: BRENDA entry
- ExPASy: NiceZyme view
- KEGG: KEGG entry
- MetaCyc: metabolic pathway
- PRIAM: profile
- PDB structures: RCSB PDB PDBe PDBsum
- Gene Ontology: AmiGO / QuickGO
Search
- PMC: articles
- PubMed: articles
- NCBI: proteins

In enzymology, an isopiperitenol dehydrogenase (EC 1.1.1.223) is an enzyme that catalyzes the chemical reaction

(-)-trans-isopiperitenol + NAD^{+} $\rightleftharpoons$ (-)-isopiperitenone + NADH + H^{+}

Thus, the two substrates of this enzyme are (-)-trans-isopiperitenol and NAD^{+}, whereas its 3 products are (-)-isopiperitenone, NADH, and H^{+}.

This enzyme belongs to the family of oxidoreductases, specifically those acting on the CH-OH group of donor with NAD^{+} or NADP^{+} as acceptor. The systematic name of this enzyme class is (-)-trans-isopiperitenol:NAD^{+} oxidoreductase. This enzyme participates in monoterpenoid biosynthesis.
