= 3alpha,7alpha,12alpha-trihydroxy-5beta-cholestanoyl-CoA 24-hydroxylase =

Enzyme

Identifiers
- EC no.: 1.17.99.3

Databases
- IntEnz: IntEnz view
- BRENDA: BRENDA entry
- ExPASy: NiceZyme view
- KEGG: KEGG entry
- MetaCyc: metabolic pathway
- PRIAM: profile
- PDB structures: RCSB PDB PDBe PDBsum
Search
- PMC: articles
- PubMed: articles
- NCBI: proteins

In enzymology, a 3alpha,7alpha,12alpha-trihydroxy-5beta-cholestanoyl-CoA 24-hydroxylase (EC 1.17.99.3) is an enzyme that catalyzes the chemical reaction

(25R)-3alpha,7alpha,12alpha-trihydroxy-5beta-cholestan-26-oyl-CoA + H_{2}O + acceptor $\rightleftharpoons$ (24R,25R)-3alpha,7alpha,12alpha,24-tetrahydroxy-5beta-cholestan-26- oyl-CoA + reduced acceptor

The 3 substrates of this enzyme are (25R)-3alpha,7alpha,12alpha-trihydroxy-5beta-cholestan-26-oyl-CoA, H_{2}O, and acceptor, whereas its two products are (24R,25R)-3alpha,7alpha,12alpha,24-tetrahydroxy-5beta-cholestan-26-oyl-CoA, and reduced acceptor.

This enzyme belongs to the family of oxidoreductases, specifically those acting on CH or CH_{2} groups with other acceptors. The systematic name of this enzyme class is (25R)-3alpha,7alpha,12alpha-trihydroxy-5beta-cholestan-26-oyl-CoA:ac ceptor 24-oxidoreductase (24R-hydroxylating). Other names in common use include trihydroxycoprostanoyl-CoA oxidase, THC-CoA oxidase, THCA-CoA oxidase, 3alpha,7alpha,12alpha-trihydroxy-5beta-cholestanoyl-CoA oxidase, 3alpha,7alpha,12alpha-trihydroxy-5beta-cholestan-26-oate 24-hydroxylase. This enzyme participates in the ppar signaling pathway.
