= TRNA (guanine-N1-)-methyltransferase =

tRNA (guanine-N1-)-methyltransferase

Identifiers
- EC no.: 2.1.1.31
- CAS no.: 37256-99-8

Databases
- IntEnz: IntEnz view
- BRENDA: BRENDA entry
- ExPASy: NiceZyme view
- KEGG: KEGG entry
- MetaCyc: metabolic pathway
- PRIAM: profile
- PDB structures: RCSB PDB PDBe PDBsum
- Gene Ontology: AmiGO / QuickGO
Search
- PMC: articles
- PubMed: articles
- NCBI: proteins

In enzymology, a tRNA (guanine-N1-)-methyltransferase (EC 2.1.1.31) is an enzyme that catalyzes the chemical reaction

S-adenosyl-L-methionine + tRNA $\rightleftharpoons$ S-adenosyl-L-homocysteine + tRNA containing N_{1}-methylguanine

Thus, the two substrates of this enzyme are S-adenosyl methionine and tRNA, whereas its two products are S-adenosylhomocysteine and tRNA containing N1-methylguanine.

This enzyme belongs to the family of transferases, specifically those transferring one-carbon group methyltransferases. The systematic name of this enzyme class is S-adenosyl-L-methionine:tRNA (guanine-N1-)-methyltransferase. Other names in common use include transfer ribonucleate guanine 1-methyltransferase, tRNA guanine 1-methyltransferase, and S-adenosyl-L-methionine:tRNA (guanine-1-N-)-methyltransferase.

== Structural studies ==
As of late 2007, 6 structures have been solved for this class of enzymes, with PDB accession codes 1OY5, 1P9P, 1UAJ, 1UAK, 1UAL, and 1UAM.
