= Zinc finger protein 780B =

Protein found in humans

ZNF780B

Identifiers
- Aliases: ZNF780B, ZNF779, zinc finger protein 780B
- External IDs: MGI: 2444764; GeneCards: ZNF780B

Gene location (Human)
Chr.	Chromosome 19 (human)
Band	19q13.2	Start	40,028,260 bp
Band	19q13.2	End	40,056,231 bp

Gene location (Mouse)
Chr.	Chromosome 7 (mouse)
Band	7|7 A3	Start	27,959,135 bp
Band	7|7 A3	End	27,979,171 bp
RNA expression pattern
Bgee	Human / Mouse (ortholog); Top expressed in: corpus callosum; Achilles tendon; endometrium; tonsil; apex of heart; pituitary gland; bone marrow cell; sural nerve; ovary; left ovary / Top expressed in: tail of embryo; uterus; genital tubercle; mesencephalon; neural tube; ganglionic eminence; spermatid; ventricular zone; urethra; liver; More reference expression data
BioGPS	n/a
Gene ontology
Molecular function	DNA-binding transcription factor activity; DNA binding; metal ion binding; nucleic acid binding
Cellular component	intracellular anatomical structure; nucleus
Biological process	regulation of transcription, DNA-templated; transcription, DNA-templated
Sources:Amigo / QuickGO
Orthologs
Databases	NCBI: entry; OMA: entry
Species	Human	Mouse
Entrez	163131	338354
Ensembl	ENSG00000128000; ENSG00000281601	ENSMUSG00000063047
UniProt	Q9Y6R6	n/a
RefSeq (mRNA)	NM_001005851	NM_001081021
RefSeq (protein)	NP_001005851	n/a
Location (UCSC)	Chr 19: 40.03 – 40.06 Mb	Chr 7: 27.96 – 27.98 Mb
PubMed search
- Wikidata
View/Edit Human	View/Edit Mouse

Zinc finger protein 780B is a protein that in humans is encoded by the ZNF780B gene.
