= 3alpha-hydroxyglycyrrhetinate dehydrogenase =

Enzyme

3-alpha-hydroxyglycyrrhetinate dehydrogenase

Identifiers
- EC no.: 1.1.1.230
- CAS no.: 114308-07-5

Databases
- IntEnz: IntEnz view
- BRENDA: BRENDA entry
- ExPASy: NiceZyme view
- KEGG: KEGG entry
- MetaCyc: metabolic pathway
- PRIAM: profile
- PDB structures: RCSB PDB PDBe PDBsum
- Gene Ontology: AmiGO / QuickGO
Search
- PMC: articles
- PubMed: articles
- NCBI: proteins

In enzymology, a 3alpha-hydroxyglycyrrhetinate dehydrogenase (EC 1.1.1.230) is an enzyme that catalyzes the chemical reaction

3alpha-hydroxyglycyrrhetinate + NADP^{+} $\rightleftharpoons$ 3-oxoglycyrrhetinate + NADPH + H^{+}

Thus, the two substrates of this enzyme are 3alpha-hydroxyglycyrrhetinate and NADP^{+}, whereas its 3 products are 3-oxoglycyrrhetinate, NADPH, and H^{+}.

This enzyme belongs to the family of oxidoreductases, specifically those acting on the CH-OH group of donor with NAD^{+} or NADP^{+} as acceptor. The systematic name of this enzyme class is 3alpha-hydroxyglycyrrhetinate:NADP^{+} 3-oxidoreductase.
