= Vitamin B12-transporting ATPase =

cobalamin-transporting ATPase

Identifiers
- EC no.: 3.6.3.33

Databases
- IntEnz: IntEnz view
- BRENDA: BRENDA entry
- ExPASy: NiceZyme view
- KEGG: KEGG entry
- MetaCyc: metabolic pathway
- PRIAM: profile
- PDB structures: RCSB PDB PDBe PDBsum
- Gene Ontology: AmiGO / QuickGO
Search
- PMC: articles
- PubMed: articles
- NCBI: proteins

In enzymology, a vitamin B_{12}-transporting ATPase (EC 3.6.3.33) is an enzyme that catalyzes the chemical reaction

ATP + H_{2}O + vitamin B_{12out} $\rightleftharpoons$ ADP + phosphate + vitamin B_{12in}

The 3 substrates of this enzyme are ATP, H_{2}O, and vitamin B_{12}, whereas its 3 products are ADP, phosphate, and vitamin B_{12}.

This enzyme belongs to the family of hydrolases, specifically those acting on acid anhydrides to catalyse transmembrane movement of substances. The systematic name of this enzyme class is ATP phosphohydrolase (vitamin B_{12}-importing). This enzyme participates in abc transporters - general.

== Structural studies ==
As of late 2007, two structures have been solved for this class of enzymes, with PDB accession codes 1L7V and 2QI9.
