= Fructose 5-dehydrogenase =

fructose 5-dehydrogenase

Identifiers
- EC no.: 1.1.99.11
- CAS no.: 37250-85-4

Databases
- IntEnz: IntEnz view
- BRENDA: BRENDA entry
- ExPASy: NiceZyme view
- KEGG: KEGG entry
- MetaCyc: metabolic pathway
- PRIAM: profile
- PDB structures: RCSB PDB PDBe PDBsum
- Gene Ontology: AmiGO / QuickGO
Search
- PMC: articles
- PubMed: articles
- NCBI: proteins

In enzymology, a fructose 5-dehydrogenase (EC 1.1.99.11) is an enzyme that catalyzes the chemical reaction

D-fructose + acceptor $\rightleftharpoons$ 5-dehydro-D-fructose + reduced acceptor

Thus, the two substrates of this enzyme are D-fructose and acceptor, whereas its two products are 5-dehydro-D-fructose and reduced acceptor.

This enzyme belongs to the family of oxidoreductases, specifically those acting on the CH-OH group of donor with other acceptors. The systematic name of this enzyme class is D-fructose:acceptor 5-oxidoreductase. Other names in common use include fructose 5-dehydrogenase (acceptor), D-fructose dehydrogenase, and D-fructose:(acceptor) 5-oxidoreductase.
