= 3-oxoacyl-(acyl-carrier-protein) reductase (NADH) =

Class of enzymes

3-oxoacyl-[acyl-carrier-protein] reductase (NADH)

Identifiers
- EC no.: 1.1.1.212
- CAS no.: 82047-86-7

Databases
- IntEnz: IntEnz view
- BRENDA: BRENDA entry
- ExPASy: NiceZyme view
- KEGG: KEGG entry
- MetaCyc: metabolic pathway
- PRIAM: profile
- PDB structures: RCSB PDB PDBe PDBsum
- Gene Ontology: AmiGO / QuickGO
Search
- PMC: articles
- PubMed: articles
- NCBI: proteins

In enzymology, a 3-oxoacyl-[acyl-carrier-protein] reductase (NADH) (EC 1.1.1.212) is an enzyme that catalyzes the chemical reaction

(3R)-3-hydroxyacyl-[acyl-carrier-protein] + NAD^{+} $\rightleftharpoons$ 3-oxoacyl-[acyl-carrier-protein] + NADH + H^{+}

Thus, the two substrates of this enzyme are [[(3R)-3-hydroxyacyl-[acyl-carrier-protein]]] and NAD^{+}, whereas its 3 products are [[3-oxoacyl-[acyl-carrier-protein]]], NADH, and H^{+}.

This enzyme belongs to the family of oxidoreductases, specifically those acting on the CH-OH group of donor with NAD^{+} or NADP^{+} as acceptor. The systematic name of this enzyme class is (3R)-3-hydroxyacyl-[acyl-carrier-protein]:NAD^{+} oxidoreductase. Other names in common use include 3-oxoacyl-[acyl carrier protein] (reduced nicotinamide adenine, dinucleotide) reductase, and 3-oxoacyl-[acyl-carrier-protein] reductase (NADH).
