= Ribosomal-protein-alanine N-acetyltransferase =

ribosomal-protein-alanine N-acetyltransferase

Identifiers
- EC no.: 2.3.1.128
- CAS no.: 113383-52-1

Databases
- IntEnz: IntEnz view
- BRENDA: BRENDA entry
- ExPASy: NiceZyme view
- KEGG: KEGG entry
- MetaCyc: metabolic pathway
- PRIAM: profile
- PDB structures: RCSB PDB PDBe PDBsum
- Gene Ontology: AmiGO / QuickGO
Search
- PMC: articles
- PubMed: articles
- NCBI: proteins

In enzymology, a ribosomal-protein-alanine N-acetyltransferase (EC 2.3.1.128) is an enzyme that catalyzes the chemical reaction

acetyl-CoA + ribosomal-protein L-alanine $\rightleftharpoons$ CoA + ribosomal-protein N-acetyl-L-alanine

Thus, the two substrates of this enzyme are acetyl-CoA and ribosomal-protein L-alanine, whereas its two products are CoA and ribosomal-protein N-acetyl-L-alanine.

This enzyme belongs to the family of transferases, specifically those acyltransferases transferring groups other than aminoacyl groups. The systematic name of this enzyme class is acetyl-CoA:ribosomal-protein-L-alanine N-acetyltransferase. This enzyme is also called ribosomal protein S18 acetyltransferase.

== Structural studies ==
As of late 2007, 3 structures have been solved for this class of enzymes, with PDB accession codes 2CNM, 2CNS, and 2CNT.
