= Methylphenyltetrahydropyridine N-monooxygenase =

Identifiers
- EC no.: 1.13.12.11
- CAS no.: 37256-73-8

Databases
- IntEnz: IntEnz view
- BRENDA: BRENDA entry
- ExPASy: NiceZyme view
- KEGG: KEGG entry
- MetaCyc: metabolic pathway
- PRIAM: profile
- PDB structures: RCSB PDB PDBe PDBsum
Search
- PMC: articles
- PubMed: articles
- NCBI: proteins

Methylphenyltetrahydropyridine N-monooxygenase (EC 1.13.12.11) is an enzyme with systematic name 1-methyl-4-phenyl-1,2,3,6-tetrahydropyridine:oxygen N-oxidoreductase. This enzyme catalyses the following chemical reaction

1-methyl-4-phenyl-1,2,3,6-tetrahydropyridine + O_{2} $\rightleftharpoons$ 1-methyl-4-phenyl-1,2,3,6-tetrahydropyridine N-oxide + methanol

Methylphenyltetrahydropyridine N-monooxygenase is a flavoprotein.
