= Zinc finger protein 556 =

Protein found in humans

ZNF556

Identifiers
- Aliases: ZNF556, zinc finger protein 556
- External IDs: GeneCards: ZNF556

Gene location (Human)
Chr.	Chromosome 19 (human)
Band	19p13.3	Start	2,867,335 bp
Band	19p13.3	End	2,883,445 bp
RNA expression pattern
Bgee	Human / Mouse (ortholog); Top expressed in: secondary oocyte; Skeletal muscle tissue of biceps brachii; testicle; amniotic fluid; gonad; epithelium of esophagus; muscle of thigh; body of tongue; cerebellar vermis; endometrium / n/a; More reference expression data
BioGPS	n/a
Gene ontology
Molecular function	DNA binding; metal ion binding; nucleic acid binding; DNA-binding transcription factor activity, RNA polymerase II-specific
Cellular component	intracellular anatomical structure; nucleus
Biological process	regulation of transcription, DNA-templated; transcription, DNA-templated; regulation of transcription by RNA polymerase II
Sources:Amigo / QuickGO
Orthologs
Databases	NCBI: entry; OMA: entry
Species	Human	Mouse
Entrez	80032	n/a
Ensembl	ENSG00000172000	n/a
UniProt	Q9HAH1	n/a
RefSeq (mRNA)	NM_024967; NM_001300843	n/a
RefSeq (protein)	NP_001287772; NP_079243	n/a
Location (UCSC)	Chr 19: 2.87 – 2.88 Mb	n/a
PubMed search		n/a
- Wikidata
View/Edit Human

Zinc finger protein 556 is a protein that in humans is encoded by the ZNF556 gene.
