= Zinc finger protein 222 =

Protein found in humans

ZNF222

Identifiers
- Aliases: ZNF222, zinc finger protein 222
- External IDs: OMIM: 617357; GeneCards: ZNF222

Gene location (Human)
Chr.	Chromosome 19 (human)
Band	19q13.31	Start	44,025,342 bp
Band	19q13.31	End	44,033,110 bp
RNA expression pattern
Bgee	Human / Mouse (ortholog); Top expressed in: secondary oocyte; testicle; cerebellar hemisphere; right hemisphere of cerebellum; apex of heart; ganglionic eminence; islet of Langerhans; gonad; stromal cell of endometrium; granulocyte / n/a; More reference expression data
BioGPS	n/a
Gene ontology
Molecular function	DNA binding; metal ion binding; nucleic acid binding; DNA-binding transcription factor activity, RNA polymerase II-specific; DNA-binding transcription factor activity
Cellular component	intracellular anatomical structure; nucleus
Biological process	regulation of transcription, DNA-templated; transcription, DNA-templated; regulation of transcription by RNA polymerase II
Sources:Amigo / QuickGO
Orthologs
Databases	NCBI: entry; OMA: entry
Species	Human	Mouse
Entrez	7673	n/a
Ensembl	ENSG00000159885	n/a
UniProt	Q9UK12	n/a
RefSeq (mRNA)	NM_001129996; NM_013360	n/a
RefSeq (protein)	NP_001123468; NP_037492	n/a
Location (UCSC)	Chr 19: 44.03 – 44.03 Mb	n/a
PubMed search		n/a
- Wikidata
View/Edit Human

Zinc finger protein 222 is a protein that in humans is encoded by the ZNF222 gene.
