= Manganese-transporting ATPase =

Class of enzymes

manganese-transporting ATPase

Identifiers
- EC no.: 3.6.3.35

Databases
- IntEnz: IntEnz view
- BRENDA: BRENDA entry
- ExPASy: NiceZyme view
- KEGG: KEGG entry
- MetaCyc: metabolic pathway
- PRIAM: profile
- PDB structures: RCSB PDB PDBe PDBsum
- Gene Ontology: AmiGO / QuickGO
Search
- PMC: articles
- PubMed: articles
- NCBI: proteins

In enzymology, a manganese-transporting ATPase (EC 3.6.3.35) is an enzyme that catalyzes the chemical reaction

ATP + H_{2}O + Mn_{2}+out $\rightleftharpoons$ ADP + phosphate + Mn_{2}+in

The 3 substrates of this enzyme are ATP, H_{2}O, and Mn^{2+}, whereas its 3 products are ADP, phosphate, and Mn^{2+}.

This enzyme belongs to the family of hydrolases, specifically those acting on acid anhydrides to catalyse transmembrane movement of substances. The systematic name of this enzyme class is called ATP phosphohydrolase (manganese-importing). This enzyme is also known as ABC-type manganese permease complex.
