= Mir-188 microRNA precursor family =

mir-188

Identifiers
- Symbol: mir-188
- Rfam: RF01897
- miRBase family: 7

Other data
- RNA type: microRNA
- Domain(s): Eukaryota;
- PDB structures: PDBe

Expandable. We make separate entries for proteins, etc. Why not these?

In molecular biology mir-188 microRNA is a short RNA molecule. MicroRNAs function to regulate the expression levels of other genes by several mechanisms.

== See also ==
- MicroRNA
