= Benzyl-2-methyl-hydroxybutyrate dehydrogenase =

Enzyme

benzyl-2-methyl-hydroxybutyrate dehydrogenase

Identifiers
- EC no.: 1.1.1.217
- CAS no.: 99332-62-4

Databases
- IntEnz: IntEnz view
- BRENDA: BRENDA entry
- ExPASy: NiceZyme view
- KEGG: KEGG entry
- MetaCyc: metabolic pathway
- PRIAM: profile
- PDB structures: RCSB PDB PDBe PDBsum
- Gene Ontology: AmiGO / QuickGO
Search
- PMC: articles
- PubMed: articles
- NCBI: proteins

In enzymology, a benzyl-2-methyl-hydroxybutyrate dehydrogenase (EC 1.1.1.217) is an enzyme that catalyzes the chemical reaction

benzyl (2R,3S)-2-methyl-3-hydroxybutanoate + NADP^{+} $\rightleftharpoons$ benzyl 2-methyl-3-oxobutanoate + NADPH + H^{+}

Thus, the two substrates of this enzyme are benzyl (2R,3S)-2-methyl-3-hydroxybutanoate and NADP^{+}, whereas its 3 products are benzyl 2-methyl-3-oxobutanoate, NADPH, and H^{+}.

This enzyme belongs to the family of oxidoreductases, specifically those acting on the CH-OH group of donor with NAD^{+} or NADP^{+} as acceptor. The systematic name of this enzyme class is benzyl-(2R,3S)-2-methyl-3-hydroxybutanoate:NADP^{+} 3-oxidoreductase. This enzyme is also called benzyl 2-methyl-3-hydroxybutyrate dehydrogenase.
