= Drimenol cyclase =

Class of enzymes

Identifiers
- EC no.: 3.1.7.7
- CAS no.: 146838-17-7

Databases
- IntEnz: IntEnz view
- BRENDA: BRENDA entry
- ExPASy: NiceZyme view
- KEGG: KEGG entry
- MetaCyc: metabolic pathway
- PRIAM: profile
- PDB structures: RCSB PDB PDBe PDBsum
Search
- PMC: articles
- PubMed: articles
- NCBI: proteins

Drimenol cyclase (EC 3.1.7.7, farnesyl pyrophosphate:drimenol cyclase) is an enzyme with systematic name (2E,6E)-farnesyl-diphosphate diphosphohydrolase (drimenol-forming). This enzyme catalyses the following chemical reaction

(2E,6E)-farnesyl diphosphate + H_{2}O $\rightleftharpoons$ drimenol + diphosphate
