= 4933425L06Rik =

Mouse protein

RIKEN cDNA 4933425L06 is a protein that in the house mouse is encoded by the 4933425L06Rik gene.
