= Channel-conductance-controlling ATPase =

Class of enzymes

channel-conductance-controlling ATPase

Identifiers
- EC no.: 3.6.3.49

Databases
- IntEnz: IntEnz view
- BRENDA: BRENDA entry
- ExPASy: NiceZyme view
- KEGG: KEGG entry
- MetaCyc: metabolic pathway
- PRIAM: profile
- PDB structures: RCSB PDB PDBe PDBsum
- Gene Ontology: AmiGO / QuickGO
Search
- PMC: articles
- PubMed: articles
- NCBI: proteins

In enzymology, a channel-conductance-controlling ATPase (EC 3.6.3.49) is an enzyme that catalyzes the chemical reaction

ATP + H_{2}O $\rightleftharpoons$ ADP + phosphate

Thus, the two substrates of this enzyme are ATP and H_{2}O, whereas its two products are ADP and phosphate.

This enzyme belongs to the family of hydrolases, specifically those acting on acid anhydrides to catalyse transmembrane movement of substances. The systematic name of this enzyme class is ATP phosphohydrolase (channel-conductance-controlling).

== Structural studies ==
As of late 2007, two structures have been solved for this class of enzymes, with PDB accession codes 1XMI and 1XMJ.
