= Zinc finger protein 585B =

Protein found in humans

ZNF585B

Identifiers
- Aliases: ZNF585B, SZFP41, zinc finger protein 585B, Zfp27
- External IDs: MGI: 99174; GeneCards: ZNF585B

Gene location (Human)
Chr.	Chromosome 19 (human)
Band	19q13.12	Start	37,181,579 bp
Band	19q13.12	End	37,218,153 bp

Gene location (Mouse)
Chr.	Chromosome 7 (mouse)
Band	7|7 B1	Start	29,592,758 bp
Band	7|7 B1	End	29,605,997 bp
RNA expression pattern
Bgee	Human / Mouse (ortholog); Top expressed in: secondary oocyte; Achilles tendon; epithelium of colon; gonad; islet of Langerhans; testicle; right lobe of thyroid gland; cerebellar hemisphere; pituitary gland; left lobe of thyroid gland / Top expressed in: urethra; male urethra; genital tubercle; ventricular zone; zygote; lumbar subsegment of spinal cord; Rostral migratory stream; substantia nigra; tail of embryo; muscle layer of urethra; More reference expression data
BioGPS	n/a
Gene ontology
Molecular function	DNA-binding transcription factor activity; metal ion binding; nucleic acid binding; DNA binding
Cellular component	intracellular anatomical structure; nucleus
Biological process	regulation of transcription, DNA-templated; transcription, DNA-templated
Sources:Amigo / QuickGO
Orthologs
Databases	NCBI: entry; OMA: entry
Species	Human	Mouse
Entrez	92285	22689
Ensembl	ENSG00000245680	ENSMUSG00000062040
UniProt	Q52M93	P10077
RefSeq (mRNA)	NM_152279	NM_001037707; NM_001285797; NM_001285798; NM_011754
RefSeq (protein)	NP_689492	NP_001032796; NP_001272726; NP_001272727; NP_035884
Location (UCSC)	Chr 19: 37.18 – 37.22 Mb	Chr 7: 29.59 – 29.61 Mb
PubMed search
- Wikidata
View/Edit Human	View/Edit Mouse

Zinc finger protein 585B is a protein that in humans is encoded by the ZNF585B gene.
