= 2-dehydropantolactone reductase (B-specific) =

Class of enzymes

Identifiers
- EC no.: 1.1.1.214
- CAS no.: 37211-75-9

Databases
- IntEnz: IntEnz view
- BRENDA: BRENDA entry
- ExPASy: NiceZyme view
- KEGG: KEGG entry
- MetaCyc: metabolic pathway
- PRIAM: profile
- PDB structures: RCSB PDB PDBe PDBsum
- Gene Ontology: AmiGO / QuickGO
Search
- PMC: articles
- PubMed: articles
- NCBI: proteins

In enzymology, a 2-dehydropantolactone reductase (B-specific) (EC 1.1.1.214) is an enzyme that catalyzes the chemical reaction

(R)-pantolactone + NADP^{+} $\rightleftharpoons$ 2-dehydropantolactone + NADPH + H^{+}

Thus, the two substrates of this enzyme are (R)-pantolactone and NADP^{+}, whereas its 3 products are 2-dehydropantolactone, NADPH, and H^{+}.

This enzyme belongs to the family of oxidoreductases, specifically those acting on the CH-OH group of donor with NAD^{+} or NADP^{+} as acceptor. The systematic name of this enzyme class is (R)-pantolactone:NADP^{+} oxidoreductase (B-specific). Other names in common use include 2-oxopantoyl lactone reductase, 2-ketopantoyl lactone reductase, ketopantoyl lactone reductase, and 2-dehydropantoyl-lactone reductase (B-specific).
