= 4-Hydroxycyclohexanecarboxylate dehydrogenase =

Class of enzymes

4-hydroxycyclohexanecarboxylate dehydrogenase

Identifiers
- EC no.: 1.1.1.226
- CAS no.: 67272-36-0

Databases
- IntEnz: IntEnz view
- BRENDA: BRENDA entry
- ExPASy: NiceZyme view
- KEGG: KEGG entry
- MetaCyc: metabolic pathway
- PRIAM: profile
- PDB structures: RCSB PDB PDBe PDBsum
- Gene Ontology: AmiGO / QuickGO
Search
- PMC: articles
- PubMed: articles
- NCBI: proteins

In enzymology, a 4-hydroxycyclohexanecarboxylate dehydrogenase (EC 1.1.1.226) is an enzyme that catalyzes the chemical reaction

trans-4-hydroxycyclohexanecarboxylate + NAD^{+} $\rightleftharpoons$ 4-oxocyclohexanecarboxylate + NADH + H^{+}

Thus, the two substrates of this enzyme are trans-4-hydroxycyclohexanecarboxylate and NAD^{+}, whereas its 3 products are 4-oxocyclohexanecarboxylate, NADH, and H^{+}.

This enzyme belongs to the family of oxidoreductases, specifically those acting on the CH-OH group of donor with NAD^{+} or NADP^{+} as acceptor. The systematic name of this enzyme class is trans-4-hydroxycyclohexanecarboxylate:NAD^{+} 4-oxidoreductase. This enzyme is also called trans-4-hydroxycyclohexanecarboxylate dehydrogenase.
