= Undecaprenyl-phosphate 4-deoxy-4-formamido-L-arabinose transferase =

Class of enzymes

Identifiers
- EC no.: 2.7.8.30

Databases
- IntEnz: IntEnz view
- BRENDA: BRENDA entry
- ExPASy: NiceZyme view
- KEGG: KEGG entry
- MetaCyc: metabolic pathway
- PRIAM: profile
- PDB structures: RCSB PDB PDBe PDBsum
Search
- PMC: articles
- PubMed: articles
- NCBI: proteins

Undecaprenyl-phosphate 4-deoxy-4-formamido-L-arabinose transferase (EC 2.7.8.30, undecaprenyl-phosphate Ara4FN transferase, Ara4FN transferase, polymyxin resistance protein PmrF, UDP-4-amino-4-deoxy-alpha-L-arabinose:ditrans,polycis-undecaprenyl phosphate 4-amino-4-deoxy-alpha-L-arabinosyltransferase) is an enzyme with systematic name UDP-4-amino-4-deoxy-alpha-L-arabinose:ditrans,octacis-undecaprenyl phosphate 4-amino-4-deoxy-alpha-L-arabinosyltransferase. This enzyme catalyses the following chemical reaction

UDP-4-deoxy-4-formamido-beta-L-arabinopyranose + ditrans, octacis-undecaprenyl phosphate $\rightleftharpoons$ UDP + 4-deoxy-4-formamido-alpha-L-arabinopyranosyl ditrans, octacis-undecaprenyl phosphate

The enzyme shows no activity with UDP-4-amino-4-deoxy-beta-L-arabinose.
