= Zinc finger protein 780A =

Protein found in humans

ZNF780A

Identifiers
- Aliases: ZNF780A, ZNF780, zinc finger protein 780A
- External IDs: MGI: 2148237; GeneCards: ZNF780A

Gene location (Human)
Chr.	Chromosome 19 (human)
Band	19q13.2	Start	40,069,152 bp
Band	19q13.2	End	40,090,943 bp

Gene location (Mouse)
Chr.	Chromosome 7 (mouse)
Band	7|7 A3	Start	27,689,340 bp
Band	7|7 A3	End	27,706,484 bp
RNA expression pattern
Bgee	Human / Mouse (ortholog); Top expressed in: monocyte; Achilles tendon; body of pancreas; corpus callosum; right lobe of liver; tonsil; granulocyte; blood; islet of Langerhans; lymph node / Top expressed in: urethra; substantia nigra; male urethra; spermatid; Rostral migratory stream; ventricular zone; spermatocyte; lumbar subsegment of spinal cord; dentate gyrus of hippocampal formation granule cell; medial ganglionic eminence; More reference expression data
BioGPS	n/a
Gene ontology
Molecular function	DNA binding; DNA-binding transcription factor activity; metal ion binding; nucleic acid binding
Cellular component	nucleus; intracellular anatomical structure
Biological process	transcription, DNA-templated; regulation of transcription, DNA-templated
Sources:Amigo / QuickGO
Orthologs
Databases	NCBI: entry; OMA: entry
Species	Human	Mouse
Entrez	284323	112415
Ensembl	ENSG00000197782; ENSG00000280568	ENSMUSG00000057093
UniProt	O75290; Q05CQ7	n/a
RefSeq (mRNA)	NM_001010880; NM_001142577; NM_001142578; NM_001142579	NM_001112731; NM_198417
RefSeq (protein)	NP_001010880; NP_001136049; NP_001136050; NP_001136051; NP_001136049.1 NP_001136050.1	n/a
Location (UCSC)	Chr 19: 40.07 – 40.09 Mb	Chr 7: 27.69 – 27.71 Mb
PubMed search
- Wikidata
View/Edit Human	View/Edit Mouse

Zinc finger protein 780A is a protein that in humans is encoded by the ZNF780A gene.
