= Zinc finger protein 230 =

Protein found in humans

ZNF230

Identifiers
- Aliases: ZNF230, FDZF2, zinc finger protein 230
- External IDs: GeneCards: ZNF230

Gene location (Human)
Chr.	Chromosome 19 (human)
Band	19q13.31	Start	44,002,957 bp
Band	19q13.31	End	44,013,924 bp
RNA expression pattern
Bgee	Human / Mouse (ortholog); Top expressed in: blood; secondary oocyte; testicle; granulocyte; Achilles tendon; stromal cell of endometrium; ganglionic eminence; monocyte; ventricular zone; left ovary / n/a; More reference expression data
BioGPS	n/a
Gene ontology
Molecular function	DNA binding; protein binding; metal ion binding; nucleic acid binding; DNA-binding transcription factor activity, RNA polymerase II-specific; DNA-binding transcription factor activity
Cellular component	intracellular anatomical structure; nucleus
Biological process	regulation of transcription, DNA-templated; transcription, DNA-templated; regulation of transcription by RNA polymerase II
Sources:Amigo / QuickGO
Orthologs
Databases	NCBI: entry; OMA: entry
Species	Human	Mouse
Entrez	7773	n/a
Ensembl	ENSG00000159882	n/a
UniProt	Q9UIE0	n/a
RefSeq (mRNA)	NM_006300	n/a
RefSeq (protein)	NP_006291	n/a
Location (UCSC)	Chr 19: 44 – 44.01 Mb	n/a
PubMed search		n/a
- Wikidata
View/Edit Human

Zinc finger protein 230 is a protein that in humans is encoded by the ZNF230 gene.
