= 4932414N04Rik =

Mouse protein

RIKEN cDNA 4932414N04 is a protein that in the house mouse is encoded by the 4932414N04Rik gene. The gene is also known as RP23-459M13.1.
