= 3-Ketosteroid 9alpha-monooxygenase =

Class of enzymes

3-ketosteroid 9alpha-monooxygenase

Identifiers
- EC no.: 1.14.13.142

Databases
- IntEnz: IntEnz view
- BRENDA: BRENDA entry
- ExPASy: NiceZyme view
- KEGG: KEGG entry
- MetaCyc: metabolic pathway
- PRIAM: profile
- PDB structures: RCSB PDB PDBe PDBsum
Search
- PMC: articles
- PubMed: articles
- NCBI: proteins

3-ketosteroid 9alpha-monooxygenase (EC 1.14.13.142, KshAB, 3-ketosteroid 9alpha-hydroxylase) is an enzyme with systematic name androsta-1,4-diene-3,17-dione,NADH:oxygen oxidoreductase (9alpha-hydroxylating). This enzyme catalyses the following chemical reaction

androsta-1,4-diene-3,17-dione + NADH + H^{+} + O_{2} $\rightleftharpoons$ 9alpha-hydroxyandrosta-1,4-diene-3,17-dione + NAD^{+} + H_{2}O

3-Ketosteroid 9alpha-monooxygenase is involved in the cholesterol degradation in several bacterial pathogens.
