= Zinc finger protein 846 =

Protein found in humans

ZNF846

Identifiers
- Aliases: ZNF846, zinc finger protein 846
- External IDs: MGI: 1924012; GeneCards: ZNF846

Gene location (Human)
Chr.	Chromosome 19 (human)
Band	19p13.2	Start	9,751,993 bp
Band	19p13.2	End	9,793,180 bp

Gene location (Mouse)
Chr.	Chromosome 9 (mouse)
Band	9|9 A3	Start	20,492,587 bp
Band	9|9 A3	End	20,516,705 bp
RNA expression pattern
Bgee	Human / Mouse (ortholog); Top expressed in: left testis; right testis; sperm; Descending thoracic aorta; left uterine tube; right coronary artery; right ovary; smooth muscle tissue; Achilles tendon; ascending aorta / Top expressed in: hand; zygote; medial ganglionic eminence; tail of embryo; genital tubercle; secondary oocyte; neural tube; spermatocyte; ventricular zone; female urethra; More reference expression data
BioGPS	n/a
Gene ontology
Molecular function	DNA binding; protein binding; metal ion binding; nucleic acid binding; DNA-binding transcription factor activity, RNA polymerase II-specific
Cellular component	intracellular anatomical structure; nucleus
Biological process	regulation of transcription, DNA-templated; transcription, DNA-templated; regulation of transcription by RNA polymerase II
Sources:Amigo / QuickGO
Orthologs
Databases	NCBI: entry; OMA: entry
Species	Human	Mouse
Entrez	162993	244721
Ensembl	ENSG00000196605	ENSMUSG00000058192
UniProt	Q147U1	n/a
RefSeq (mRNA)	NM_001077624; NM_001353798; NM_001353799; NM_001353800	NM_172919
RefSeq (protein)	NP_001071092; NP_001340727; NP_001340728; NP_001340729	n/a
Location (UCSC)	Chr 19: 9.75 – 9.79 Mb	Chr 9: 20.49 – 20.52 Mb
PubMed search
- Wikidata
View/Edit Human	View/Edit Mouse

Zinc finger protein 846 is a protein that in humans is encoded by the ZNF846 gene.
