= HLA-Y =

Protein in humans

Major histocompatibility complex, class I, Y (pseudogene) is a protein that in humans is encoded by the HLA-Y gene.
