= Zinc finger protein 414 =

Protein found in humans

ZNF414

Identifiers
- Aliases: ZNF414, ZFP414, zinc finger protein 414
- External IDs: MGI: 1915641; GeneCards: ZNF414

Gene location (Human)
Chr.	Chromosome 19 (human)
Band	19p13.2	Start	8,509,678 bp
Band	19p13.2	End	8,514,167 bp

Gene location (Mouse)
Chr.	Chromosome 17 (mouse)
Band	17|17 B1	Start	33,848,064 bp
Band	17|17 B1	End	33,850,753 bp
RNA expression pattern
Bgee	Human / Mouse (ortholog); Top expressed in: granulocyte; right lobe of thyroid gland; left lobe of thyroid gland; body of uterus; anterior pituitary; apex of heart; left ovary; ectocervix; canal of the cervix; right hemisphere of cerebellum / Top expressed in: granulocyte; neural layer of retina; gastrula; tail of embryo; hand; ventricular zone; genital tubercle; internal carotid artery; neural tube; yolk sac; More reference expression data
BioGPS	n/a
Gene ontology
Molecular function	DNA binding; protein binding; metal ion binding; nucleic acid binding; DNA-binding transcription factor activity, RNA polymerase II-specific
Cellular component	nucleus
Biological process	regulation of transcription, DNA-templated; transcription, DNA-templated; regulation of transcription by RNA polymerase II
Sources:Amigo / QuickGO
Orthologs
Databases	NCBI: entry; OMA: entry
Species	Human	Mouse
Entrez	84330	328801
Ensembl	ENSG00000133250	ENSMUSG00000073423
UniProt	Q96IQ9	Q9DCK4
RefSeq (mRNA)	NM_032370; NM_001146175	NM_026712
RefSeq (protein)	NP_001139647; NP_115746	NP_080988
Location (UCSC)	Chr 19: 8.51 – 8.51 Mb	Chr 17: 33.85 – 33.85 Mb
PubMed search
- Wikidata
View/Edit Human	View/Edit Mouse

Zinc finger protein 414 is a protein that in humans is encoded by the ZNF414 gene.
