= Long intergenic non-protein coding RNA 1157 =

Non-coding RNA in the species Homo sapiens

LINC01157

Identifiers
- Aliases: LINC01157, linc-Enc1, long intergenic non-protein coding RNA 1157
- External IDs: OMIM: 618214; GeneCards: LINC01157
Orthologs
Databases	NCBI: entry
Species	Human	Mouse
Entrez	105379037	n/a
Ensembl	n/a	n/a
UniProt	n a	n/a
RefSeq (mRNA)	n/a	n/a
RefSeq (protein)	n/a	n/a
Location (UCSC)	n/a	n/a
PubMed search		n/a
- Wikidata
View/Edit Human

Long intergenic non-protein coding RNA 1157 is a protein that in humans is encoded by the LINC01157 gene.
