= Chromosome 19 =

Human chromosome

- Human chromosome 19 pair after G-banding. One is from mother, one is from father.

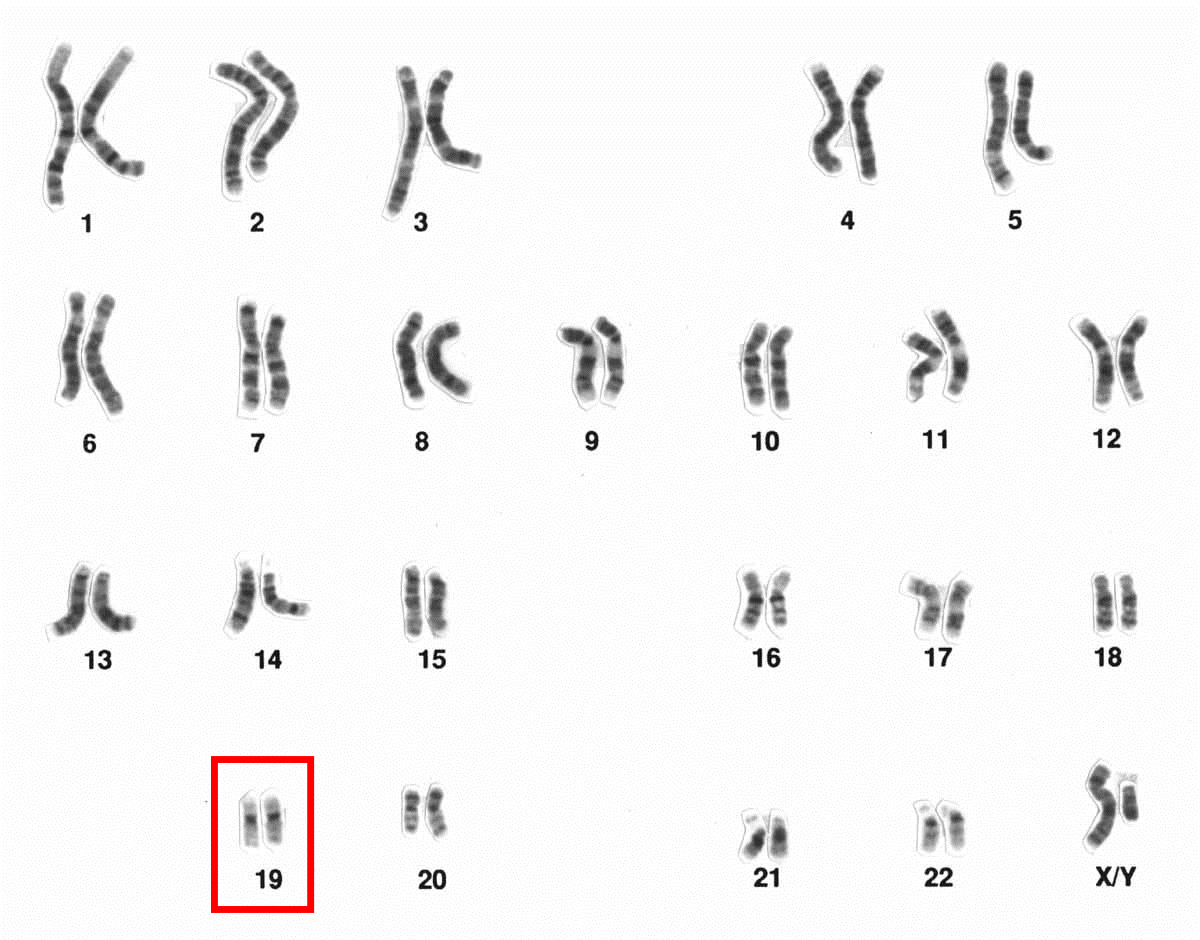
- Chromosome 19 pair in human male karyogram.

Features
- Length (bp): 61,707,364 bp (CHM13)
- No. of genes: 1,357 (CCDS)
- Type: Autosome
- Centromere position: Metacentric (26.2 Mbp)

Complete gene lists
- CCDS: Gene list
- HGNC: Gene list
- UniProt: Gene list
- NCBI: Gene list

External map viewers
- Ensembl: Chromosome 19
- Entrez: Chromosome 19
- NCBI: Chromosome 19
- UCSC: Chromosome 19

Full DNA sequences
- RefSeq: NC_000019 (FASTA)
- GenBank: CM000681 (FASTA)

Chromosome 19 is one of the 23 pairs of chromosomes in humans. People normally have two copies of this chromosome. Chromosome 19 spans more than 61.7 million base pairs, the building material of DNA. It is considered the most gene-rich chromosome containing roughly 1,500 genes, despite accounting for only 2 percent of the human genome.

== Genes ==
=== Number of genes ===
The following are some of the gene count estimates of human chromosome 19. Because researchers use different approaches to genome annotation, their predictions of the number of genes on each chromosome varies (for technical details, see gene prediction). Among various projects, the collaborative consensus coding sequence project (CCDS) takes an extremely conservative strategy. So CCDS's gene number prediction represents a lower bound on the total number of human protein-coding genes.

Estimated by	Protein-coding genes	Non-coding RNA genes	Pseudogenes	Source	Release date
CCDS	1,357	—	—		2016-09-08
HGNC	1,372	299	413		2017-05-12
Ensembl	1,469	894	514		2017-03-29
UniProt	1,435	—	—		2018-02-28
NCBI	1,430	604	528		2017-05-19

=== Gene list ===
The following is a partial list of genes on human chromosome 19. For a complete list, see the link in the infobox on the right.

- A1BG: encoding protein Alpha-1-B glycoprotein
- AAVS1, viral integration site
- ACSBG2: encoding enzyme Long-chain-fatty-acid—CoA ligase
- ANKRD24: encoding protein Ankyrin repeat domain-containing protein 24
- ARMC6: encoding protein Armadillo repeat-containing protein 6
- ATG4D: encoding protein Autophagy related 4D, cysteine peptidase
- ATP5SL: encoding protein ATP synthase subunit s-like protein
- ATPase ASNA1: encoding enzyme ATPase ASNA1 also known as arsenical pump-driving ATPase and arsenite-stimulated ATPase
- BTBD14B: encoding protein Nucleus accumbens-associated protein 1
- C19orf18: encoding protein Chromosome 19 open reading frame 18
- C19orf44: encoding protein Chromosome 19 open reading frame 44
- C19orf70: encoding protein Chromosome 19 open reading frame 70
- CACTIN: encoding protein Cactin
- CCDC130: encoding protein Coiled-coil domain containing 130
- CCDC151: encoding protein Coiled-coil domain containing 151
- CCDC8: encoding protein Coiled-coil domain containing 8
- CCDC94: encoding protein Coiled-coil domain containing 94 (CCDC94),
- CXB3S: encoding protein Coxsackie virus B3 sensitivity
- DHX34: encoding protein Dexh-box helicase 34
- DNASE2: encoding protein Deoxyribonuclease II, lysosomal
- DPF1: encoding protein D4, zinc and double PHD fingers family 1
- EID2
- ETV2: encoding protein Ets variant 2
- FIZ1: encoding protein FLT3 interacting zinc finger 1
- HCST: encoding protein Hematopoietic cell signal transducer
- HRC: encoding protein Sarcoplasmic reticulum histidine-rich calcium-binding protein
- IFI30: encoding enzyme Gamma-interferon-inducible lysosomal thiol reductase
- IGFL3: encoding protein IGF like family member 3
- KRTDAP: encoding protein Keratinocyte differentiation-associated protein
- LENG9: encoding protein Leukocyte Receptor Cluster Member 9 (LENG 9)
- LIM2: encoding protein Lens fiber membrane intrinsic protein
- LRG1: encoding protein Leucine-rich alpha-2-glycoprotein 1
- LRRC25: encoding protein Leucine rich repeat containing 25
- LSM4: encoding protein U6 snRNA-associated Sm-like protein LSm4
- LSR: encoding protein Lipolysis-stimulated lipoprotein receptor
- LYPD5: encoding protein LY6/PLAUR domain containing 5
- MBOAT7: encoding enzyme Lysophospholipid acyltransferase 7
- MOBKL2A: encoding enzyme Mps one binder kinase activator-like 2A
- MZF1-AS1: encoding protein MZF1 antisense RNA 1
- NCLN: encoding protein Nicalin
- NFKBID: encoding protein Nuclear factor of kappa light polypeptide gene enhancer in B-cells inhibitor
- NOSIP: encoding enzyme Nitric oxide synthase-interacting protein
- NWD1: NACHT and WD repeat domain containing 1.
- OLFM2: encoding protein Olfactomedin 2
- OSCAR: encoding protein Osteoclast-associated immunoglobulin-like receptor
- PALM: encoding protein Paralemmin
- PDCD5: encoding protein Programmed cell death protein 5
- PEX11G: peroxisomal biogenesis factor 11 gamma
- PGK1P2: encoding Phosphoglycerate kinase 1, pseudogene 2 protein
- PLIN4: encoding protein Perilipin 4
- PLVAP: encoding protein Plasmalemma vesicle-associated protein
- PRR12: encoding protein Proline-rich 12
- PRR36 (Proline Rich Region 36): encoding protein PRP36 (Proline Rich Protein 36)
- KLK3: The Prostate-specific antigen (PSA)
- PRX: Periaxin
- PTOV1: encoding protein Prostate tumor overexpressed gene 1 protein
- RFPL4A: encoding protein Ret finger protein like 4a
- SBNO2: encoding protein Strawberry notch homolog 2 (Drosophila)
- SEPW1: encoding protein Selenoprotein W
- SFRS14: encoding protein Putative splicing factor, arginine/serine-rich 14
- SFRS16: encoding protein Splicing factor, arginine/serine-rich 16
- SLC5A5: Solute carrier family 5 (sodium iodide symporter), member 5
- STK11: Serine/threonine kinase 11 (Peutz-Jeghers syndrome)
- TBCB: encoding protein Tubulin-folding cofactor B
- TECR: encoding enzyme Trans-2,3-enoyl-CoA reductase
- THOP1: encoding enzyme Thimet oligopeptidase
- TIMM50: encoding enzyme Mitochondrial import inner membrane translocase subunit TIM50
- TIP39: encoding protein Tuberoinfundibular peptide of 39 residues
- TMED1: encoding protein Transmembrane emp24 domain-containing protein 1
- TMEM160: encoding protein Transmembrane protein 160
- TMEM205: encoding protein Transmembrane Protein 205
- UBXN6: encoding protein UBX domain protein 6
- UCA1: a long non-coding RNA Urothelial cancer associated 1
- UPK1A: encoding protein Uroplakin-1a
- USE1: encoding protein Uncharacterized hematopoietic stem/progenitor cells protein MDS032
- ZFP82: encoding protein ZFP82 zinc finger protein
- ZSCAN4: Zinc finger and scan domain containing 4
- ZSCAN18: encoding protein Zinc finger and SCAN domain containing 18
- ZNF112: encoding protein Zinc finger protein 112
- ZNF134: encoding protein Zinc finger protein 134
- ZNF160: encoding protein Zinc finger protein 160
- ZNF180: encoding protein Zinc finger protein 180
- ZNF208: encoding protein Zinc finger protein 208
- ZNF224: encoding protein Zinc finger protein 224
- ZNF225: encoding protein Zinc finger protein 225
- ZNF226: encoding protein Zinc finger protein 226
- ZNF229: encoding protein Zinc finger protein 229
- ZNF257: encoding protein Zinc finger protein 257
- ZNF264: encoding protein Zinc finger protein 264
- ZNF266: encoding protein Zinc finger protein 266
- ZNF274: encoding protein Zinc finger protein 274
- ZNF320: encoding protein Zinc finger protein 320
- ZNF331: encoding protein Zinc finger protein 331
- ZNF347: encoding protein Zinc finger protein 347
- ZNF426: encoding protein Zinc finger protein 426
- ZNF444: encoding protein Zinc finger protein 444
- ZNF665: encoding protein Zinc finger protein 665
- ZNF473: encoding protein Zinc finger protein 473
- ZNF506: encoding protein Zinc finger protein 506
- ZNF507: encoding protein Zinc finger protein 507
- ZNF536: encoding protein Zinc finger protein 536
- ZNF541: encoding protein Zinc finger protein 541
- ZNF557: encoding protein Zinc finger protein 557
- ZNF571: encoding protein Zinc finger protein 571
- ZNF576: encoding protein Zinc finger protein 576
- Zinc finger protein 613: encoding protein Zinc finger protein 613
- ZNF649: Transcriptional suppressor
- ZNF71: encoding protein Endothelial zinc finger protein induced by tumor necrosis factor alpha
- ZNF737: encoding protein Zinc finger protein 737
- ZNF749: encoding protein Zinc finger protein 749
- ZNF676: encoding protein Zinc finger protein 676
- ZNF772: encoding protein Zinc finger protein 772
- ZNF784: encoding protein Zinc finger protein 784
- ZNF8: encoding protein Zinc finger protein 8
- ZNF83: encoding protein Zinc finger protein 83
- ZNF878: encoding protein Zinc finger protein 878
- ZNF880: encoding protein Zinc finger protein 880

==== Short arm ====
- CACNA1A: Calcium channel, voltage-dependent, P/Q type, alpha 1A subunit (Familial hemiplegic migraine Type I). Gene map locus 19p13
- COMP: Cartilage oligomeric matrix protein. Gene map locus 19p13.1
- NOTCH3: Notch homolog 3 (Drosophila): Gene map locus 19p13.1-p13.2
- GCDH: Glutaryl-Coenzyme A dehydrogenase. Gene map locus 19p13.2
- ZNF121: Zinc finger protein 121. Gene map locus 19p13.2
- BSG: Basigin (Ok blood group)/Extracellular matrix metalloproteinase inducer/CD147. Gene map locus 19p13.3
- ICAM4: Landsteiner and Weiner glycoprotein. Gene map locus 19p13.3
- NRTN: Neurturin, associated with Hirschsprung's disease: Gene locus map 19p13.3
- GTPBP3: GTP binding protein 3 19p13.11
- KLF2: Krüppel-like factor 2, also known as Lung Krüppel-like factor. Gene map locus 19p13.11 OMIM: 602016
- FAM32A: family with sequence similarity 32 member A 19q13.11
- DDX39: DExD-box helicase 39. Gene map locus 19p13.12

==== Long arm ====
- GAPDHS: glyceraldehyde-3-phosphate dehydrogenase, spermatogenic 19q13.12
- HAMP: Hepcidin antimicrobial peptide. Gene map locus 19q13.12
- BCKDHA: Branched chain keto acid dehydrogenase E1, alpha polypeptide (maple syrup urine disease). Gene map location 19q13.1-q13.2
- APOE: Apolipoprotein E, gene associated with Alzheimer's disease. Gene map locus 19q13.2
- CIC: Capicua transcriptional repressor. Gene map locus 19q13.2
- FCGBP: Fc fragment of IgG binding protein
- SARS2: seryl-tRNA synthetase 2, mitochondrial. Gene map locus 19q13.2
- ATP1A3: ATPase. Gene map locus 19q13.31
- DMWD: DM1 locus, WD repeat containing. Gene map locus 19q13.32
- PNMA8A: paraneoplastic Ma antigen family member 8A 19q13.32
- DMPK: Dystrophia myotonica-protein kinase. Gene map locus 19q13.32
- GLTSCR2: Glioma tumor suppressor candidate region gene 2 protein 19q13.33
- A1BG: Plasma glycoprotein, unknown function. Gene map locus 19q13.43
- LRC: The Leukocyte Receptor Complex is a family of immunoreceptors expressed predominantly on monocytes and B cells and at lower levels on dendritic cells and natural killer (NK) cells. The LRC also includes the KIR locus. Gene map locus 19q13.4 OMIM: 604812
- KPTN: Kaptin (actin binding protein) at the tips of stereocilia. Gene map locus 19q13.4
- FUT1: The H locus is located on chromosome 19 at 19q13.3. It contains three exons that span more than 5 kb of genomic DNA, and it encodes a fucosyltransferase that produces the H antigen on RBCs.
- FUT2: The Se locus is located on chromosome 19 at 19q13.3. It contains two exons that span about 25 kb of genomic DNA. The Se locus encodes a specific fucosyltransferase that is expressed in the epithelia of secretory tissues, such as salivary glands, the gastrointestinal tract, and the respiratory tract. The enzyme it encodes catalyzes the production of H antigen.
- MORT (Mortal Obligate RNA Transcript, lincRNA): Gene map locus 19q13.43

== Diseases and disorders ==
The following diseases are some of those related to genes on chromosome 19:

- Alternating hemiplegia of childhood
- Alzheimer's disease
- CADASIL
- Centronuclear myopathy autosomal dominant form
- Charcot–Marie–Tooth disease
- Congenital hearing loss
- Congenital hypothyroidism
- Donohue syndrome
- Familial hemiplegic migraine
- Glutaric acidemia type 1
- Hemochromatosis
- HUPRA syndrome
- Leber congenital amaurosis
- Maple syrup urine disease
- Multiple epiphyseal dysplasia
- Myotonic dystrophy
- Myotubular myopathy autosomal dominant form
- Oligodendroglioma
- Peutz–Jeghers syndrome
- Prolidase deficiency
- Pseudoachondroplasia
- Spinocerebellar ataxia type 6
- X-linked agammaglobulinemia or Bruton's disease

== Cytogenetic band ==
G-banding ideograms of human chromosome 19

G-banding ideogram of human chromosome 19 in resolution 850 bphs. Band length in this diagram is proportional to base-pair length. This type of ideogram is generally used in genome browsers (e.g. Ensembl, UCSC Genome Browser).

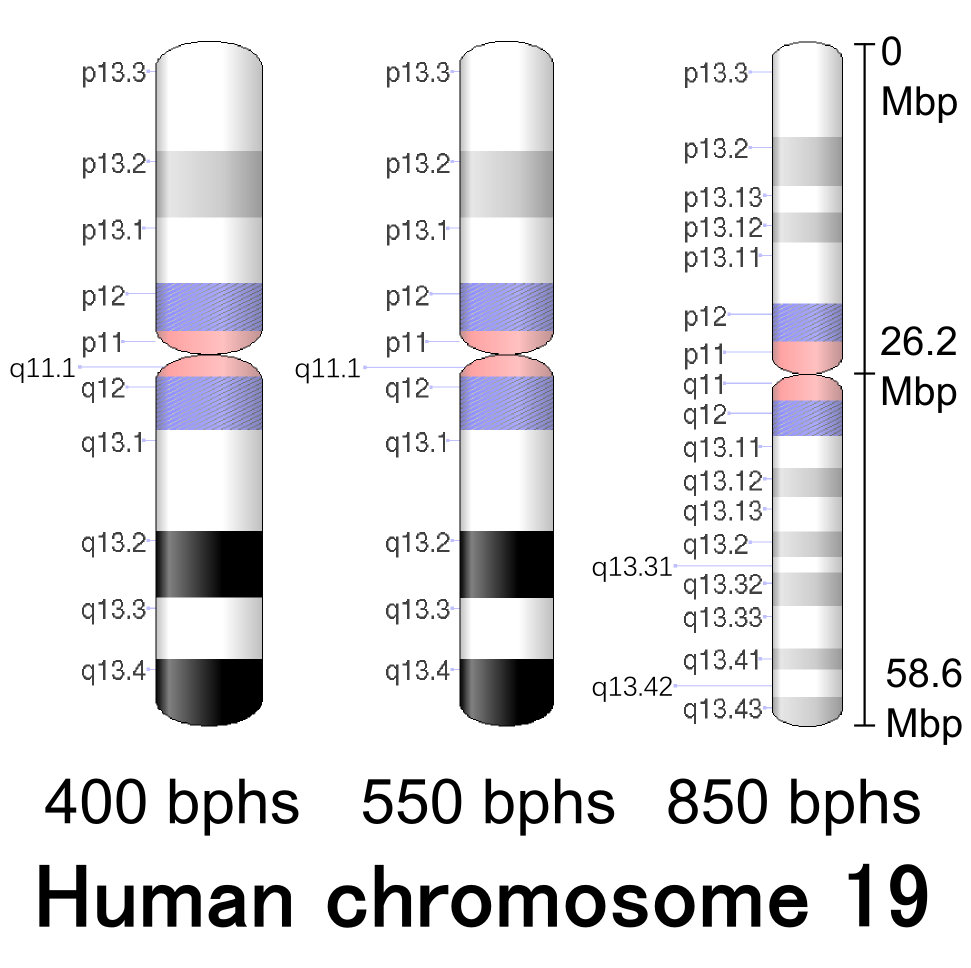
G-banding patterns of human chromosome 19 in three different resolutions (400, 550 and 850). Band length in this diagram is based on the ideograms from ISCN (2013). This type of ideogram represents actual relative band length observed under a microscope at the different moments during the mitotic process.

G-bands of human chromosome 19 in resolution 850 bphs
Chr.	Arm	Band	ISCN start	ISCN stop	Basepair start	Basepair stop	Stain	Density
19	p	13.3	0	578	1	6,900,000	gneg	
19	p	13.2	578	870	6,900,001	12,600,000	gpos	25
19	p	13.13	870	1034	12,600,001	13,800,000	gneg	
19	p	13.12	1034	1216	13,800,001	16,100,000	gpos	25
19	p	13.11	1216	1581	16,100,001	19,900,000	gneg	
19	p	12	1581	1809	19,900,001	24,200,000	gvar	
19	p	11	1809	1992	24,200,001	26,200,000	acen	
19	q	11	1992	2159	26,200,001	28,100,000	acen	
19	q	12	2159	2372	28,100,001	31,900,000	gvar	
19	q	13.11	2372	2569	31,900,001	35,100,000	gneg	
19	q	13.12	2569	2737	35,100,001	37,800,000	gpos	25
19	q	13.13	2737	2949	37,800,001	38,200,000	gneg	
19	q	13.2	2949	3101	38,200,001	42,900,000	gpos	25
19	q	13.31	3101	3193	42,900,001	44,700,000	gneg	
19	q	13.32	3193	3390	44,700,001	47,500,000	gpos	25
19	q	13.33	3390	3649	47,500,001	50,900,000	gneg	
19	q	13.41	3649	3770	50,900,001	53,100,000	gpos	25
19	q	13.42	3770	3938	53,100,001	55,800,000	gneg	
19	q	13.43	3938	4120	55,800,001	58,617,616	gpos	25
