= KRTDAP =

Protein-coding gene in the species Homo sapiens

Identifiers
- Aliases: KRTDAP, KDAP, UNQ467, keratinocyte differentiation associated protein
- External IDs: OMIM: 617212; MGI: 1928282; GeneCards: KRTDAP

Gene location (Human)
Chr.	Chromosome 19 (human)
Band	19q13.12	Start	35,487,324 bp
Band	19q13.12	End	35,495,558 bp

Gene location (Mouse)
Chr.	Chromosome 7 (mouse)
Band	7|7 B1	Start	30,787,896 bp
Band	7|7 B1	End	30,791,097 bp
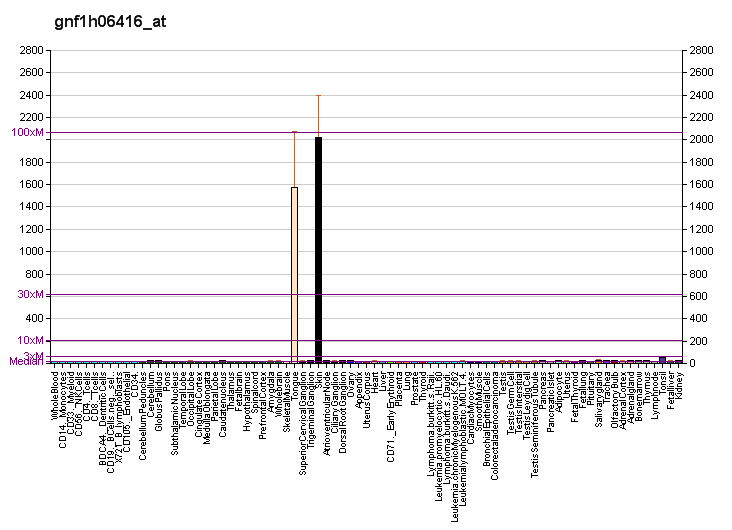
RNA expression pattern
Bgee	Human / Mouse (ortholog); Top expressed in: human penis; skin of thigh; vulva; skin of arm; nipple; skin of hip; gingival epithelium; skin of abdomen; body of tongue; oral cavity / Top expressed in: skin of external ear; esophagus; lip; superior surface of tongue; skin of abdomen; skin of back; umbilical cord; gastrula; condyle; human fetus; More reference expression data
BioGPS	More reference expression data
Gene ontology
Molecular function	molecular function
Cellular component	extracellular region; extracellular space; lamellar granule
Biological process	cell differentiation; biological process; epidermis development
Sources:Amigo / QuickGO
Orthologs
Databases	NCBI: entry; OMA: entry
Species	Human	Mouse
Entrez	388533	64661
Ensembl	ENSG00000188508	ENSMUSG00000074199
UniProt	P60985	Q3V2T4
RefSeq (mRNA)	NM_207392; NM_001244847	NM_001033131
RefSeq (protein)	NP_001231776; NP_997275	NP_001028303; NP_001350938; NP_001350939; NP_001350940
Location (UCSC)	Chr 19: 35.49 – 35.5 Mb	Chr 7: 30.79 – 30.79 Mb
PubMed search
- Wikidata
View/Edit Human	View/Edit Mouse

Keratinocyte differentiation-associated protein is a protein that in humans is encoded by the KRTDAP gene.
