= MOB kinase activator 3A =

Protein found in humans

MOB3A

Identifiers
- Aliases: MOB3A, MOB1C, MOBKL2A, moblak, MOB kinase activator 3A, MOB-LAK
- External IDs: MGI: 3050117; GeneCards: MOB3A

Gene location (Human)
Chr.	Chromosome 19 (human)
Band	19p13.3	Start	2,071,036 bp
Band	19p13.3	End	2,096,673 bp

Gene location (Mouse)
Chr.	Chromosome 10 (mouse)
Band	10|10 C1	Start	80,521,087 bp
Band	10|10 C1	End	80,537,811 bp
RNA expression pattern
Bgee	Human / Mouse (ortholog); Top expressed in: blood; white blood cell; monocyte; granulocyte; bone marrow cell; lymph node; appendix; spleen; mucosa of ileum; thymus / Top expressed in: granulocyte; blood; thymus; mesenteric lymph nodes; superior cervical ganglion; neural tube; yolk sac; spleen; internal carotid artery; bone marrow; More reference expression data
BioGPS	n/a
Orthologs
Databases	NCBI: entry; OMA: entry
Species	Human	Mouse
Entrez	126308	208228
Ensembl	ENSG00000172081	ENSMUSG00000003348
UniProt	Q96BX8	Q8BSU7
RefSeq (mRNA)	NM_130807	NM_172457
RefSeq (protein)	NP_570719	NP_766045
Location (UCSC)	Chr 19: 2.07 – 2.1 Mb	Chr 10: 80.52 – 80.54 Mb
PubMed search
- Wikidata
View/Edit Human	View/Edit Mouse

MOB kinase activator 3A is an protein that in humans is encoded by the MOB3A gene (previously MOBKL2A). Not much has been reported about the function of this gene, but it may be involved in the regulation of kinase activity.
