= ZNF264 =

Protein-coding gene in the species Homo sapiens

Identifiers
- Aliases: ZNF264, zinc finger protein 264
- External IDs: OMIM: 604668; GeneCards: ZNF264

Gene location (Human)
Chr.	Chromosome 19 (human)
Band	19q13.43	Start	57,191,500 bp
Band	19q13.43	End	57,222,846 bp
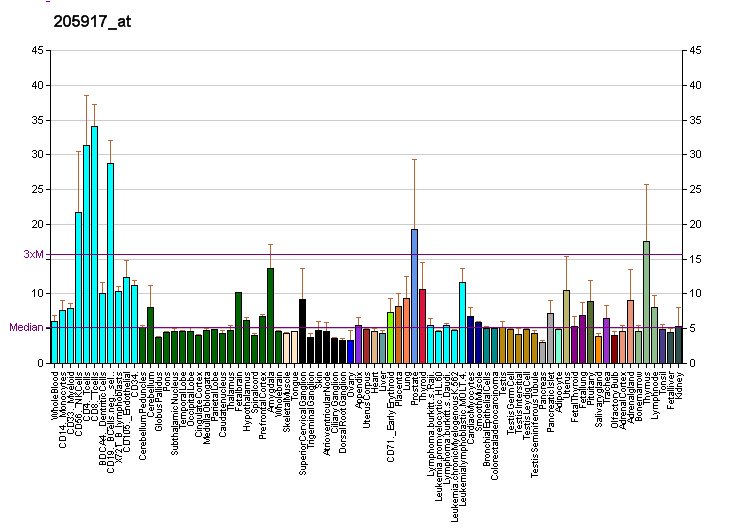
RNA expression pattern
Bgee	Human / Mouse (ortholog); Top expressed in: buccal mucosa cell; nipple; caput epididymis; bronchial epithelial cell; visceral pleura; parietal pleura; corpus epididymis; Achilles tendon; sural nerve; tail of epididymis / n/a; More reference expression data
BioGPS	More reference expression data
Gene ontology
Molecular function	DNA binding; metal ion binding; nucleic acid binding; DNA-binding transcription factor activity, RNA polymerase II-specific
Cellular component	intracellular anatomical structure; nucleus
Biological process	transcription, DNA-templated; regulation of transcription, DNA-templated; regulation of transcription by RNA polymerase II
Sources:Amigo / QuickGO
Orthologs
Databases	NCBI: entry; OMA: entry
Species	Human	Mouse
Entrez	9422	n/a
Ensembl	ENSG00000083844	n/a
UniProt	O43296	n/a
RefSeq (mRNA)	NM_003417	n/a
RefSeq (protein)	NP_003408	n/a
Location (UCSC)	Chr 19: 57.19 – 57.22 Mb	n/a
PubMed search		n/a
- Wikidata
View/Edit Human

Zinc finger protein 264 is a protein that in humans is encoded by the ZNF264 gene.
