= TMEM160 =

Protein-coding gene in the species Homo sapiens

Identifiers
- Aliases: TMEM160, transmembrane protein 160
- External IDs: MGI: 1916344; HomoloGene: 9881; GeneCards: TMEM160; OMA:TMEM160 - orthologs

Gene location (Human)
Chr.	Chromosome 19 (human)
Band	19q13.32	Start	47,045,909 bp
Band	19q13.32	End	47,048,624 bp

Gene location (Mouse)
Chr.	Chromosome 7 (mouse)
Band	7|7 A2	Start	16,186,704 bp
Band	7|7 A2	End	16,189,419 bp
RNA expression pattern
Bgee	Human / Mouse (ortholog); Top expressed in: amygdala; Brodmann area 9; anterior cingulate cortex; prefrontal cortex; granulocyte; right frontal lobe; olfactory zone of nasal mucosa; monocyte; muscle of thigh; apex of heart / Top expressed in: choroid plexus of fourth ventricle; motor neuron; perirhinal cortex; right kidney; CA3 field; facial motor nucleus; entorhinal cortex; ankle joint; endothelial cell of lymphatic vessel; embryo; More reference expression data
BioGPS	n/a
Orthologs
Species	Human	Mouse
Entrez	54958	69094
Ensembl	ENSG00000130748	ENSMUSG00000019158
UniProt	Q9NX00	Q9D938
RefSeq (mRNA)	NM_017854	NM_026938
RefSeq (protein)	NP_060324	NP_081214
Location (UCSC)	Chr 19: 47.05 – 47.05 Mb	Chr 7: 16.19 – 16.19 Mb
PubMed search
- Wikidata
View/Edit Human	View/Edit Mouse

Transmembrane protein 160 is a protein that in humans is encoded by the TMEM160 gene.
