= FCGBP =

Protein-coding gene in the species Homo sapiens

Identifiers
- Aliases: FCGBP, FC(GAMMA)BP, Fc fragment of IgG binding protein, Fc gamma binding protein
- External IDs: OMIM: 617553; MGI: 2444336; HomoloGene: 68369; GeneCards: FCGBP; OMA:FCGBP - orthologs

Gene location (Human)
Chr.	Chromosome 19 (human)
Band	19q13.2	Start	39,863,323 bp
Band	19q13.2	End	39,934,626 bp

Gene location (Mouse)
Chr.	Chromosome 7 (mouse)
Band	7|7 A3	Start	27,770,661 bp
Band	7|7 A3	End	27,820,287 bp
RNA expression pattern
Bgee	Human / Mouse (ortholog); Top expressed in: mucosa of transverse colon; right lobe of thyroid gland; duodenum; left lobe of thyroid gland; gallbladder; rectum; epithelium of colon; appendix; minor salivary glands; Descending thoracic aorta / Top expressed in: colon; jejunum; duodenum; ileum; zone of skin; thymus; primary oocyte; secondary oocyte; lip; zygote; More reference expression data
BioGPS	n/a
Orthologs
Species	Human	Mouse
Entrez	8857	215384
Ensembl	ENSG00000281123; ENSG00000275395	ENSMUSG00000047730
UniProt	Q9Y6R7	n/a
RefSeq (mRNA)	NM_003890	NM_001122603; NM_175444
RefSeq (protein)	NP_003881	n/a
Location (UCSC)	Chr 19: 39.86 – 39.93 Mb	Chr 7: 27.77 – 27.82 Mb
PubMed search
- Wikidata
View/Edit Human	View/Edit Mouse

IgGFc-binding protein is a protein that in humans is encoded by the FCGBP gene.
