= ZNF83 =

Protein-coding gene in the species Homo sapiens

Identifiers
- Aliases: ZNF83, HPF1, ZNF816B, zinc finger protein 83
- External IDs: OMIM: 194558; GeneCards: ZNF83

Gene location (Human)
Chr.	Chromosome 19 (human)
Band	19q13.41	Start	52,594,060 bp
Band	19q13.41	End	52,690,504 bp
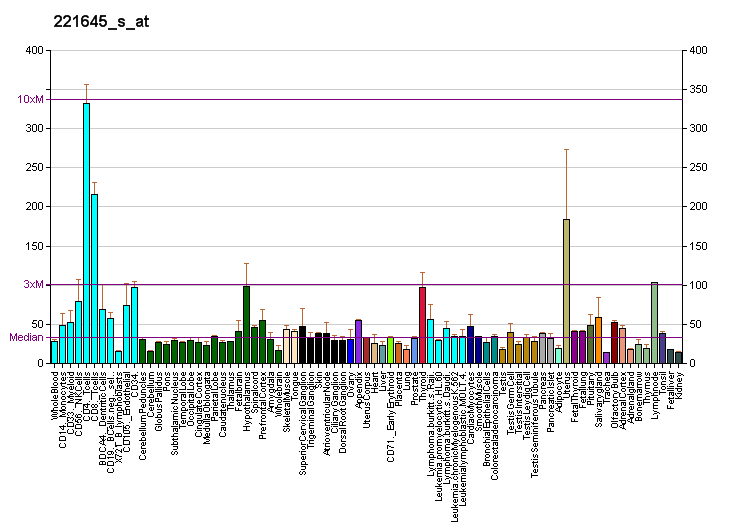

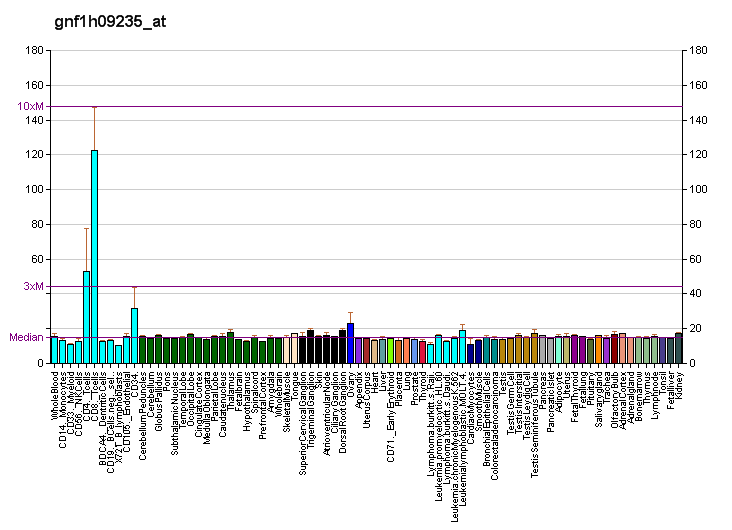
RNA expression pattern
Bgee	Human / Mouse (ortholog); Top expressed in: right uterine tube; left ovary; cerebellar hemisphere; right hemisphere of cerebellum; canal of the cervix; right ovary; anterior pituitary; tibial nerve; body of uterus; left lobe of thyroid gland / n/a; More reference expression data
BioGPS	More reference expression data
Gene ontology
Molecular function	DNA-binding transcription factor activity; DNA binding; protein binding; metal ion binding; nucleic acid binding; DNA-binding transcription factor activity, RNA polymerase II-specific
Cellular component	nucleus; intracellular anatomical structure
Biological process	regulation of transcription, DNA-templated; transcription, DNA-templated; regulation of transcription by RNA polymerase II
Sources:Amigo / QuickGO
Orthologs
Databases	NCBI: entry; OMA: entry
Species	Human	Mouse
Entrez	55769	n/a
Ensembl	ENSG00000167766	n/a
UniProt	P51522	n/a
RefSeq (mRNA)	NM_001105549; NM_001105550; NM_001105551; NM_001105552; NM_001105553 NM_001105554; NM_001242531; NM_001242538; NM_001277945; NM_001277946; NM_001277947; NM_001277948; NM_001277949; NM_001277951; NM_001277952; NM_018300; NM_001348015; NM_001348016; NM_001348017; NM_001348018; NM_001348019	n/a
RefSeq (protein)	NP_001099019; NP_001099020; NP_001099021; NP_001099022; NP_001264874 NP_001264875; NP_001264876; NP_001264877; NP_001264878; NP_001264880; NP_001264881; NP_060770; NP_001334944; NP_001334945; NP_001334946; NP_001334947; NP_001334948	n/a
Location (UCSC)	Chr 19: 52.59 – 52.69 Mb	n/a
PubMed search		n/a
- Wikidata
View/Edit Human

Zinc finger protein 83 is a protein that in humans is encoded by the ZNF83 gene.
