= UBXN6 =

Protein-coding gene in the species Homo sapiens

Identifiers
- Aliases: UBXN6, UBXD1, UBXDC2, UBX domain protein 6
- External IDs: OMIM: 611946; MGI: 1913780; GeneCards: UBXN6

Gene location (Human)
Chr.	Chromosome 19 (human)
Band	19p13.3	Start	4,444,999 bp
Band	19p13.3	End	4,457,794 bp

Gene location (Mouse)
Chr.	Chromosome 17 (mouse)
Band	17|17 D	Start	56,374,045 bp
Band	17|17 D	End	56,382,028 bp
RNA expression pattern
Bgee	Human / Mouse (ortholog); Top expressed in: right testis; left testis; left adrenal cortex; right adrenal gland; right adrenal cortex; anterior pituitary; right frontal lobe; blood; right hemisphere of cerebellum; right lobe of thyroid gland / Top expressed in: superior surface of tongue; seminiferous tubule; gallbladder; spermatid; spermatocyte; muscle of thigh; Ileal epithelium; superior frontal gyrus; dentate gyrus of hippocampal formation granule cell; lip; More reference expression data
BioGPS	n/a
Gene ontology
Molecular function	protein binding
Cellular component	extracellular exosome; cytoskeleton; nucleus; microtubule organizing center; cytoplasm; extrinsic component of membrane; lysosome; lysosomal membrane; endosome; cytosol; membrane; early endosome membrane; late endosome membrane; protein-containing complex
Biological process	macroautophagy; endosome to lysosome transport via multivesicular body sorting pathway; ERAD pathway
Sources:Amigo / QuickGO
Orthologs
Databases	NCBI: entry; OMA: entry
Species	Human	Mouse
Entrez	80700	66530
Ensembl	ENSG00000167671	ENSMUSG00000019578
UniProt	Q9BZV1	Q99PL6
RefSeq (mRNA)	NM_001171091; NM_025241	NM_024432; NM_001379361; NM_001379362
RefSeq (protein)	NP_001164562; NP_079517	NP_077752; NP_001366290; NP_001366291
Location (UCSC)	Chr 19: 4.44 – 4.46 Mb	Chr 17: 56.37 – 56.38 Mb
PubMed search
- Wikidata
View/Edit Human	View/Edit Mouse

UBX domain protein 6 is a protein in humans that is encoded by the UBXN6 gene.
