= Zinc finger protein 880 =

Protein found in humans

ZNF880

Identifiers
- Aliases: ZNF880, zinc finger protein 880
- External IDs: GeneCards: ZNF880

Gene location (Human)
Chr.	Chromosome 19 (human)
Band	19q13.41	Start	52,369,917 bp
Band	19q13.41	End	52,385,795 bp
RNA expression pattern
Bgee	Human / Mouse (ortholog); Top expressed in: buccal mucosa cell; Achilles tendon; testicle; olfactory zone of nasal mucosa; tendon of biceps brachii; sural nerve; apex of heart; islet of Langerhans; left ovary; ganglionic eminence / n/a; More reference expression data
BioGPS	n/a
Gene ontology
Molecular function	DNA-binding transcription factor activity; metal ion binding; nucleic acid binding; DNA-binding transcription factor activity, RNA polymerase II-specific
Cellular component	intracellular anatomical structure; nucleus
Biological process	regulation of transcription, DNA-templated; regulation of transcription by RNA polymerase II
Sources:Amigo / QuickGO
Orthologs
Databases	NCBI: entry; OMA: entry
Species	Human	Mouse
Entrez	400713	n/a
Ensembl	ENSG00000221923	n/a
UniProt	Q6PDB4	n/a
RefSeq (mRNA)	NM_001145434	n/a
RefSeq (protein)	NP_001138906	n/a
Location (UCSC)	Chr 19: 52.37 – 52.39 Mb	n/a
PubMed search		n/a
- Wikidata
View/Edit Human

Zinc finger protein 880 is a protein that in humans is encoded by the ZNF880 gene.
