= IGF like family member 3 =

Protein-coding gene in the species Homo sapiens

IGFL3

Identifiers
- Aliases: IGFL3, UNQ483, IGF like family member 3
- External IDs: OMIM: 610546; MGI: 2685426; HomoloGene: 74410; GeneCards: IGFL3; OMA:IGFL3 - orthologs

Gene location (Human)
Chr.	Chromosome 19 (human)
Band	19q13.32	Start	46,120,067 bp
Band	19q13.32	End	46,124,688 bp

Gene location (Mouse)
Chr.	Chromosome 7 (mouse)
Band	7|7 A2	Start	17,910,419 bp
Band	7|7 A2	End	17,915,787 bp
RNA expression pattern
Bgee	Human / Mouse (ortholog); Top expressed in: skin of leg; skin of abdomen; testicle; gonad; corpus callosum; sural nerve; smooth muscle tissue; mucosa of transverse colon; duodenum; right lung / Top expressed in: zone of skin; lens; lip; More reference expression data
BioGPS	n/a
Gene ontology
Molecular function	signaling receptor binding
Cellular component	extracellular region; extracellular space
Biological process	biological process
Sources:Amigo / QuickGO
Orthologs
Species	Human	Mouse
Entrez	388555	232925
Ensembl	ENSG00000188624	ENSMUSG00000066756
UniProt	Q6UXB1	Q6B9Z0
RefSeq (mRNA)	NM_207393	NM_001003393
RefSeq (protein)	NP_997276	NP_001003393
Location (UCSC)	Chr 19: 46.12 – 46.12 Mb	Chr 7: 17.91 – 17.92 Mb
PubMed search
- Wikidata
View/Edit Human	View/Edit Mouse

IGF like family member 3 is a protein that in humans is encoded by the IGFL3 gene.

== Function ==
IGFL3 belongs to the insulin-like growth factor (IGF; see MIM 147440) family of signaling molecules that play critical roles in cellular energy metabolism and in growth and development, especially prenatal growth (Emtage et al., 2006 [PubMed 16890402]).
