= Zinc finger and scan domain containing 18 =

Protein-coding gene in the species Homo sapiens

ZSCAN18

Identifiers
- Aliases: ZSCAN18, ZNF447, Zinc finger and scan domain containing 18
- External IDs: MGI: 3643810; GeneCards: ZSCAN18

Gene location (Human)
Chr.	Chromosome 19 (human)
Band	19q13.43	Start	58,083,838 bp
Band	19q13.43	End	58,118,427 bp

Gene location (Mouse)
Chr.	Chromosome 7 (mouse)
Band	7 A1|7	Start	12,768,090 bp
Band	7 A1|7	End	12,803,635 bp
RNA expression pattern
Bgee	Human / Mouse (ortholog); Top expressed in: right uterine tube; pituitary gland; anterior pituitary; nucleus accumbens; postcentral gyrus; hypothalamus; right frontal lobe; right lobe of thyroid gland; left lobe of thyroid gland; caudate nucleus / Top expressed in: dorsomedial hypothalamic nucleus; paraventricular nucleus of hypothalamus; arcuate nucleus; ventromedial nucleus; hand; spermatocyte; nucleus of stria terminalis; Gonadal ridge; spermatid; nucleus accumbens; More reference expression data
BioGPS	n/a
Gene ontology
Molecular function	DNA-binding transcription factor activity; DNA-binding transcription factor activity, RNA polymerase II-specific; DNA binding; metal ion binding; nucleic acid binding
Cellular component	nucleus
Biological process	regulation of transcription, DNA-templated; transcription, DNA-templated; regulation of transcription by RNA polymerase II
Sources:Amigo / QuickGO
Orthologs
Databases	NCBI: entry; OMA: entry
Species	Human	Mouse
Entrez	65982	232875
Ensembl	ENSG00000121413	ENSMUSG00000070822
UniProt	Q8TBC5	n/a
RefSeq (mRNA)	NM_001145542; NM_001145543; NM_001145544; NM_023926	NM_001017955; NM_001382523; NM_001382524
RefSeq (protein)	NP_001139014; NP_001139015; NP_001139016; NP_076415	n/a
Location (UCSC)	Chr 19: 58.08 – 58.12 Mb	Chr 7: 12.77 – 12.8 Mb
PubMed search
- Wikidata
View/Edit Human	View/Edit Mouse

Zinc finger and SCAN domain containing 18 is a protein that in humans is encoded by the ZSCAN18 gene.
