= NCLN =

Protein-coding gene in the species Homo sapiens

Identifiers
- Aliases: NCLN, NET59, nicalin
- External IDs: OMIM: 609156; MGI: 1926081; GeneCards: NCLN

Gene location (Human)
Chr.	Chromosome 19 (human)
Band	19p13.3	Start	3,185,563 bp
Band	19p13.3	End	3,209,575 bp

Gene location (Mouse)
Chr.	Chromosome 10 (mouse)
Band	10|10 C1	Start	81,322,083 bp
Band	10|10 C1	End	81,332,226 bp
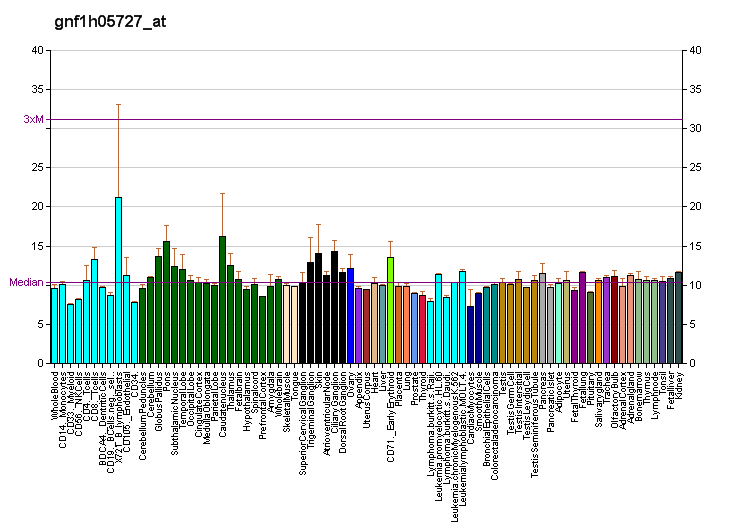

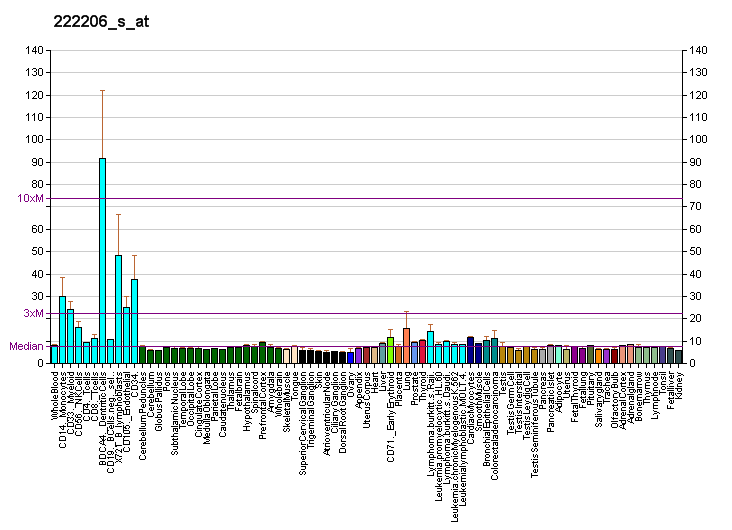
RNA expression pattern
Bgee	Human / Mouse (ortholog); Top expressed in: mucosa of transverse colon; stromal cell of endometrium; left adrenal gland; right adrenal gland; left adrenal cortex; right adrenal cortex; body of pancreas; right lobe of liver; granulocyte; right hemisphere of cerebellum / Top expressed in: granulocyte; right kidney; interventricular septum; lip; spermatocyte; muscle of thigh; yolk sac; tail of embryo; ventricular zone; neural layer of retina; More reference expression data
BioGPS	More reference expression data
Gene ontology
Molecular function	protein binding
Cellular component	integral component of membrane; endoplasmic reticulum membrane; membrane; endoplasmic reticulum; protein-containing complex
Biological process	regulation of protein-containing complex assembly; protein destabilization; regulation of signal transduction; protein stabilization; regulation of protein complex stability
Sources:Amigo / QuickGO
Orthologs
Databases	NCBI: entry; OMA: entry
Species	Human	Mouse
Entrez	56926	103425
Ensembl	ENSG00000125912	ENSMUSG00000020238
UniProt	Q969V3	Q8VCM8
RefSeq (mRNA)	NM_020170; NM_001321463	NM_134009
RefSeq (protein)	NP_001308392; NP_064555	NP_598770
Location (UCSC)	Chr 19: 3.19 – 3.21 Mb	Chr 10: 81.32 – 81.33 Mb
PubMed search
- Wikidata
View/Edit Human	View/Edit Mouse

Nicalin is a protein that in humans is encoded by the NCLN gene.
