= Zinc finger protein 257 =

Protein found in humans

ZNF257

Identifiers
- Aliases: ZNF257, BMZF-4, BMZF4, zinc finger protein 257
- External IDs: OMIM: 606957; GeneCards: ZNF257

Gene location (Human)
Chr.	Chromosome 19 (human)
Band	19p12	Start	22,052,430 bp
Band	19p12	End	22,091,480 bp
RNA expression pattern
Bgee	Human / Mouse (ortholog); Top expressed in: gonad; oocyte; testicle; ventricular zone; buccal mucosa cell; secondary oocyte; islet of Langerhans; Achilles tendon; lymph node; ganglionic eminence / n/a; More reference expression data
BioGPS	n/a
Gene ontology
Molecular function	DNA binding; zinc ion binding; metal ion binding; nucleic acid binding; DNA-binding transcription factor activity, RNA polymerase II-specific
Cellular component	intracellular anatomical structure; nucleus
Biological process	transcription, DNA-templated; regulation of transcription, DNA-templated; regulation of transcription by RNA polymerase II
Sources:Amigo / QuickGO
Orthologs
Databases	NCBI: entry; OMA: entry
Species	Human	Mouse
Entrez	113835	n/a
Ensembl	ENSG00000197134	n/a
UniProt	Q9Y2Q1	n/a
RefSeq (mRNA)	NM_033468; NM_001316996; NM_001316997; NM_001316998	n/a
RefSeq (protein)	NP_001303925; NP_001303926; NP_001303927; NP_258429	n/a
Location (UCSC)	Chr 19: 22.05 – 22.09 Mb	n/a
PubMed search		n/a
- Wikidata
View/Edit Human

Zinc finger protein 257 is a protein that in humans is encoded by the ZNF257 gene.
