= Zinc finger protein 737 =

Protein found in humans

ZNF737

Identifiers
- Aliases: ZNF737, ZNF102, zinc finger protein 737
- External IDs: OMIM: 603984; GeneCards: ZNF737

Gene location (Human)
Chr.	Chromosome 19 (human)
Band	19p12	Start	20,535,825 bp
Band	19p12	End	20,565,809 bp
RNA expression pattern
Bgee	Human / Mouse (ortholog); Top expressed in: corpus callosum; ganglionic eminence; endometrium; Achilles tendon; right lobe of thyroid gland; islet of Langerhans; lymph node; left lobe of thyroid gland; right adrenal cortex; ovary / n/a; More reference expression data
BioGPS	n/a
Gene ontology
Molecular function	DNA binding; metal ion binding; nucleic acid binding; DNA-binding transcription factor activity, RNA polymerase II-specific
Cellular component	intracellular anatomical structure; nucleus
Biological process	transcription, DNA-templated; regulation of transcription, DNA-templated; regulation of transcription by RNA polymerase II
Sources:Amigo / QuickGO
Orthologs
Databases	NCBI: entry; OMA: entry
Species	Human	Mouse
Entrez	100129842	n/a
Ensembl	ENSG00000237440	n/a
UniProt	O75373	n/a
RefSeq (mRNA)	NM_001159293	n/a
RefSeq (protein)	NP_001152765	n/a
Location (UCSC)	Chr 19: 20.54 – 20.57 Mb	n/a
PubMed search		n/a
- Wikidata
View/Edit Human

Zinc finger protein 737 is a protein that in humans is encoded by the ZNF737 gene.
