= ZFP82 zinc finger protein =

Protein-coding gene in the species Homo sapiens

ZFP82

Identifiers
- Aliases: ZFP82, ZNF545, ZFP82 zinc finger protein
- External IDs: MGI: 1890753; GeneCards: ZFP82

Gene location (Human)
Chr.	Chromosome 19 (human)
Band	19q13.12	Start	36,383,120 bp
Band	19q13.12	End	36,418,644 bp

Gene location (Mouse)
Chr.	Chromosome 7 (mouse)
Band	7|7 B1	Start	29,753,914 bp
Band	7|7 B1	End	29,772,325 bp
RNA expression pattern
Bgee	Human / Mouse (ortholog); Top expressed in: secondary oocyte; gonad; ventricular zone; retinal pigment epithelium; ganglionic eminence; testicle; pons; corpus epididymis; thalamus; subthalamic nucleus / Top expressed in: zygote; embryo; embryo; ventricular zone; tail of embryo; morula; muscle of thigh; esophagus; neural tube; neural layer of retina; More reference expression data
BioGPS	n/a
Gene ontology
Molecular function	DNA-binding transcription factor activity; DNA binding; metal ion binding; nucleic acid binding; DNA-binding transcription factor activity, RNA polymerase II-specific
Cellular component	intracellular anatomical structure; nucleus
Biological process	regulation of transcription, DNA-templated; transcription, DNA-templated; regulation of transcription by RNA polymerase II
Sources:Amigo / QuickGO
Orthologs
Databases	NCBI: entry; OMA: entry
Species	Human	Mouse
Entrez	284406	330502
Ensembl	ENSG00000181007	ENSMUSG00000098022
UniProt	Q8N141	Q6P9Y7
RefSeq (mRNA)	NM_133466; NM_001321917; NM_001321918; NM_001321919	NM_001252519; NM_001253385; NM_177889
RefSeq (protein)	NP_001308846; NP_001308847; NP_001308848; NP_597723	NP_001239448; NP_001240314; NP_808557
Location (UCSC)	Chr 19: 36.38 – 36.42 Mb	Chr 7: 29.75 – 29.77 Mb
PubMed search
- Wikidata
View/Edit Human	View/Edit Mouse

ZFP82 zinc finger protein is a protein that in humans is encoded by the ZFP82 gene.
