= Zinc finger protein 536 =

Protein found in humans

ZNF536

Identifiers
- Aliases: ZNF536, zinc finger protein 536
- External IDs: OMIM: 618037; MGI: 1926102; GeneCards: ZNF536

Gene location (Human)
Chr.	Chromosome 19 (human)
Band	19q12	Start	30,228,290 bp
Band	19q12	End	30,713,538 bp

Gene location (Mouse)
Chr.	Chromosome 7 (mouse)
Band	7|7 B2-B3	Start	37,318,024 bp
Band	7|7 B2-B3	End	37,773,641 bp
RNA expression pattern
Bgee	Human / Mouse (ortholog); Top expressed in: buccal mucosa cell; retinal pigment epithelium; corpus callosum; inferior ganglion of vagus nerve; cerebellar vermis; sural nerve; pons; medulla oblongata; C1 segment; Brodmann area 46 / Top expressed in: epithelium of lens; neural layer of retina; retinal pigment epithelium; sciatic nerve; ciliary body; lumbar subsegment of spinal cord; ventricular zone; Rostral migratory stream; iris; pelvic ganglion; More reference expression data
BioGPS	n/a
Gene ontology
Molecular function	RNA polymerase II cis-regulatory region sequence-specific DNA binding; DNA binding; DNA-binding transcription repressor activity, RNA polymerase II-specific; retinoic acid-responsive element binding; metal ion binding; nucleic acid binding; DNA-binding transcription factor activity, RNA polymerase II-specific
Cellular component	nucleus
Biological process	negative regulation of retinoic acid receptor signaling pathway; multicellular organism development; regulation of transcription, DNA-templated; negative regulation of transcription by RNA polymerase II; negative regulation of neuron differentiation; signal transduction; transcription, DNA-templated
Sources:Amigo / QuickGO
Orthologs
Databases	NCBI: entry; OMA: entry
Species	Human	Mouse
Entrez	9745	243937
Ensembl	ENSG00000198597	ENSMUSG00000043456
UniProt	O15090	Q8K083
RefSeq (mRNA)	NM_014717; NM_001352260; NM_001376110; NM_001376111	NM_172385
RefSeq (protein)	NP_055532; NP_001339189; NP_001363039; NP_001363040	NP_759017; NP_001391020; NP_001391022; NP_001391023; NP_001391024 NP_001391025; NP_001391026; NP_001391028; NP_001391029
Location (UCSC)	Chr 19: 30.23 – 30.71 Mb	Chr 7: 37.32 – 37.77 Mb
PubMed search
- Wikidata
View/Edit Human	View/Edit Mouse

Zinc finger protein 536 is a protein that in humans is encoded by the ZNF536 gene.
