= Olfactomedin 2 =

Protein-coding gene in the species Homo sapiens

OLFM2

Identifiers
- Aliases: OLFM2, NOE2, NOELIN2, NOELIN2_V1, OlfC, olfactomedin 2
- External IDs: OMIM: 617492; MGI: 3045350; HomoloGene: 14380; GeneCards: OLFM2; OMA:OLFM2 - orthologs

Gene location (Human)
Chr.	Chromosome 19 (human)
Band	19p13.2	Start	9,853,718 bp
Band	19p13.2	End	9,936,515 bp

Gene location (Mouse)
Chr.	Chromosome 9 (mouse)
Band	9|9 A3	Start	20,578,986 bp
Band	9|9 A3	End	20,657,645 bp
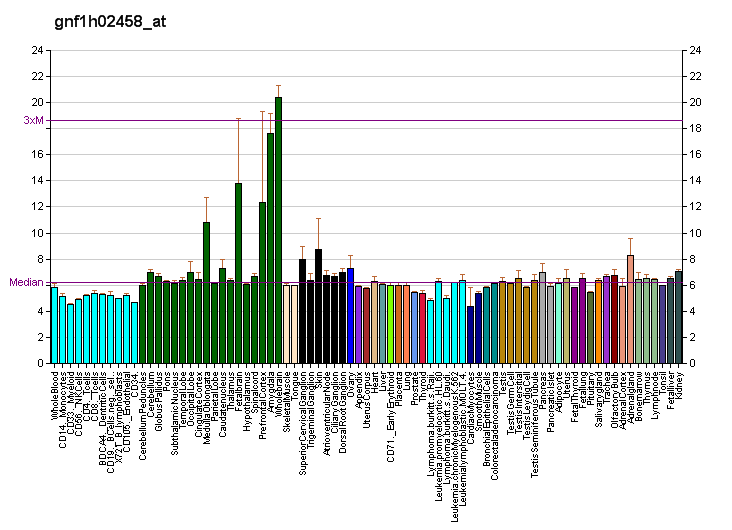
RNA expression pattern
Bgee	Human / Mouse (ortholog); Top expressed in: ganglionic eminence; ventricular zone; cingulate gyrus; anterior cingulate cortex; right frontal lobe; Brodmann area 9; prefrontal cortex; amygdala; skin of leg; caudate nucleus / Top expressed in: visual cortex; primary visual cortex; superior frontal gyrus; habenula; dorsomedial hypothalamic nucleus; lumbar subsegment of spinal cord; primary motor cortex; prefrontal cortex; cingulate gyrus; piriform cortex; More reference expression data
BioGPS	More reference expression data
Gene ontology
Molecular function	protein binding
Cellular component	cytoplasm; synaptic membrane; extracellular region; cell junction; AMPA glutamate receptor complex; synapse; membrane; nucleus; nucleoplasm; glutamatergic synapse; extrinsic component of synaptic membrane
Biological process	positive regulation of smooth muscle cell differentiation; locomotory behavior; visual perception; protein secretion; regulation of vascular associated smooth muscle cell dedifferentiation
Sources:Amigo / QuickGO
Orthologs
Species	Human	Mouse
Entrez	93145	244723
Ensembl	ENSG00000105088	ENSMUSG00000032172
UniProt	O95897	Q8BM13
RefSeq (mRNA)	NM_058164; NM_001304347; NM_001304348	NM_173777; NM_001357635; NM_001357639
RefSeq (protein)	NP_001291276; NP_001291277; NP_477512	NP_776138; NP_001344564; NP_001344568
Location (UCSC)	Chr 19: 9.85 – 9.94 Mb	Chr 9: 20.58 – 20.66 Mb
PubMed search
- Wikidata
View/Edit Human	View/Edit Mouse

Olfactomedin 2, also known as noelin 2, is a protein that in humans is encoded by the OLFM2 gene.
