= Zinc finger protein 613 =

Protein found in humans

ZNF613

Identifiers
- Aliases: ZNF613, zinc finger protein 613
- External IDs: MGI: 1919404; GeneCards: ZNF613

Gene location (Human)
Chr.	Chromosome 19 (human)
Band	19q13.41	Start	51,927,147 bp
Band	19q13.41	End	51,948,759 bp

Gene location (Mouse)
Chr.	Chromosome 5 (mouse)
Band	5|5 G2	Start	138,441,468 bp
Band	5|5 G2	End	138,460,694 bp
RNA expression pattern
Bgee	Human / Mouse (ortholog); Top expressed in: gonad; ventricular zone; testicle; ganglionic eminence; sural nerve; granulocyte; islet of Langerhans; Achilles tendon; stromal cell of endometrium; apex of heart / Top expressed in: hand; genital tubercle; medial ganglionic eminence; tail of embryo; neural tube; otolith organ; utricle; Rostral migratory stream; lumbar subsegment of spinal cord; ventricular zone; More reference expression data
BioGPS	n/a
Gene ontology
Molecular function	DNA-binding transcription factor activity; DNA binding; metal ion binding; nucleic acid binding; DNA-binding transcription factor activity, RNA polymerase II-specific
Cellular component	intracellular anatomical structure; nucleus; nucleoplasm
Biological process	regulation of transcription, DNA-templated; negative regulation of transcription by RNA polymerase II; transcription, DNA-templated; positive regulation of transcription by RNA polymerase II
Sources:Amigo / QuickGO
Orthologs
Databases	NCBI: entry; OMA: entry
Species	Human	Mouse
Entrez	79898	72154
Ensembl	ENSG00000176024	ENSMUSG00000036898
UniProt	Q6PF04	n/a
RefSeq (mRNA)	NM_001031721; NM_024840	NM_028130
RefSeq (protein)	NP_001026891; NP_079116	n/a
Location (UCSC)	Chr 19: 51.93 – 51.95 Mb	Chr 5: 138.44 – 138.46 Mb
PubMed search
- Wikidata
View/Edit Human	View/Edit Mouse

Zinc finger protein 613 is a protein that in humans is encoded by the ZNF613 gene.
