= Zinc finger protein 878 =

Mammalian protein found in humans

ZNF878

Identifiers
- Aliases: ZNF878, zinc finger protein 878
- External IDs: MGI: 2684459; GeneCards: ZNF878

Gene location (Human)
Chr.	Chromosome 19 (human)
Band	19p13.2	Start	12,043,805 bp
Band	19p13.2	End	12,052,961 bp

Gene location (Mouse)
Chr.	Chromosome 8 (mouse)
Band	8|8 B3.3	Start	72,662,479 bp
Band	8|8 B3.3	End	72,688,473 bp
RNA expression pattern
Bgee	Human / Mouse (ortholog); Top expressed in: testicle; placenta; endometrium; ventricular zone; ganglionic eminence; right ovary; islet of Langerhans; tonsil; bone marrow; right adrenal gland / Top expressed in: ventricular zone; ovary; muscle of thigh; quadriceps femoris muscle; lens; tail of embryo; ganglionic eminence; epiblast; right kidney; neural tube; More reference expression data
BioGPS	n/a
Gene ontology
Molecular function	nucleic acid binding; metal ion binding; DNA-binding transcription factor activity, RNA polymerase II-specific
Cellular component	nucleus; intracellular anatomical structure
Biological process	regulation of transcription, DNA-templated; transcription, DNA-templated; regulation of transcription by RNA polymerase II
Sources:Amigo / QuickGO
Orthologs
Databases	NCBI: entry; OMA: entry
Species	Human	Mouse
Entrez	729747	170938
Ensembl	ENSG00000257446	ENSMUSG00000066880
UniProt	C9JN71	n/a
RefSeq (mRNA)	NM_001080404	NM_133358
RefSeq (protein)	NP_001073873	n/a
Location (UCSC)	Chr 19: 12.04 – 12.05 Mb	Chr 8: 72.66 – 72.69 Mb
PubMed search
- Wikidata
View/Edit Human	View/Edit Mouse

Zinc finger protein 878 is a protein that, in humans, is encoded by the ZNF878 gene.
