= Zinc finger protein 507 =

Protein found in humans

ZNF507

Identifiers
- Aliases: ZNF507, zinc finger protein 507, Zfp507
- External IDs: MGI: 1916378; GeneCards: ZNF507

Gene location (Human)
Chr.	Chromosome 19 (human)
Band	19q13.11	Start	32,345,594 bp
Band	19q13.11	End	32,387,667 bp

Gene location (Mouse)
Chr.	Chromosome 7 (mouse)
Band	7|7 B2	Start	35,471,768 bp
Band	7|7 B2	End	35,502,428 bp
RNA expression pattern
Bgee	Human / Mouse (ortholog); Top expressed in: endothelial cell; Skeletal muscle tissue of rectus abdominis; corpus callosum; palpebral conjunctiva; Achilles tendon; sperm; secondary oocyte; epithelium of nasopharynx; Brodmann area 23; mucosa of paranasal sinus / Top expressed in: hand; renal corpuscle; otolith organ; utricle; medullary collecting duct; cumulus cell; superior cervical ganglion; foot; primitive streak; tail of embryo; More reference expression data
BioGPS	n/a
Gene ontology
Molecular function	DNA binding; metal ion binding; nucleic acid binding; DNA-binding transcription factor activity, RNA polymerase II-specific; RNA polymerase II core promoter sequence-specific DNA binding
Cellular component	nucleus; histone methyltransferase complex
Biological process	regulation of transcription, DNA-templated; transcription, DNA-templated; regulation of transcription by RNA polymerase II; regulation of gene expression
Sources:Amigo / QuickGO
Orthologs
Databases	NCBI: entry; OMA: entry
Species	Human	Mouse
Entrez	22847	668501
Ensembl	ENSG00000168813	ENSMUSG00000044452
UniProt	Q8TCN5	Q6ZPY5
RefSeq (mRNA)	NM_014910; NM_001136156	NM_177739
RefSeq (protein)	NP_001129628; NP_055725	NP_808407
Location (UCSC)	Chr 19: 32.35 – 32.39 Mb	Chr 7: 35.47 – 35.5 Mb
PubMed search
- Wikidata
View/Edit Human	View/Edit Mouse

Zinc finger protein 507 is a protein that in humans is encoded by the ZNF507 gene.
