= CLASRP =

Protein-coding gene in humans

Identifiers
- Aliases: CLASRP, CLASP, SFRS16, SWAP2, CLK4 associating serine/arginine rich protein
- External IDs: OMIM: 618532; MGI: 1855695; GeneCards: CLASRP

Gene location (Human)
Chr.	Chromosome 19 (human)
Band	19q13.32	Start	45,039,045 bp
Band	19q13.32	End	45,070,956 bp

Gene location (Mouse)
Chr.	Chromosome 7 (mouse)
Band	7|7 A3	Start	19,581,035 bp
Band	7|7 A3	End	19,604,486 bp
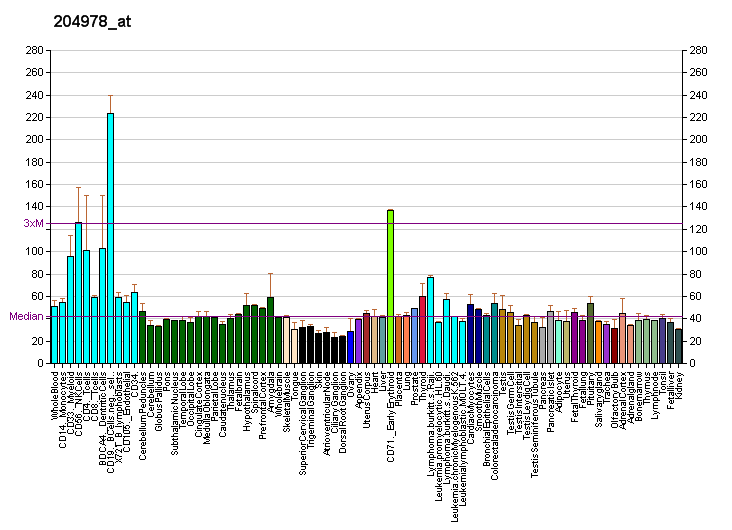
RNA expression pattern
Bgee	Human / Mouse (ortholog); Top expressed in: anterior pituitary; sural nerve; left ovary; right ovary; right lobe of thyroid gland; C1 segment; right hemisphere of cerebellum; left lobe of thyroid gland; granulocyte; body of uterus / Top expressed in: neural layer of retina; superior frontal gyrus; cerebellar cortex; granulocyte; internal carotid artery; external carotid artery; dorsal tegmental nucleus; ventricular zone; primary visual cortex; seminiferous tubule; More reference expression data
BioGPS	More reference expression data
Gene ontology
Molecular function	protein binding
Cellular component	nucleus; nucleoplasm
Biological process	RNA splicing; mRNA processing
Sources:Amigo / QuickGO
Orthologs
Databases	NCBI: entry; OMA: entry
Species	Human	Mouse
Entrez	11129	53609
Ensembl	ENSG00000104859	ENSMUSG00000061028
UniProt	Q8N2M8	Q8CFC7
RefSeq (mRNA)	NM_001278439; NM_007056	NM_016680
RefSeq (protein)	NP_001265368; NP_008987; NP_008987.2	NP_057889
Location (UCSC)	Chr 19: 45.04 – 45.07 Mb	Chr 7: 19.58 – 19.6 Mb
PubMed search
- Wikidata
View/Edit Human	View/Edit Mouse

CLK4-associating serine/arginine rich protein is a protein that in humans is encoded by the CLASPRP gene (previously SFRS16). Not much has been reported about the function of the CLASPRP protein, but it is predicted to be involved in mRNA processing and splicing.
