= FIZ1 =

Protein-coding gene in the species Homo sapiens

Identifiers
- Aliases: FIZ1, ZNF798, FLT3 interacting zinc finger 1
- External IDs: OMIM: 609133; MGI: 1344336; GeneCards: FIZ1

Gene location (Human)
| Chr. | Chromosome 19 (human) |
| Band | 19q13.42 | Start | 55,591,376 bp |
| Band | 19q13.42 | End | 55,601,970 bp |

Gene location (Mouse)
| Chr. | Chromosome 7 (mouse) |
| Band | 7|7 A1 | Start | 5,010,058 bp |
| Band | 7|7 A1 | End | 5,017,696 bp |
RNA expression pattern
| Bgee | Human / Mouse (ortholog); Top expressed in: cardiac muscle tissue of right atrium; myocardium of left ventricle; nasal epithelium; Skeletal muscle tissue of rectus abdominis; ventral tegmental area; cardia; tibialis anterior muscle; subthalamic nucleus; external globus pallidus; body of tongue / Top expressed in: zygote; Bowman's capsule; internal carotid artery; medial ganglionic eminence; external carotid artery; ventricular zone; primitive streak; tail of embryo; interventricular septum; epiblast; More reference expression data |
| BioGPS | n/a |
Gene ontology
| Molecular function | receptor tyrosine kinase binding; metal ion binding; nucleic acid binding; DNA-binding transcription factor activity, RNA polymerase II-specific |
| Cellular component | cytoplasm; nucleus |
| Biological process | positive regulation of protein phosphorylation; regulation of transcription, DNA-templated; transcription, DNA-templated; regulation of transcription by RNA polymerase II |
Sources:Amigo / QuickGO
Orthologs
| Databases | NCBI: entry; OMA: entry |
| Species | Human | Mouse |
| Entrez | 84922 | 23877 |
| Ensembl | ENSG00000179943 | ENSMUSG00000061374 |
| UniProt | Q96SL8 | Q9WTJ4 |
| RefSeq (mRNA) | NM_032836 | NM_001110328; NM_001110329; NM_001110330; NM_011813; NM_001360241 NM_001360242; NM_001360243 |
| RefSeq (protein) | NP_116225 | NP_001103798; NP_001103799; NP_001103800; NP_035943; NP_001347170 NP_001347171; NP_001347172 |
| Location (UCSC) | Chr 19: 55.59 – 55.6 Mb | Chr 7: 5.01 – 5.02 Mb |
| PubMed search |
- Wikidata
| View/Edit Human | View/Edit Mouse |

FLT3 interacting zinc finger 1 is a protein that in humans is encoded by the FIZ1 gene.

== Function ==
This gene encodes zinc finger protein, which interacts with a receptor tyrosine kinase involved in the regulation of hematopoietic and lymphoid cells. This gene product also interacts with a transcription factor that regulates the expression of rod-specific genes in retina. [provided by RefSeq, Jul 2008].
