= Zinc finger protein 347 =

Protein found in humans

ZNF347

Identifiers
- Aliases: ZNF347, ZNF1111, zinc finger protein 347
- External IDs: GeneCards: ZNF347
Available structures
PDB	Human UniProt search: PDBe RCSB
PDB	List of PDB id codes 2EMA, 2EMP, 2EN4, 2ENE, 2ENF, 2EOE, 2EOW, 2EQ0, 2EQ1, 2EQ2, 2EQ3, 2YTI, 2YTK, 2YTN, 2YTR, 2YU8

Gene location (Human)
Chr.	Chromosome 19 (human)
Band	19q13.42	Start	53,124,072 bp
Band	19q13.42	End	53,159,075 bp
RNA expression pattern
Bgee	Human / Mouse (ortholog); Top expressed in: Achilles tendon; epithelium of colon; sural nerve; testicle; gonad; buccal mucosa cell; ganglionic eminence; islet of Langerhans; stromal cell of endometrium; right hemisphere of cerebellum / n/a; More reference expression data
BioGPS	n/a
Gene ontology
Molecular function	DNA binding; metal ion binding; nucleic acid binding; DNA-binding transcription factor activity, RNA polymerase II-specific
Cellular component	intracellular anatomical structure; nucleus
Biological process	regulation of transcription, DNA-templated; transcription, DNA-templated; regulation of transcription by RNA polymerase II
Sources:Amigo / QuickGO
Orthologs
Databases	NCBI: entry; OMA: entry
Species	Human	Mouse
Entrez	84671	n/a
Ensembl	ENSG00000197937	n/a
UniProt	Q96SE7	n/a
RefSeq (mRNA)	NM_001172674; NM_001172675; NM_032584	n/a
RefSeq (protein)	NP_001166145; NP_001166146; NP_115973	n/a
Location (UCSC)	Chr 19: 53.12 – 53.16 Mb	n/a
PubMed search		n/a
- Wikidata
View/Edit Human

Zinc finger protein 347 is a protein that in humans is encoded by the ZNF347 gene.
