= Zinc finger protein 665 =

Protein found in humans

ZNF665

Identifiers
- Aliases: ZNF665, ZFP160L, zinc finger protein 665
- External IDs: MGI: 108187; GeneCards: ZNF665

Gene location (Human)
Chr.	Chromosome 19 (human)
Band	19q13.42	Start	53,159,213 bp
Band	19q13.42	End	53,193,386 bp

Gene location (Mouse)
Chr.	Chromosome 17 (mouse)
Band	17 A3.2|17 11.4 cM	Start	21,229,165 bp
Band	17 A3.2|17 11.4 cM	End	21,263,332 bp
RNA expression pattern
Bgee	Human / Mouse (ortholog); Top expressed in: corpus epididymis; buccal mucosa cell; caput epididymis; tail of epididymis; internal globus pallidus; pancreatic ductal cell; tendon of biceps brachii; postcentral gyrus; cartilage tissue; superficial temporal artery / Top expressed in: Rostral migratory stream; saccule; zygote; pineal gland; genital tubercle; otic placode; secondary oocyte; superior cervical ganglion; cerebellar vermis; lobe of cerebellum; More reference expression data
BioGPS	n/a
Gene ontology
Molecular function	DNA binding; metal ion binding; nucleic acid binding; DNA-binding transcription factor activity, RNA polymerase II-specific
Cellular component	nucleus
Biological process	regulation of transcription, DNA-templated; transcription, DNA-templated; regulation of transcription by RNA polymerase II
Sources:Amigo / QuickGO
Orthologs
Databases	NCBI: entry; OMA: entry
Species	Human	Mouse
Entrez	79788	224585
Ensembl	ENSG00000197497	ENSMUSG00000067942
UniProt	Q9H7R5	n/a
RefSeq (mRNA)	NM_024733; NM_001353457; NM_001353458; NM_001353459	NM_145483
RefSeq (protein)	NP_079009; NP_001340386; NP_001340387; NP_001340388	n/a
Location (UCSC)	Chr 19: 53.16 – 53.19 Mb	Chr 17: 21.23 – 21.26 Mb
PubMed search
- Wikidata
View/Edit Human	View/Edit Mouse

Zinc finger protein 665 is a protein that in humans is encoded by the ZNF665 gene.
