= ZNF331 =

Protein-coding gene in the species Homo sapiens

Identifiers
- Aliases: ZNF331, RITA, ZNF361, ZNF463, zinc finger protein 331
- External IDs: OMIM: 606043; GeneCards: ZNF331

Gene location (Human)
Chr.	Chromosome 19 (human)
Band	19q13.42	Start	53,519,527 bp
Band	19q13.42	End	53,580,269 bp
RNA expression pattern
Bgee	Human / Mouse (ortholog); Top expressed in: lower lobe of lung; sperm; anterior pituitary; right lung; left ovary; mucosa of paranasal sinus; tail of epididymis; beta cell; left uterine tube; right ovary / n/a; More reference expression data
BioGPS	n/a
Gene ontology
Molecular function	DNA binding; zinc ion binding; metal ion binding; nucleic acid binding; DNA-binding transcription factor activity, RNA polymerase II-specific
Cellular component	intracellular anatomical structure; nucleus
Biological process	transcription, DNA-templated; regulation of transcription, DNA-templated; regulation of transcription by RNA polymerase II
Sources:Amigo / QuickGO
Orthologs
Databases	NCBI: entry; OMA: entry
Species	Human	Mouse
Entrez	55422	n/a
Ensembl	ENSG00000130844	n/a
UniProt	Q9NQX6; Q71QC5	n/a
RefSeq (mRNA)	NM_001079906; NM_001079907; NM_001253798; NM_001253799; NM_001253800 NM_001253801; NM_018555; NM_001317113; NM_001317114; NM_001317115; NM_001317116; NM_001317117; NM_001317118; NM_001317119; NM_001317120; NM_001317121	n/a
RefSeq (protein)	NP_001073375; NP_001073376; NP_001240727; NP_001240728; NP_001240729 NP_001240730; NP_001304042; NP_001304043; NP_001304044; NP_001304045; NP_001304046; NP_001304047; NP_001304048; NP_001304049; NP_001304050; NP_061025; NP_001073375.1; NP_001304050.1	n/a
Location (UCSC)	Chr 19: 53.52 – 53.58 Mb	n/a
PubMed search		n/a
- Wikidata
View/Edit Human

Zinc finger protein 331 is a protein that in humans is encoded by the ZNF331 gene.

Zinc finger proteins have been shown to interact with nucleic acids and to have diverse functions. The zinc finger domain is a conserved amino acid sequence motif containing 2 specifically positioned cysteines and 2 histidines that are involved in coordinating zinc. Kruppel-related proteins form one family of zinc finger proteins. See ZFP93 (MIM 604749) for additional information on zinc finger proteins.[supplied by OMIM]
