= SBNO2 =

Protein-coding gene in the species Homo sapiens

Identifiers
- Aliases: SBNO2, KIAA0963, SNO, STNO, strawberry notch homolog 2 (Drosophila), strawberry notch homolog 2
- External IDs: OMIM: 615729; MGI: 2448490; HomoloGene: 8981; GeneCards: SBNO2; OMA:SBNO2 - orthologs

Gene location (Human)
Chr.	Chromosome 19 (human)
Band	19p13.3	Start	1,107,637 bp
Band	19p13.3	End	1,174,268 bp

Gene location (Mouse)
Chr.	Chromosome 10 (mouse)
Band	10|10 C1	Start	79,892,826 bp
Band	10|10 C1	End	79,941,405 bp
RNA expression pattern
Bgee	Human / Mouse (ortholog); Top expressed in: blood; spleen; appendix; left uterine tube; upper lobe of left lung; granulocyte; minor salivary glands; left adrenal cortex; sural nerve; skin of abdomen / Top expressed in: granulocyte; internal carotid artery; Rostral migratory stream; external carotid artery; lip; molar; knee joint; esophagus; paraventricular nucleus of hypothalamus; inferior colliculi; More reference expression data
BioGPS	n/a
Orthologs
Species	Human	Mouse
Entrez	22904	216161
Ensembl	ENSG00000064932; ENSG00000278788	ENSMUSG00000035673
UniProt	Q9Y2G9	Q7TNB8
RefSeq (mRNA)	NM_001100122; NM_014963	NM_183426; NM_001359635; NM_001359636; NM_001359637
RefSeq (protein)	NP_001093592; NP_055778	NP_906271; NP_001346564; NP_001346565; NP_001346566
Location (UCSC)	Chr 19: 1.11 – 1.17 Mb	Chr 10: 79.89 – 79.94 Mb
PubMed search
- Wikidata
View/Edit Human	View/Edit Mouse

Strawberry notch homolog 2 (Drosophila) is a protein that in humans is encoded by the SBNO2 gene.
