= ZNF649 =

Protein-coding gene in the species Homo sapiens

Identifiers
- Aliases: ZNF649, zinc finger protein 649
- External IDs: OMIM: 611903; GeneCards: ZNF649

Gene location (Human)
Chr.	Chromosome 19 (human)
Band	19q13.41	Start	51,889,235 bp
Band	19q13.41	End	51,905,040 bp
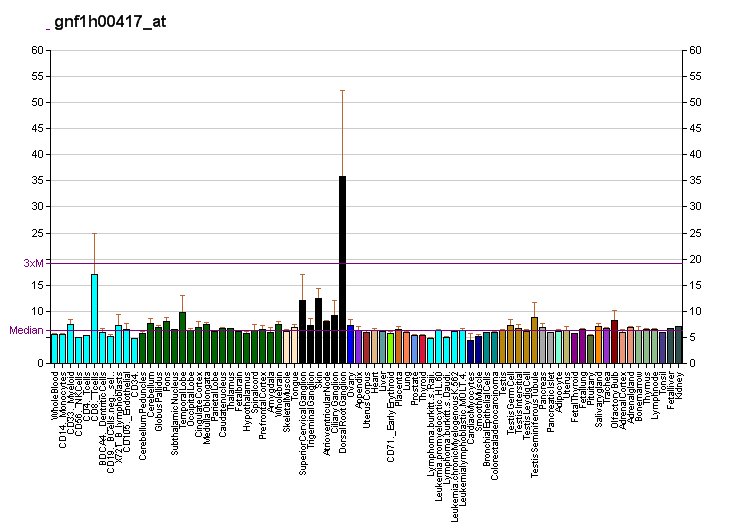
RNA expression pattern
Bgee	Human / Mouse (ortholog); Top expressed in: corpus callosum; ganglionic eminence; ventricular zone; sural nerve; gonad; testicle; Achilles tendon; islet of Langerhans; endometrium; smooth muscle tissue / n/a; More reference expression data
BioGPS	More reference expression data
Gene ontology
Molecular function	DNA-binding transcription factor activity; DNA binding; protein binding; metal ion binding; nucleic acid binding; DNA-binding transcription factor activity, RNA polymerase II-specific
Cellular component	intracellular anatomical structure; nucleus; extracellular space; nucleoplasm
Biological process	regulation of transcription, DNA-templated; negative regulation of transcription by RNA polymerase II; transcription, DNA-templated; positive regulation of transcription by RNA polymerase II
Sources:Amigo / QuickGO
Orthologs
Databases	NCBI: entry; OMA: entry
Species	Human	Mouse
Entrez	65251	n/a
Ensembl	ENSG00000198093	n/a
UniProt	Q9BS31	n/a
RefSeq (mRNA)	NM_023074	n/a
RefSeq (protein)	NP_075562	n/a
Location (UCSC)	Chr 19: 51.89 – 51.91 Mb	n/a
PubMed search		n/a
- Wikidata
View/Edit Human

Zinc finger protein 649 is a protein that in humans is encoded by the ZNF649 gene on Human Chromozone 19 containing 5 exons.
