= Zinc finger protein 266 =

Protein found in humans

ZNF266

Identifiers
- Aliases: ZNF266, HZF1, zinc finger protein 266
- External IDs: OMIM: 604751; MGI: 1924769; GeneCards: ZNF266

Gene location (Human)
Chr.	Chromosome 19 (human)
Band	19p13.2	Start	9,412,461 bp
Band	19p13.2	End	9,435,571 bp

Gene location (Mouse)
Chr.	Chromosome 9 (mouse)
Band	9|9 A3	Start	20,406,364 bp
Band	9|9 A3	End	20,432,713 bp
RNA expression pattern
Bgee	Human / Mouse (ortholog); Top expressed in: granulocyte; visceral pleura; tibia; spleen; parietal pleura; gastric mucosa; superficial temporal artery; trabecular bone; hair follicle; corpus epididymis / Top expressed in: hand; otolith organ; utricle; transitional epithelium of urinary bladder; Rostral migratory stream; primitive streak; medial ganglionic eminence; epidermis; hair follicle; left lung lobe; More reference expression data
BioGPS	n/a
Gene ontology
Molecular function	DNA binding; protein binding; metal ion binding; nucleic acid binding; DNA-binding transcription factor activity, RNA polymerase II-specific
Cellular component	intracellular anatomical structure; nucleus
Biological process	regulation of transcription, DNA-templated; transcription, DNA-templated; regulation of transcription by RNA polymerase II
Sources:Amigo / QuickGO
Orthologs
Databases	NCBI: entry; OMA: entry
Species	Human	Mouse
Entrez	10781	77519
Ensembl	ENSG00000174652	ENSMUSG00000060510
UniProt	Q14584	n/a
RefSeq (mRNA)	NM_001271314; NM_006631; NM_198058	NM_001082485; NM_001135019
RefSeq (protein)	NP_001258243; NP_006622; NP_001357303; NP_001357304; NP_001357305 NP_001357306; NP_001357307; NP_001357308; NP_001357309; NP_001357310; NP_001357311; NP_001357312; NP_001357313; NP_001357314; NP_001357315; NP_001357316; NP_001357317; NP_001357318; NP_001357319; NP_001357320; NP_001357321; NP_001357322; NP_001357323; NP_001357324; NP_001357325; NP_001357326; NP_001357327; NP_001357328; NP_001357329	n/a
Location (UCSC)	Chr 19: 9.41 – 9.44 Mb	Chr 9: 20.41 – 20.43 Mb
PubMed search
- Wikidata
View/Edit Human	View/Edit Mouse

Zinc finger protein 266 is a protein that in humans is encoded by the ZNF266 gene.

== Function ==
This gene encodes a protein containing many tandem zinc-finger motifs. Zinc fingers are protein or nucleic acid-binding domains, and may be involved in a variety of functions, including regulation of transcription. This gene is located in a cluster of similar genes encoding zinc finger proteins on chromosome 19. Alternative splicing results in multiple transcript variants for this gene.
