= LIM2 =

Protein-coding gene in the species Homo sapiens

Identifiers
- Aliases: LIM2, CTRCT19, MP17, MP19, lens intrinsic membrane protein 2
- External IDs: OMIM: 154045; MGI: 104698; HomoloGene: 12744; GeneCards: LIM2; OMA:LIM2 - orthologs

Gene location (Human)
Chr.	Chromosome 19 (human)
Band	19q13.41	Start	51,379,909 bp
Band	19q13.41	End	51,387,974 bp

Gene location (Mouse)
Chr.	Chromosome 7 (mouse)
Band	7 B3|7 28.25 cM	Start	43,079,512 bp
Band	7 B3|7 28.25 cM	End	43,085,420 bp
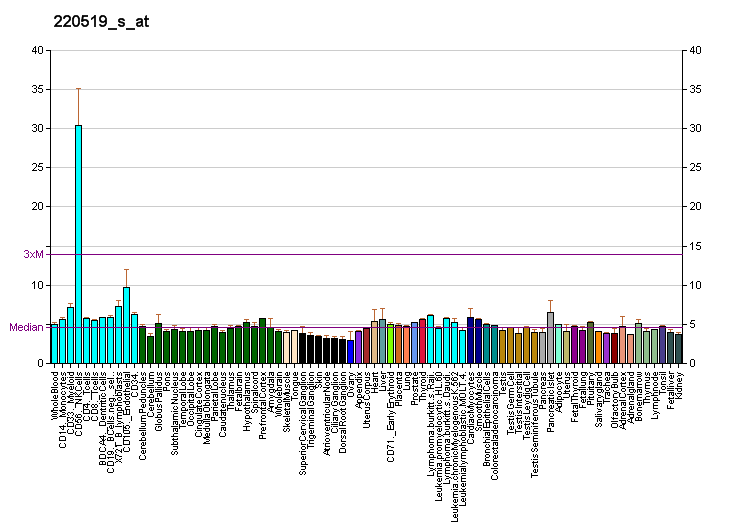
RNA expression pattern
Bgee	Human / Mouse (ortholog); Top expressed in: gonad; lens; granulocyte; retinal pigment epithelium; blood; bone marrow; apex of heart; placenta; lower respiratory tract; spleen / Top expressed in: lens; embryo; morula; neural layer of retina; blastocyst; bone marrow; stomach; intestine; More reference expression data
BioGPS	More reference expression data
Gene ontology
Molecular function	structural constituent of eye lens
Cellular component	integral component of membrane; vesicle; cell junction; plasma membrane; membrane
Biological process	camera-type eye development; lens development in camera-type eye; cell-cell junction assembly
Sources:Amigo / QuickGO
Orthologs
Species	Human	Mouse
Entrez	3982	233187
Ensembl	ENSG00000105370	ENSMUSG00000118560
UniProt	P55344	P56563
RefSeq (mRNA)	NM_030657; NM_001161748	NM_177693
RefSeq (protein)	NP_001155220; NP_085915	NP_808361
Location (UCSC)	Chr 19: 51.38 – 51.39 Mb	Chr 7: 43.08 – 43.09 Mb
PubMed search
- Wikidata
View/Edit Human	View/Edit Mouse

Lens fiber membrane intrinsic protein is a protein that in humans is encoded by the LIM2 gene.

The mammalian lens fiber cell membrane contains 5 major proteins ranging from 70 kD to 19 kD in size. The specific function of these proteins is unknown. Some of them have been shown to be involved in the formation of cataracts, e.g., crystalline-gamma-1 (CRYG1; MIM 123660). The second most abundant intrinsic membrane protein of the lens fiber cell is MP19, so named for major lens protein having a molecular weight of 19.5 kD.

This protein appears to contain 4 transmembrane domains, is a substrate for cAMP-dependent protein kinase and protein kinase C, and binds with calmodulin. Taken together, these suggest that MP19 functions in some way as a junctional component, possibly involved with lens cell communication. It has been shown to be involved with cataractogenesis.[supplied by OMIM]
