= ZNF225 =

Protein-coding gene in the species Homo sapiens

Identifiers
- Aliases: ZNF225, zinc finger protein 225
- External IDs: GeneCards: ZNF225

Gene location (Human)
Chr.	Chromosome 19 (human)
Band	19q13.31	Start	44,112,181 bp
Band	19q13.31	End	44,134,822 bp
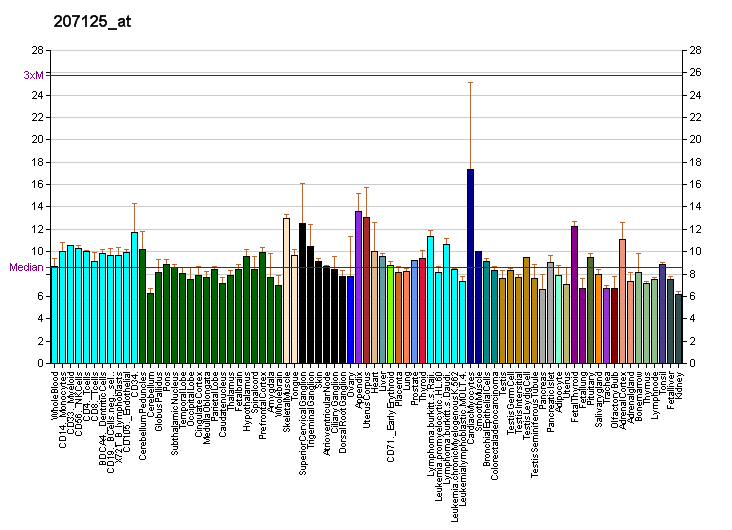
RNA expression pattern
Bgee	Human / Mouse (ortholog); Top expressed in: gonad; Achilles tendon; testicle; stromal cell of endometrium; tendon of biceps brachii; sperm; granulocyte; ventricular zone; right adrenal gland; ganglionic eminence / n/a; More reference expression data
BioGPS	More reference expression data
Gene ontology
Molecular function	metal ion binding; nucleic acid binding; DNA-binding transcription factor activity; DNA binding; DNA-binding transcription factor activity, RNA polymerase II-specific
Cellular component	intracellular anatomical structure; nucleus
Biological process	transcription, DNA-templated; regulation of transcription, DNA-templated; regulation of transcription by RNA polymerase II
Sources:Amigo / QuickGO
Orthologs
Databases	NCBI: entry; OMA: entry
Species	Human	Mouse
Entrez	7768	n/a
Ensembl	ENSG00000256294	n/a
UniProt	Q9UK10	n/a
RefSeq (mRNA)	NM_013362; NM_001321685	n/a
RefSeq (protein)	NP_001308614; NP_037494	n/a
Location (UCSC)	Chr 19: 44.11 – 44.13 Mb	n/a
PubMed search		n/a
- Wikidata
View/Edit Human

Zinc finger protein 225 is a protein that in humans is encoded by the ZNF225 gene.
