= Zinc finger protein 576 =

Protein found in humans

ZNF576

Identifiers
- Aliases: ZNF576, zinc finger protein 576
- External IDs: GeneCards: ZNF576

Gene location (Human)
Chr.	Chromosome 19 (human)
Band	19q13.31	Start	43,596,392 bp
Band	19q13.31	End	43,601,157 bp
RNA expression pattern
Bgee	Human / Mouse (ortholog); Top expressed in: gonad; prefrontal cortex; cerebellar vermis; mucosa of transverse colon; gastrocnemius muscle; right adrenal gland; apex of heart; right frontal lobe; right hemisphere of cerebellum; right lobe of liver / n/a; More reference expression data
BioGPS	n/a
Gene ontology
Molecular function	DNA binding; protein binding; metal ion binding; nucleic acid binding; DNA-binding transcription factor activity, RNA polymerase II-specific
Cellular component	nucleus
Biological process	regulation of transcription, DNA-templated; transcription, DNA-templated; regulation of transcription by RNA polymerase II
Sources:Amigo / QuickGO
Orthologs
Databases	NCBI: entry; OMA: entry
Species	Human	Mouse
Entrez	79177	n/a
Ensembl	ENSG00000124444	n/a
UniProt	Q9H609	n/a
RefSeq (mRNA)	NM_024327; NM_001145347	n/a
RefSeq (protein)	NP_001138819; NP_077303	n/a
Location (UCSC)	Chr 19: 43.6 – 43.6 Mb	n/a
PubMed search		n/a
- Wikidata
View/Edit Human

Zinc finger protein 576 is a protein that in humans is encoded by the ZNF576 gene.
