= Zinc finger protein 506 =

Protein found in humans

ZNF506

Identifiers
- Aliases: ZNF506, zinc finger protein 506
- External IDs: GeneCards: ZNF506

Gene location (Human)
Chr.	Chromosome 19 (human)
Band	19p13.11	Start	19,785,839 bp
Band	19p13.11	End	19,821,751 bp
RNA expression pattern
Bgee	Human / Mouse (ortholog); Top expressed in: epithelium of colon; Achilles tendon; tendon of biceps brachii; corpus callosum; buccal mucosa cell; sural nerve; caudate nucleus; nucleus accumbens; cerebellar cortex; cerebellar hemisphere / n/a; More reference expression data
BioGPS	n/a
Gene ontology
Molecular function	DNA binding; metal ion binding; nucleic acid binding; DNA-binding transcription factor activity, RNA polymerase II-specific
Cellular component	nucleolus; intracellular anatomical structure; nucleus
Biological process	transcription, DNA-templated; regulation of transcription, DNA-templated; regulation of transcription by RNA polymerase II
Sources:Amigo / QuickGO
Orthologs
Databases	NCBI: entry; OMA: entry
Species	Human	Mouse
Entrez	440515	n/a
Ensembl	ENSG00000081665	n/a
UniProt	Q5JVG8	n/a
RefSeq (mRNA)	NM_001145405; NM_001099269; NM_001145404	n/a
RefSeq (protein)	NP_001092739; NP_001138876	n/a
Location (UCSC)	Chr 19: 19.79 – 19.82 Mb	n/a
PubMed search		n/a
- Wikidata
View/Edit Human

Zinc finger protein 506 is a protein that in humans is encoded by the ZNF506 gene.
