= Zinc finger protein 772 =

Protein found in humans

ZNF772

Identifiers
- Aliases: ZNF772, zinc finger protein 772
- External IDs: GeneCards: ZNF772

Gene location (Human)
| Chr. | Chromosome 19 (human) |
| Band | 19q13.43 | Start | 57,466,663 bp |
| Band | 19q13.43 | End | 57,477,570 bp |
RNA expression pattern
| Bgee | Human / Mouse (ortholog); Top expressed in: corpus callosum; gonad; ganglionic eminence; ventricular zone; skeletal muscle tissue; testicle; islet of Langerhans; Achilles tendon; gastrocnemius muscle; stromal cell of endometrium / n/a; More reference expression data |
| BioGPS | n/a |
Gene ontology
| Molecular function | DNA binding; protein binding; metal ion binding; nucleic acid binding; DNA-binding transcription factor activity, RNA polymerase II-specific |
| Cellular component | intracellular anatomical structure; nucleus |
| Biological process | transcription, DNA-templated; regulation of transcription, DNA-templated; regulation of transcription by RNA polymerase II |
Sources:Amigo / QuickGO
Orthologs
| Databases | NCBI: entry; OMA: entry |
| Species | Human | Mouse |
| Entrez | 400720 | n/a |
| Ensembl | ENSG00000197128 | n/a |
| UniProt | Q68DY9 | n/a |
| RefSeq (mRNA) | NM_001024596; NM_001144068; NM_001330613 | n/a |
| RefSeq (protein) | NP_001019767; NP_001137540; NP_001317542 | n/a |
| Location (UCSC) | Chr 19: 57.47 – 57.48 Mb | n/a |
| PubMed search | | n/a |
- Wikidata
| View/Edit Human |

Zinc finger protein 772 is a protein that in humans is encoded by the ZNF772 gene.
