= ZNF473 =

Protein-coding gene in the species Homo sapiens

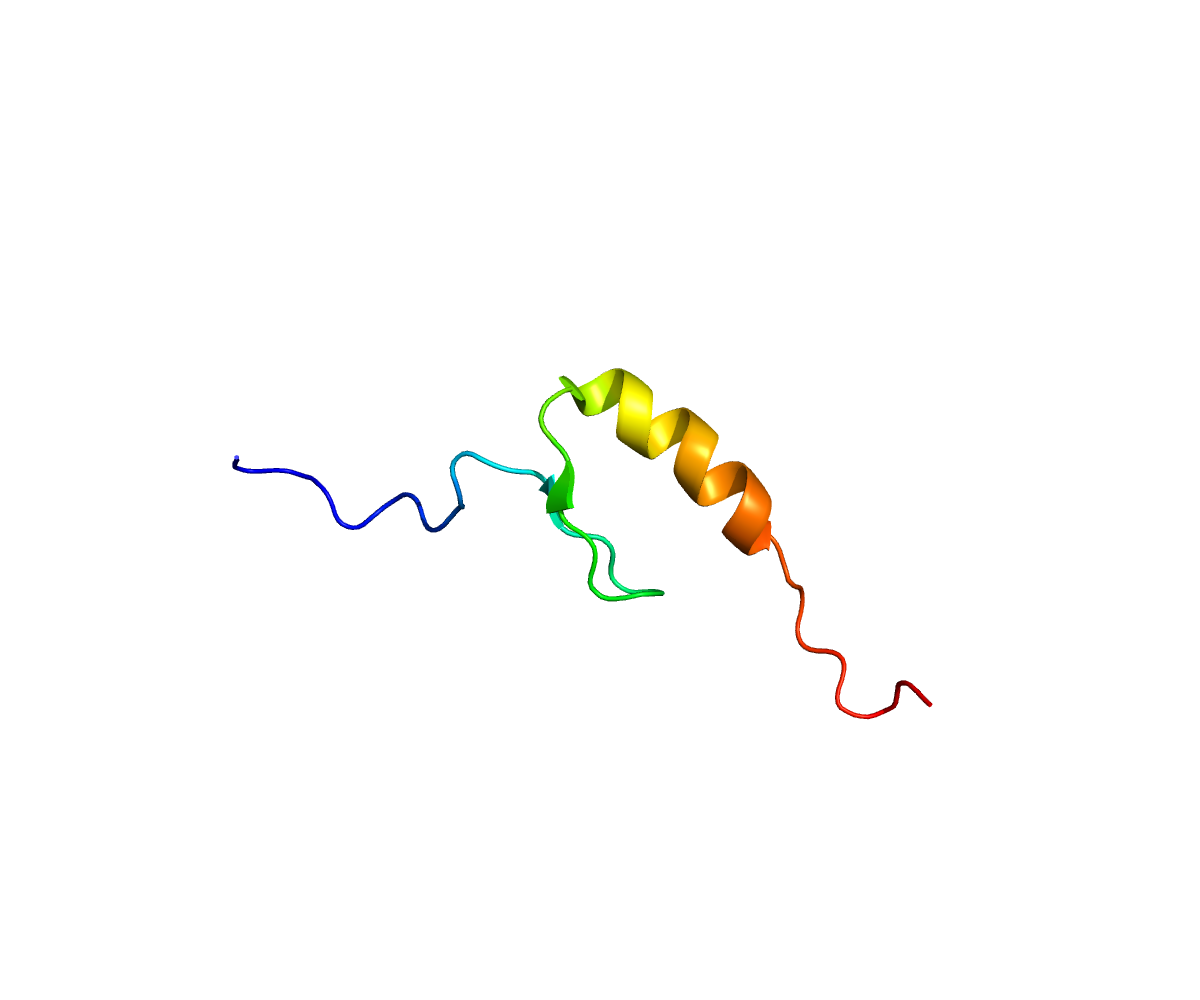

Identifiers
- Aliases: ZNF473, HZFP100, ZN473, zinc finger protein 473, ZFP100
- External IDs: OMIM: 617908; MGI: 2442697; GeneCards: ZNF473
Available structures
PDB	Ortholog search: PDBe RCSB
PDB	List of PDB id codes 2EMB, 2EMC, 2EME, 2EOU, 2EOX, 2EOY, 2EOZ, 2YRH, 2YRJ, 2YSV, 2YTD, 2YTE, 2YTT, 2YU5

Gene location (Human)
Chr.	Chromosome 19 (human)
Band	19q13.33	Start	50,025,714 bp
Band	19q13.33	End	50,053,414 bp

Gene location (Mouse)
Chr.	Chromosome 7 (mouse)
Band	7|7 B3	Start	44,380,904 bp
Band	7|7 B3	End	44,400,474 bp
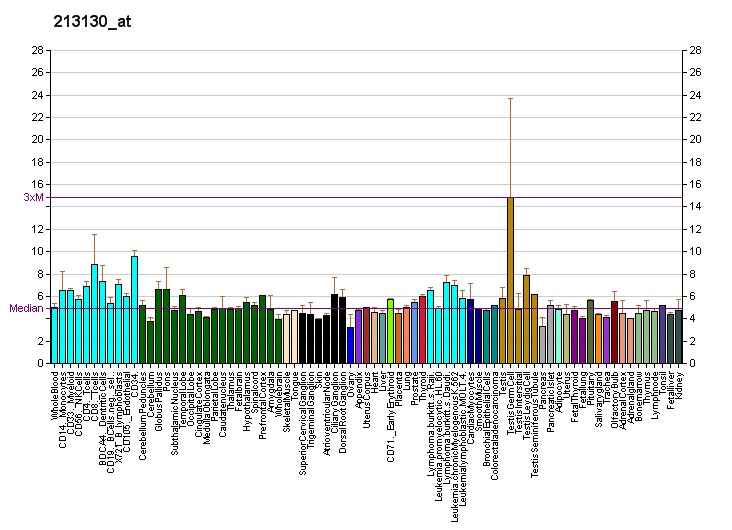

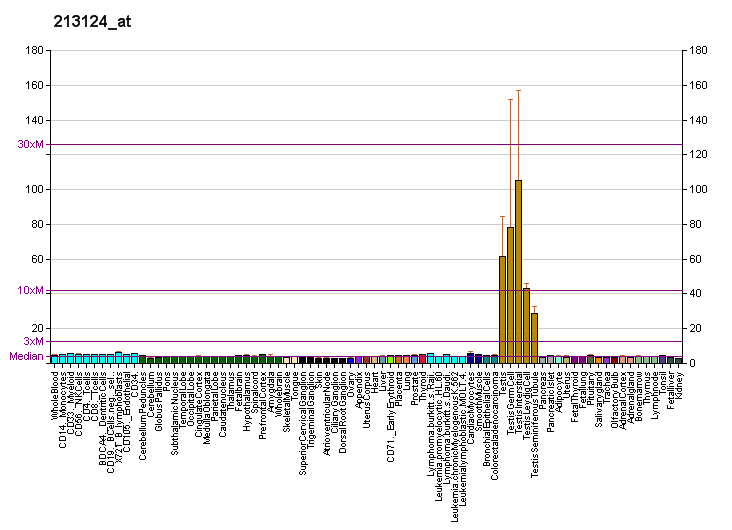
RNA expression pattern
Bgee	Human / Mouse (ortholog); Top expressed in: right uterine tube; testicle; right testis; left testis; gonad; olfactory zone of nasal mucosa; sperm; anterior pituitary; ventricular zone; islet of Langerhans / Top expressed in: primary oocyte; secondary oocyte; zygote; urethra; otic vesicle; male urethra; tail of embryo; spermatocyte; epiblast; primitive streak; More reference expression data
BioGPS	More reference expression data
Gene ontology
Molecular function	metal ion binding; DNA binding; nucleic acid binding; protein binding
Cellular component	Cajal body; nucleus; intracellular anatomical structure; nucleoplasm
Biological process	termination of RNA polymerase II transcription; mRNA 3'-end processing by stem-loop binding and cleavage; regulation of transcription, DNA-templated; histone mRNA metabolic process
Sources:Amigo / QuickGO
Orthologs
Databases	NCBI: entry; OMA: entry
Species	Human	Mouse
Entrez	25888	243963
Ensembl	ENSG00000142528	ENSMUSG00000048012
UniProt	Q8WTR7	Q8BI67
RefSeq (mRNA)	NM_001006656; NM_001308424; NM_015428	NM_001289836; NM_001289837; NM_001289838; NM_001289839; NM_178734
RefSeq (protein)	NP_001006657; NP_001295353; NP_056243	NP_001276765; NP_001276766; NP_001276767; NP_001276768; NP_848849
Location (UCSC)	Chr 19: 50.03 – 50.05 Mb	Chr 7: 44.38 – 44.4 Mb
PubMed search
- Wikidata
View/Edit Human	View/Edit Mouse

Zinc finger protein 473 is a protein that in humans is encoded by the ZNF473 gene.
