= TBCB =

Protein-coding gene in the species Homo sapiens

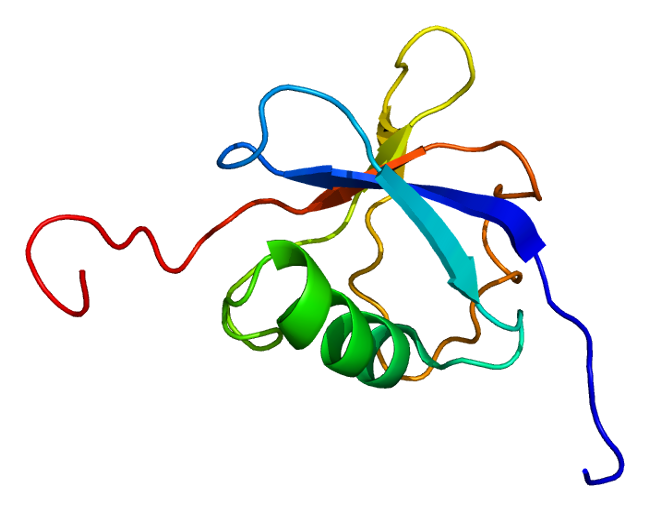
Available structures
PDB	Ortholog search: PDBe RCSB
PDB	List of PDB id codes 1V6E, 1WHG

Identifiers
- Aliases: TBCB, CG22, CKAP1, CKAPI, tubulin folding cofactor B
- External IDs: OMIM: 601303; MGI: 1913661; HomoloGene: 981; GeneCards: TBCB; OMA:TBCB - orthologs

Gene location (Human)
Chr.	Chromosome 19 (human)
Band	19q13.12	Start	36,114,289 bp
Band	19q13.12	End	36,125,947 bp

Gene location (Mouse)
Chr.	Chromosome 7 (mouse)
Band	7|7 B1	Start	29,923,556 bp
Band	7|7 B1	End	29,931,697 bp
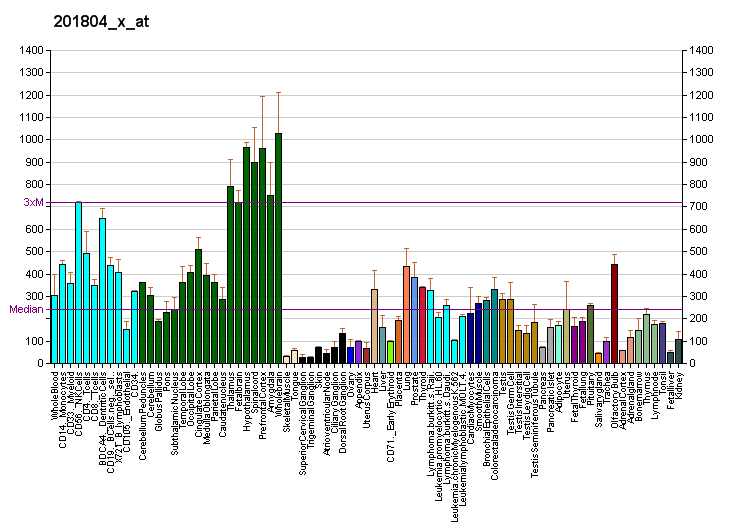

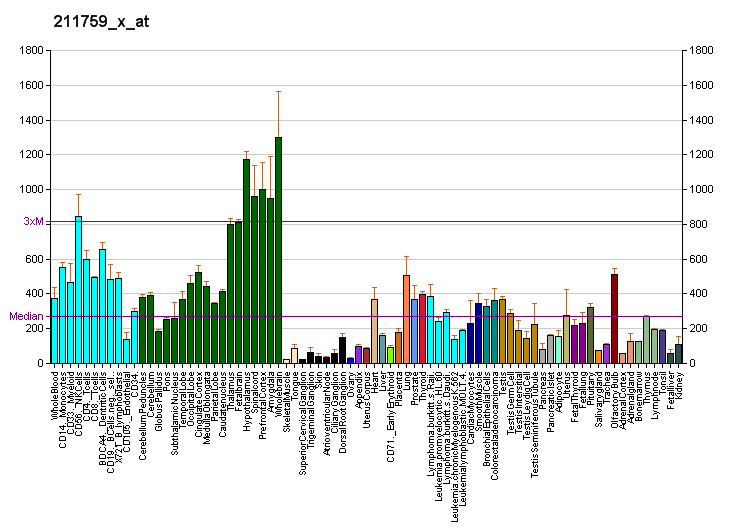

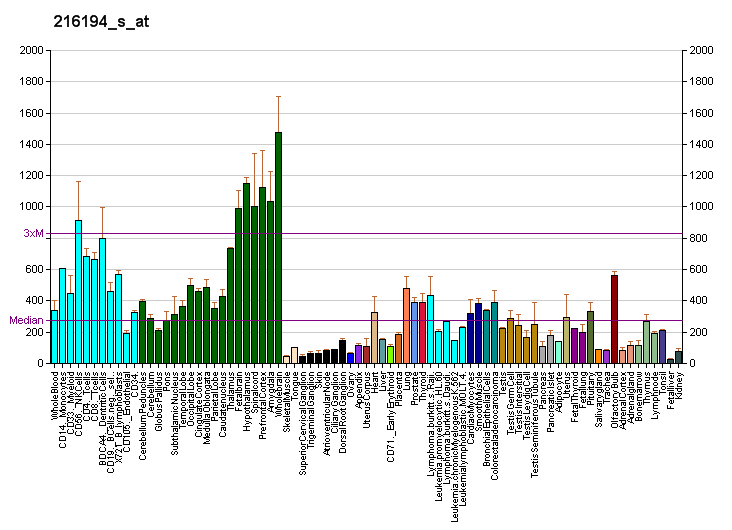
RNA expression pattern
Bgee	Human / Mouse (ortholog); Top expressed in: C1 segment; inferior ganglion of vagus nerve; pons; prefrontal cortex; middle frontal gyrus; inferior olivary nucleus; hypothalamus; substantia nigra; superior vestibular nucleus; thalamus / Top expressed in: facial motor nucleus; epithelium of lens; barrel cortex; anterior horn of spinal cord; superior cervical ganglion; motor neuron; medial ganglionic eminence; medullary collecting duct; maxillary prominence; mandibular prominence; More reference expression data
BioGPS	More reference expression data
Gene ontology
Molecular function	protein binding
Cellular component	cytoplasm; microtubule cytoskeleton; microtubule; cytoskeleton; cytosol
Biological process	multicellular organism development; cell differentiation; nervous system development
Sources:Amigo / QuickGO
Orthologs
Species	Human	Mouse
Entrez	1155	66411
Ensembl	ENSG00000105254	ENSMUSG00000006095
UniProt	Q99426	Q9D1E6
RefSeq (mRNA)	NM_001300971; NM_001281	NM_025548; NM_001360648; NM_001360649
RefSeq (protein)	NP_001272; NP_001287900	NP_079824; NP_001347577; NP_001347578
Location (UCSC)	Chr 19: 36.11 – 36.13 Mb	Chr 7: 29.92 – 29.93 Mb
PubMed search
- Wikidata
View/Edit Human	View/Edit Mouse

Tubulin-folding cofactor B is a protein that in humans is encoded by the TBCB gene.
