= Zinc finger protein 784 =

Protein found in humans

ZNF784

Identifiers
- Aliases: ZNF784, zinc finger protein 784
- External IDs: MGI: 3606042; GeneCards: ZNF784

Gene location (Human)
Chr.	Chromosome 19 (human)
Band	19q13.42	Start	55,620,741 bp
Band	19q13.42	End	55,624,566 bp

Gene location (Mouse)
Chr.	Chromosome 7 (mouse)
Band	7|7 A1	Start	5,037,438 bp
Band	7|7 A1	End	5,041,445 bp
RNA expression pattern
Bgee	Human / Mouse (ortholog); Top expressed in: muscle of thigh; apex of heart; gastrocnemius muscle; right uterine tube; Skeletal muscle tissue of biceps brachii; muscle layer of sigmoid colon; quadriceps femoris muscle; left ventricle; vastus lateralis muscle; tibial arteries / Top expressed in: otic vesicle; zygote; right kidney; proximal tubule; neural layer of retina; autopod region; foot; embryo; ankle; granulocyte; More reference expression data
BioGPS	n/a
Gene ontology
Molecular function	DNA binding; metal ion binding; nucleic acid binding; DNA-binding transcription factor activity, RNA polymerase II-specific; DNA-binding transcription factor activity; sequence-specific DNA binding
Cellular component	nucleus; nucleoplasm
Biological process	regulation of transcription, DNA-templated; hematopoietic progenitor cell differentiation; transcription, DNA-templated; regulation of transcription by RNA polymerase II; negative regulation of transcription, DNA-templated; positive regulation of transcription, DNA-templated; positive regulation of transcription by RNA polymerase II
Sources:Amigo / QuickGO
Orthologs
Databases	NCBI: entry; OMA: entry
Species	Human	Mouse
Entrez	147808	654801
Ensembl	ENSG00000179922	ENSMUSG00000043290
UniProt	Q8NCA9	Q8BI69
RefSeq (mRNA)	NM_203374	NM_001039532
RefSeq (protein)	NP_976308	NP_001034621
Location (UCSC)	Chr 19: 55.62 – 55.62 Mb	Chr 7: 5.04 – 5.04 Mb
PubMed search
- Wikidata
View/Edit Human	View/Edit Mouse

Zinc finger protein 784 is a protein that in humans is encoded by the ZNF784 gene.
