= ZNF444 =

Protein-coding gene in the species Homo sapiens

Identifiers
- Aliases: ZNF444, EZF-2, EZF2, ZSCAN17, zinc finger protein 444
- External IDs: OMIM: 607874; MGI: 1923365; GeneCards: ZNF444

Gene location (Human)
Chr.	Chromosome 19 (human)
Band	19q13.43	Start	56,132,599 bp
Band	19q13.43	End	56,160,893 bp

Gene location (Mouse)
Chr.	Chromosome 7 (mouse)
Band	7|7 A1	Start	6,175,225 bp
Band	7|7 A1	End	6,196,810 bp
RNA expression pattern
Bgee	Human / Mouse (ortholog); Top expressed in: beta cell; olfactory bulb; vena cava; right uterine tube; right lobe of liver; cerebellar vermis; body of pancreas; thoracic diaphragm; cingulate gyrus; anterior cingulate cortex / Top expressed in: neural layer of retina; right kidney; yolk sac; spermatocyte; ventricular zone; superior frontal gyrus; primary visual cortex; embryo; dentate gyrus of hippocampal formation granule cell; proximal tubule; More reference expression data
BioGPS	n/a
Gene ontology
Molecular function	nucleic acid binding; metal ion binding; DNA-binding transcription factor activity; DNA binding; DNA-binding transcription factor activity, RNA polymerase II-specific
Cellular component	nucleus
Biological process	regulation of transcription, DNA-templated; transcription, DNA-templated; regulation of transcription by RNA polymerase II; positive regulation of transcription, DNA-templated
Sources:Amigo / QuickGO
Orthologs
Databases	NCBI: entry; OMA: entry
Species	Human	Mouse
Entrez	55311	72667
Ensembl	ENSG00000167685	ENSMUSG00000044876
UniProt	Q8N0Y2	n/a
RefSeq (mRNA)	NM_001253792; NM_018337	NM_001146024; NM_028316
RefSeq (protein)	NP_001240721; NP_060807; NP_001240721.1	n/a
Location (UCSC)	Chr 19: 56.13 – 56.16 Mb	Chr 7: 6.18 – 6.2 Mb
PubMed search
- Wikidata
View/Edit Human	View/Edit Mouse

Zinc finger protein 444 is a protein that in humans is encoded by the ZNF444 gene.

== Function ==
This gene encodes a zinc finger protein which activates transcription of a scavenger receptor gene involved in the degradation of acetylated low-density lipoprotein (Ac-LDL) (Adachi H, Tsujimoto M (2002). "Characterization of the human gene encoding the scavenger receptor expressed by endothelial cell and its regulation by a novel transcription factor, endothelial zinc finger protein-2". J Biol Chem. 277 (27): 24014–21. doi:10.1074/jbc.M201854200. PMID 11978792.). This gene is located in a cluster of zinc finger genes on chromosome 19 at q13.4. A pseudogene of this gene is located on chromosome 15. Multiple transcript variants encoding different isoforms have been found for this gene.
