= Zinc finger protein 749 =

Protein found in humans

ZNF749

Identifiers
- Aliases: ZNF749, zinc finger protein 749
- External IDs: GeneCards: ZNF749

Gene location (Human)
| Chr. | Chromosome 19 (human) |
| Band | 19q13.43 | Start | 57,435,325 bp |
| Band | 19q13.43 | End | 57,447,101 bp |
RNA expression pattern
| Bgee | Human / Mouse (ortholog); Top expressed in: mucosa of transverse colon; gonad; testicle; right uterine tube; stromal cell of endometrium; muscle of thigh; left adrenal cortex; gastrocnemius muscle; prefrontal cortex; skin of abdomen / n/a; More reference expression data |
| BioGPS | n/a |
Gene ontology
| Molecular function | DNA binding; metal ion binding; nucleic acid binding; DNA-binding transcription factor activity, RNA polymerase II-specific |
| Cellular component | intracellular anatomical structure; nucleus |
| Biological process | regulation of transcription, DNA-templated; transcription, DNA-templated; regulation of transcription by RNA polymerase II |
Sources:Amigo / QuickGO
Orthologs
| Databases | NCBI: entry; OMA: entry |
| Species | Human | Mouse |
| Entrez | 388567 | n/a |
| Ensembl | ENSG00000186230 | n/a |
| UniProt | O43361 | n/a |
| RefSeq (mRNA) | NM_001023561; NM_001321952; NM_001321953; NM_001321954 | n/a |
| RefSeq (protein) | NP_001018855; NP_001308881; NP_001308882; NP_001308883 | n/a |
| Location (UCSC) | Chr 19: 57.44 – 57.45 Mb | n/a |
| PubMed search | | n/a |
- Wikidata
| View/Edit Human |

Zinc finger protein 749 is a protein that in humans is encoded by the ZNF749 gene.
