= PNMA8A =

Protein-coding gene in the species Homo sapiens

Identifiers
- Aliases: PNMA8A, PNMAL1, FLJ10781, paraneoplastic Ma antigen family member 8A, PNMA family member 8A
- External IDs: MGI: 1918941; GeneCards: PNMA8A

Gene location (Human)
Chr.	Chromosome 19 (human)
Band	19q13.32	Start	46,466,491 bp
Band	19q13.32	End	46,471,563 bp

Gene location (Mouse)
Chr.	Chromosome 7 (mouse)
Band	7|7 A2	Start	16,693,604 bp
Band	7|7 A2	End	16,698,532 bp
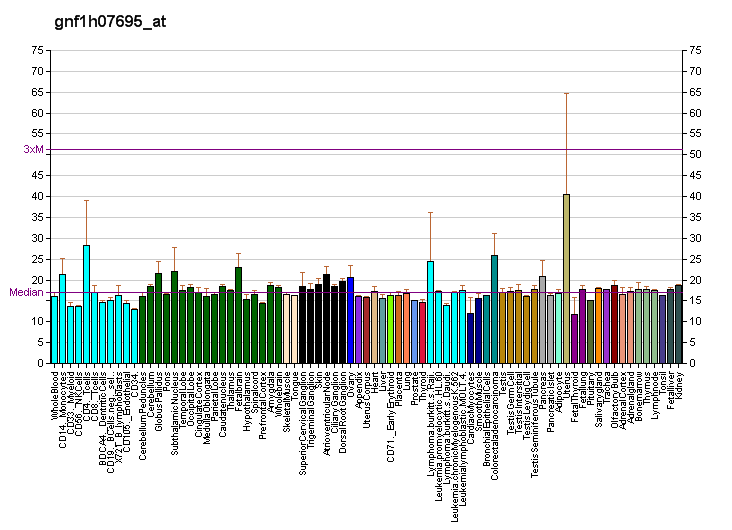

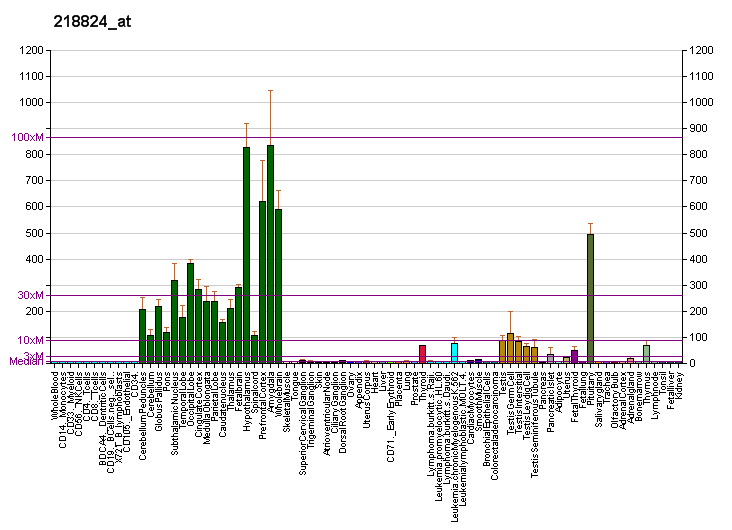

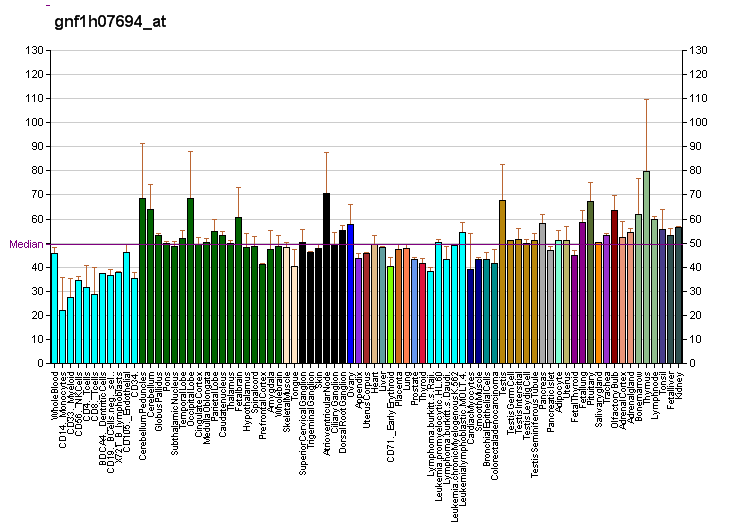
RNA expression pattern
Bgee	Human / Mouse (ortholog); Top expressed in: endothelial cell; middle temporal gyrus; cerebellar vermis; pons; Brodmann area 23; orbitofrontal cortex; superior frontal gyrus; parietal lobe; superior vestibular nucleus; postcentral gyrus / Top expressed in: Region I of hippocampus proper; nucleus of stria terminalis; ventromedial nucleus; supraoptic nucleus; arcuate nucleus; amygdala; substantia nigra; paraventricular nucleus of hypothalamus; nucleus accumbens; anterior amygdaloid area; More reference expression data
BioGPS	More reference expression data
Orthologs
Databases	NCBI: entry; OMA: entry
Species	Human	Mouse
Entrez	55228	71691
Ensembl	ENSG00000182013	ENSMUSG00000041141
UniProt	Q86V59	Q80VM8
RefSeq (mRNA)	NM_001103149; NM_018215	NM_001007569
RefSeq (protein)	NP_001096619; NP_060685	NP_001007570
Location (UCSC)	Chr 19: 46.47 – 46.47 Mb	Chr 7: 16.69 – 16.7 Mb
PubMed search
- Wikidata
View/Edit Human	View/Edit Mouse

PNMA-like protein 1, or paraneoplastic Ma antigen family member 8A is a protein that in humans is encoded by the PNMAL1 gene.
