= Zinc finger protein 541 =

Protein found in humans

ZNF541

Identifiers
- Aliases: ZNF541, zinc finger protein 541
- External IDs: MGI: 3647699; GeneCards: ZNF541

Gene location (Human)
Chr.	Chromosome 19 (human)
Band	19q13.33	Start	47,520,690 bp
Band	19q13.33	End	47,573,148 bp

Gene location (Mouse)
Chr.	Chromosome 7 (mouse)
Band	7|7 A2	Start	15,795,739 bp
Band	7|7 A2	End	15,830,259 bp
RNA expression pattern
Bgee	Human / Mouse (ortholog); Top expressed in: left testis; right testis; testicle; gonad; left adrenal cortex; right adrenal cortex; endothelial cell; tibialis anterior muscle; left ovary; Achilles tendon / Top expressed in: seminiferous tubule; spermatid; spermatocyte; secondary oocyte; primary oocyte; zygote; granulocyte; ovary; neural layer of retina; Gonadal ridge; More reference expression data
BioGPS	n/a
Gene ontology
Molecular function	DNA binding; metal ion binding; nucleic acid binding; DNA-binding transcription factor activity; transcription factor binding; DNA-binding transcription factor activity, RNA polymerase II-specific
Cellular component	transcription regulator complex; nucleus; histone deacetylase complex
Biological process	multicellular organism development; cell differentiation; regulation of transcription, DNA-templated; transcription, DNA-templated; spermatogenesis; regulation of transcription by RNA polymerase II
Sources:Amigo / QuickGO
Orthologs
Databases	NCBI: entry; OMA: entry
Species	Human	Mouse
Entrez	84215	666528
Ensembl	ENSG00000118156	ENSMUSG00000078796
UniProt	Q9H0D2	Q0GGX2
RefSeq (mRNA)	NM_001101419; NM_001277075; NM_032255	NM_001099277; NM_001347559
RefSeq (protein)	NP_001264004	NP_001092747; NP_001334488
Location (UCSC)	Chr 19: 47.52 – 47.57 Mb	Chr 7: 15.8 – 15.83 Mb
PubMed search
- Wikidata
View/Edit Human	View/Edit Mouse

Zinc finger protein 541 is a protein that in humans is encoded by the ZNF541 gene.
