= RFPL4A =

Protein-coding gene in the species Homo sapiens

Identifiers
- Aliases: RFPL4A, RFPL4, RNF210, ret finger protein like 4A
- External IDs: OMIM: 612601; MGI: 2149590; GeneCards: RFPL4A
Available structures
PDB	Ortholog search: PDBe RCSB
PDB	List of PDB id codes 2FBE

Gene location (Human)
Chr.	Chromosome 19 (human)
Band	19q13.42	Start	55,759,097 bp
Band	19q13.42	End	55,763,421 bp

Gene location (Mouse)
Chr.	Chromosome 7 (mouse)
Band	7 A1|7 2.96 cM	Start	5,112,786 bp
Band	7 A1|7 2.96 cM	End	5,119,949 bp
RNA expression pattern
Bgee	Human / Mouse (ortholog); Top expressed in: gonad; testicle; right lobe of liver; granulocyte; appendix; monocyte; lymph node; right testis; left testis; smooth muscle tissue / Top expressed in: zygote; secondary oocyte; primary oocyte; morula; embryo; blastocyst; ovary; diencephalon; ureter; pituitary gland; More reference expression data
BioGPS	n/a
Orthologs
Databases	NCBI: entry; OMA: entry
Species	Human	Mouse
Entrez	342931	192658
Ensembl	ENSG00000223638	ENSMUSG00000035191
UniProt	A6NLU0	Q8VH31
RefSeq (mRNA)	NM_001145014	NM_001145013; NM_138954
RefSeq (protein)	NP_001138486	NP_001138485; NP_620404
Location (UCSC)	Chr 19: 55.76 – 55.76 Mb	Chr 7: 5.11 – 5.12 Mb
PubMed search
- Wikidata
View/Edit Human	View/Edit Mouse

Ret finger protein like 4A is a protein that in humans is encoded by the RFPL4A gene.
