= Zinc finger protein 121 =

Protein found in humans

ZNF121

Identifiers
- Aliases: ZNF121, D19S204, ZHC32, ZNF20, zinc finger protein 121
- External IDs: OMIM: 194628; GeneCards: ZNF121

Gene location (Human)
Chr.	Chromosome 19 (human)
Band	19p13.2	Start	9,560,329 bp
Band	19p13.2	End	9,584,504 bp
RNA expression pattern
Bgee	Human / Mouse (ortholog); Top expressed in: skin of hip; gums; gingival epithelium; parietal pleura; mucosa of sigmoid colon; skin of thigh; palpebral conjunctiva; germinal epithelium; thymus; visceral pleura / n/a; More reference expression data
BioGPS	n/a
Gene ontology
Molecular function	DNA binding; nucleic acid binding; metal ion binding; DNA-binding transcription factor activity; DNA-binding transcription factor activity, RNA polymerase II-specific
Cellular component	nucleus
Biological process	transcription, DNA-templated; regulation of transcription, DNA-templated; regulation of transcription by RNA polymerase II
Sources:Amigo / QuickGO
Orthologs
Databases	NCBI: entry; OMA: entry
Species	Human	Mouse
Entrez	7675	n/a
Ensembl	ENSG00000197961	n/a
UniProt	P58317	n/a
RefSeq (mRNA)	NM_001008727; NM_001308269	n/a
RefSeq (protein)	NP_001008727; NP_001295198	n/a
Location (UCSC)	Chr 19: 9.56 – 9.58 Mb	n/a
PubMed search		n/a
- Wikidata
View/Edit Human

Zinc finger protein 121 is a protein that in humans is encoded by the ZNF121 gene.
