= ZNF320 =

Human protein-coding gene

Identifiers
- Aliases: ZNF320, ZFPL, zinc finger protein 320
- External IDs: OMIM: 606427; GeneCards: ZNF320

Gene location (Human)
Chr.	Chromosome 19 (human)
Band	19q13.41	Start	52,863,790 bp
Band	19q13.41	End	52,897,693 bp
RNA expression pattern
Bgee	Human / Mouse (ortholog); Top expressed in: buccal mucosa cell; pancreatic ductal cell; tendon of biceps brachii; endometrium; right uterine tube; germinal epithelium; ganglionic eminence; endothelial cell; right hemisphere of cerebellum; epithelium of colon / n/a; More reference expression data
BioGPS	n/a
Gene ontology
Molecular function	DNA-binding transcription factor activity; DNA binding; protein binding; metal ion binding; nucleic acid binding; DNA-binding transcription factor activity, RNA polymerase II-specific
Cellular component	intracellular anatomical structure; nucleus
Biological process	regulation of transcription, DNA-templated; transcription, DNA-templated; regulation of transcription by RNA polymerase II
Sources:Amigo / QuickGO
Orthologs
Databases	NCBI: entry; OMA: entry
Species	Human	Mouse
Entrez	162967	n/a
Ensembl	ENSG00000182986	n/a
UniProt	A2RRD8; M0R0Z8	n/a
RefSeq (mRNA)	NM_207333; NM_001351773; NM_001351774; NM_001351775; NM_001351776 NM_001351777	n/a
RefSeq (protein)	NP_997216; NP_001338702; NP_001338703; NP_001338704; NP_001338705 NP_001338706	n/a
Location (UCSC)	Chr 19: 52.86 – 52.9 Mb	n/a
PubMed search		n/a
- Wikidata
View/Edit Human

Zinc finger protein 320 is a protein that in humans is encoded by the ZNF320 gene.

== Function ==
ZNF320 encodes a Kruppel-like zinc finger protein. Members of this protein family are involved in activation or repression of transcription.
