= ZNF676 =

Protein-coding gene in the species Homo sapiens

Identifiers
- Aliases: ZNF676, zinc finger protein 676
- External IDs: MGI: 3036278; GeneCards: ZNF676

Gene location (Human)
Chr.	Chromosome 19 (human)
Band	19p12	Start	22,179,089 bp
Band	19p12	End	22,215,801 bp

Gene location (Mouse)
Chr.	Chromosome 13 (mouse)
Band	13|13 B3	Start	67,961,859 bp
Band	13|13 B3	End	67,975,121 bp
RNA expression pattern
Bgee	Human / Mouse (ortholog); Top expressed in: gonad; testicle; thyroid gland; left lobe of thyroid gland; right uterine tube; right lobe of thyroid gland; smooth muscle tissue; islet of Langerhans; left coronary artery; left ventricle / Top expressed in: ganglionic eminence; ventricular zone; mesencephalon; neural tube; genital tubercle; proximal tubule; tail of embryo; right kidney; secondary oocyte; liver; More reference expression data
BioGPS	n/a
Gene ontology
Molecular function	DNA binding; metal ion binding; nucleic acid binding; DNA-binding transcription factor activity, RNA polymerase II-specific
Cellular component	intracellular anatomical structure; nucleus
Biological process	transcription, DNA-templated; regulation of transcription, DNA-templated; regulation of transcription by RNA polymerase II
Sources:Amigo / QuickGO
Orthologs
Databases	NCBI: entry; OMA: entry
Species	Human	Mouse
Entrez	163223	212569
Ensembl	ENSG00000276219; ENSG00000196109	ENSMUSG00000030446
UniProt	Q8N7Q3	n/a
RefSeq (mRNA)	NM_001001411	NM_198322
RefSeq (protein)	NP_001001411	n/a
Location (UCSC)	Chr 19: 22.18 – 22.22 Mb	Chr 13: 67.96 – 67.98 Mb
PubMed search
- Wikidata
View/Edit Human	View/Edit Mouse

Zinc finger protein 676 is a protein in humans that is encoded by the ZNF676 gene.
