= LRRC25 =

Protein-coding gene in the species Homo sapiens

Identifiers
- Aliases: LRRC25, MAPA, leucine rich repeat containing 25
- External IDs: OMIM: 607518; MGI: 2445284; HomoloGene: 51663; GeneCards: LRRC25; OMA:LRRC25 - orthologs

Gene location (Human)
Chr.	Chromosome 19 (human)
Band	19p13.11	Start	18,391,137 bp
Band	19p13.11	End	18,397,622 bp

Gene location (Mouse)
Chr.	Chromosome 8 (mouse)
Band	8|8 B3.3	Start	71,068,805 bp
Band	8|8 B3.3	End	71,074,133 bp
RNA expression pattern
Bgee	Human / Mouse (ortholog); Top expressed in: monocyte; granulocyte; blood; spleen; superficial temporal artery; appendix; germinal epithelium; bone marrow; bone marrow cell; left adrenal gland / Top expressed in: granulocyte; spleen; bone marrow; white adipose tissue; jejunum; ileum; liver; quadriceps femoris muscle; zone of skin; colon; More reference expression data
BioGPS	n/a
Orthologs
Species	Human	Mouse
Entrez	126364	211228
Ensembl	ENSG00000175489	ENSMUSG00000049988
UniProt	Q8N386	Q8K1T1
RefSeq (mRNA)	NM_145256	NM_153074
RefSeq (protein)	NP_660299	NP_694714
Location (UCSC)	Chr 19: 18.39 – 18.4 Mb	Chr 8: 71.07 – 71.07 Mb
PubMed search
- Wikidata
View/Edit Human	View/Edit Mouse

Leucine rich repeat containing 25 is a protein that in humans is encoded by the LRRC25 gene.
