= MZF1-AS1 =

Non-coding RNA in the species Homo sapiens

Identifiers
- Aliases: MZF1-AS1, MZF1 antisense RNA 1
- External IDs: GeneCards: MZF1-AS1

Gene location (Human)
| Chr. | Chromosome 19 (human) |
| Band | 19q13.43 | Start | 58,559,125 bp |
| Band | 19q13.43 | End | 58,574,797 bp |
RNA expression pattern
| Bgee | Human / Mouse (ortholog); Top expressed in: right uterine tube; sural nerve; right lobe of thyroid gland; right hemisphere of cerebellum; right adrenal gland; right adrenal cortex; left lobe of thyroid gland; stromal cell of endometrium; left adrenal cortex; body of stomach / n/a; More reference expression data |
| BioGPS | n/a |
Orthologs
| Databases | NCBI: entry; OMA: entry |
| Species | Human | Mouse |
| Entrez | 100131691 | n/a |
| Ensembl | ENSG00000267858 | n/a |
| UniProt | n a | n/a |
| RefSeq (mRNA) | n/a | n/a |
| RefSeq (protein) | n/a | n/a |
| Location (UCSC) | Chr 19: 58.56 – 58.57 Mb | n/a |
| PubMed search | | n/a |
- Wikidata
| View/Edit Human |

MZF1 antisense RNA 1 is a non-coding RNA that in humans is encoded by the MZF1-AS1 gene.
