= DPF1 =

Protein-coding gene in the species Homo sapiens

Identifiers
- Aliases: DPF1, BAF45b, NEUD4, neuro-d4, double PHD fingers 1, SMARCG1
- External IDs: OMIM: 601670; MGI: 1352748; GeneCards: DPF1

Gene location (Human)
Chr.	Chromosome 19 (human)
Band	19q13.2	Start	38,211,006 bp
Band	19q13.2	End	38,229,714 bp

Gene location (Mouse)
Chr.	Chromosome 7 (mouse)
Band	7|7 B1	Start	29,303,951 bp
Band	7|7 B1	End	29,318,243 bp
RNA expression pattern
Bgee	Human / Mouse (ortholog); Top expressed in: right frontal lobe; prefrontal cortex; cingulate gyrus; nucleus accumbens; anterior cingulate cortex; dorsolateral prefrontal cortex; Brodmann area 9; ganglionic eminence; Brodmann area 46; amygdala / Top expressed in: lateral septal nucleus; ganglionic eminence; superior frontal gyrus; dentate gyrus of hippocampal formation granule cell; primary visual cortex; olfactory tubercle; ventromedial nucleus; olfactory bulb; anterior amygdaloid area; medial ganglionic eminence; More reference expression data
BioGPS	n/a
Gene ontology
Molecular function	metal ion binding; zinc ion binding; histone acetyltransferase activity; histone binding; nucleic acid binding
Cellular component	cytoplasm; nBAF complex; nucleus; histone acetyltransferase complex
Biological process	regulation of transcription, DNA-templated; transcription, DNA-templated; nervous system development; apoptotic process; histone acetylation; negative regulation of transcription, DNA-templated; positive regulation of transcription by RNA polymerase II
Sources:Amigo / QuickGO
Orthologs
Databases	NCBI: entry; OMA: entry
Species	Human	Mouse
Entrez	8193	29861
Ensembl	ENSG00000011332	ENSMUSG00000030584
UniProt	Q92782; Q6PJ73	Q9QX66
RefSeq (mRNA)	NM_001135155; NM_001135156; NM_001289978; NM_004647; NM_001363579	NM_013874; NM_001368371
RefSeq (protein)	NP_001128627; NP_001128628; NP_001276907; NP_004638; NP_001350508 NP_001128628.1	NP_038902; NP_001355300; NP_001390134; NP_001390135; NP_001390136 NP_001390137; NP_001390138; NP_001390140; NP_001390141; NP_001390143; NP_001390144; NP_001390145; NP_001390146; NP_001390147; NP_001390148; NP_001390149; NP_001390139
Location (UCSC)	Chr 19: 38.21 – 38.23 Mb	Chr 7: 29.3 – 29.32 Mb
PubMed search
- Wikidata
View/Edit Human	View/Edit Mouse

D4, zinc and double PHD fingers family 1 is a protein that in humans is encoded by the DPF1 gene.
