= PDCD5 =

Protein-coding gene in the species Homo sapiens

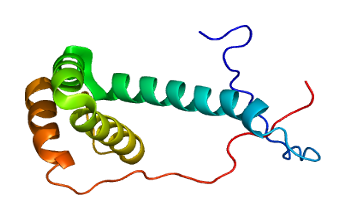

Identifiers
- Aliases: PDCD5, TFAR19, programmed cell death 5
- External IDs: OMIM: 604583; MGI: 3782009; GeneCards: PDCD5
Available structures
PDB	Ortholog search: PDBe RCSB
PDB	List of PDB id codes 1YYB, 2CRU, 2K6B

Gene location (Human)
Chr.	Chromosome 19 (human)
Band	19q13.11	Start	32,581,190 bp
Band	19q13.11	End	32,587,453 bp
RNA expression pattern
Bgee	Human / Mouse (ortholog); Top expressed in: right testis; left testis; body of pancreas; anterior pituitary; right auricle of heart; left coronary artery; muscle layer of sigmoid colon; gastric mucosa; apex of heart; anterior cingulate cortex / n/a; More reference expression data
BioGPS	n/a
Gene ontology
Molecular function	DNA binding; heparin binding; protein binding; acetyltransferase activator activity; beta-tubulin binding
Cellular component	cytoplasm; extracellular exosome; nucleus; cytosol
Biological process	cellular response to transforming growth factor beta stimulus; negative regulation of chaperone-mediated protein folding; positive regulation of release of cytochrome c from mitochondria; apoptotic process; positive regulation of cysteine-type endopeptidase activity involved in apoptotic process; positive regulation of gene expression; positive regulation of protein insertion into mitochondrial outer membrane; negative regulation of cell population proliferation; positive regulation of apoptotic process
Sources:Amigo / QuickGO
Orthologs
Databases	NCBI: entry; OMA: entry
Species	Human	Mouse
Entrez	9141	100042424
Ensembl	ENSG00000105185	n/a
UniProt	O14737	P56812
RefSeq (mRNA)	NM_004708	XM_001478256
RefSeq (protein)	NP_004699	NP_062720
Location (UCSC)	Chr 19: 32.58 – 32.59 Mb	n/a
PubMed search
- Wikidata
View/Edit Human	View/Edit Mouse

Programmed cell death protein 5 is a protein, originally identified as an apoptosis-accelerating protein, that in humans is encoded by the PDCD5 gene.

This gene encodes a protein expressed in tumor cells during apoptosis independent of the apoptosis-inducing stimuli. Prior to apoptosis induction, this gene product is distributed in both the nucleus and cytoplasm.

Once apoptosis is induced, the level of this protein increases and by relocation from the cytoplasm, it accumulates in the nucleus. Although its exact function is not defined, this protein is thought to play an early and universal role in apoptosis.
