= PGK1P2 =

Pseudogene in the species Homo sapiens

Identifiers
- Aliases: PGK1P2, PGK2, phosphoglycerate kinase 1, pseudogene 2
- External IDs: GeneCards: PGK1P2; OMA:PGK1P2 - orthologs

Gene location (Human)
Chr.	Chromosome 19 (human)
Band	19p13.2	Start	12,559,571 bp
Band	19p13.2	End	12,561,105 bp
RNA expression pattern
Bgee	Human / Mouse (ortholog); Top expressed in: gonad; testicle; apex of heart; stromal cell of endometrium; muscle of thigh; right uterine tube; granulocyte; primary visual cortex; left ventricle; gastric mucosa / n/a; More reference expression data
BioGPS	n/a
Orthologs
Species	Human	Mouse
Entrez	5233	n/a
Ensembl	ENSG00000213290	n/a
UniProt	n a	n/a
RefSeq (mRNA)	n/a	n/a
RefSeq (protein)	n/a	n/a
Location (UCSC)	Chr 19: 12.56 – 12.56 Mb	n/a
PubMed search		n/a
- Wikidata
View/Edit Human

Phosphoglycerate kinase 1, pseudogene 2 is a protein that in humans is encoded by the PGK1P2 gene.
