= ZNF571 =

Protein-coding gene in the species Homo sapiens

Identifiers
- Aliases: ZNF571, HSPC059, zinc finger protein 571
- External IDs: GeneCards: ZNF571

Gene location (Human)
Chr.	Chromosome 19 (human)
Band	19q13.12	Start	37,554,782 bp
Band	19q13.12	End	37,594,792 bp
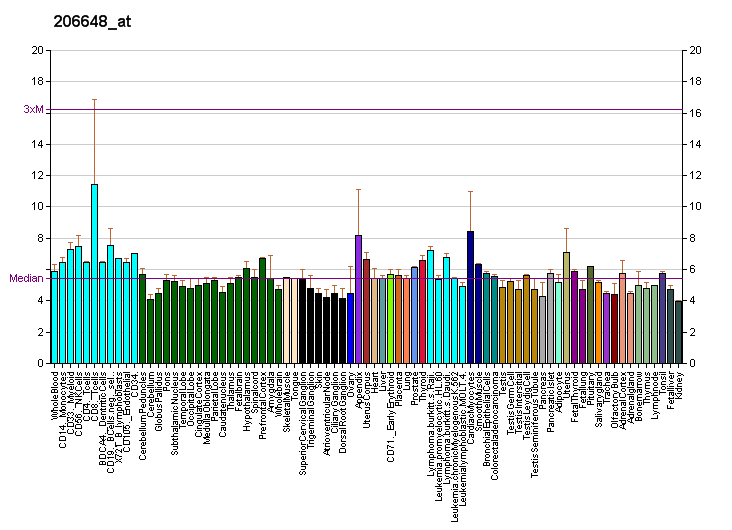
RNA expression pattern
Bgee	Human / Mouse (ortholog); Top expressed in: secondary oocyte; gonad; right lobe of thyroid gland; left lobe of thyroid gland; testicle; sural nerve; ganglionic eminence; Achilles tendon; right testis; C1 segment / n/a; More reference expression data
BioGPS	More reference expression data
Gene ontology
Molecular function	DNA-binding transcription factor activity; DNA binding; metal ion binding; nucleic acid binding
Cellular component	intracellular anatomical structure; nucleus
Biological process	regulation of transcription, DNA-templated; transcription, DNA-templated
Sources:Amigo / QuickGO
Orthologs
Databases	NCBI: entry; OMA: entry
Species	Human	Mouse
Entrez	51276	n/a
Ensembl	ENSG00000180479	n/a
UniProt	Q7Z3V5	n/a
RefSeq (mRNA)	NM_001290314; NM_016536; NM_001321272	n/a
RefSeq (protein)	NP_001277243; NP_001308201; NP_057620; NP_001277243.1; NP_057620.3 NP_001308201.1	n/a
Location (UCSC)	Chr 19: 37.55 – 37.59 Mb	n/a
PubMed search		n/a
- Wikidata
View/Edit Human

Zinc finger protein 571 is a protein that in humans is encoded by the ZNF571 gene.
