= CXB3S =

Protein-coding gene in humans

Identifiers
- Aliases: CXB3S, CB3S, coxsackie virus B3 sensitivity
- External IDs: GeneCards: CXB3S; OMA:CXB3S - orthologs
Orthologs
| Species | Human | Mouse |
| Entrez | 1526 | n/a |
| Ensembl | n/a | n/a |
| UniProt | n a | n/a |
| RefSeq (mRNA) | n/a | n/a |
| RefSeq (protein) | n/a | n/a |
| Location (UCSC) | n/a | n/a |
| PubMed search | | n/a |
- Wikidata
| View/Edit Human |

Coxsackie virus B3 sensitivity is a protein that is encoded by the CXB3S gene in human beings.

Its lineage is: Catarrhini, Chordata, Craniata, Euarchontoglires, Eukaryota; Euteleostomi, Eutheri and others.
