= Zinc finger protein 112 =

Protein found in humans

ZNF112

Identifiers
- Aliases: ZNF112, ZFP112, ZNF228, zinc finger protein 112
- External IDs: OMIM: 603994; MGI: 1929115; GeneCards: ZNF112

Gene location (Mouse)
Chr.	Chromosome 7 (mouse)
Band	7|7 A3	Start	24,112,314 bp
Band	7|7 A3	End	24,127,952 bp
Gene ontology
Molecular function	DNA-binding transcription factor activity; DNA binding; metal ion binding; nucleic acid binding
Cellular component	intracellular anatomical structure; nucleus
Biological process	regulation of transcription, DNA-templated; transcription, DNA-templated
Sources:Amigo / QuickGO
Orthologs
Databases	NCBI: entry; OMA: entry
Species	Human	Mouse
Entrez	7771	57745
Ensembl	ENSG00000062370	ENSMUSG00000052675
UniProt	Q9UJU3	Q0VAW7
RefSeq (mRNA)	NM_013380; NM_001083335	NM_021307
RefSeq (protein)	NP_001076804; NP_037512; NP_001335210; NP_001335211; NP_001335212 NP_001335213; NP_001335214	NP_067282
Location (UCSC)	n/a	Chr 7: 24.11 – 24.13 Mb
PubMed search
- Wikidata
View/Edit Human	View/Edit Mouse

Zinc finger protein 112 is a protein that in humans is encoded by the ZNF112 gene.
