= AAVS1 =

Gene in humans

Identifiers
- Aliases: AAVS1, AAV, adeno-associated virus integration site 1
- External IDs: GeneCards: AAVS1; OMA:AAVS1 - orthologs
Orthologs
Species	Human	Mouse
Entrez	17	n/a
Ensembl	n/a	n/a
UniProt	n a	n/a
RefSeq (mRNA)	n/a	n/a
RefSeq (protein)	n/a	n/a
Location (UCSC)	n/a	n/a
PubMed search		n/a
- Wikidata
View/Edit Human

Adeno-associated virus integration site 1 is a viral integration site that in humans is encoded by the AAVS1 gene located on chromosome 19.
