= List of diseases (N) =

This is a list of diseases starting with the letter "N".

== N–Nas ==
- N acetyltransferase deficiency
- N syndrome
- N-Acetylglutamate synthase deficiency
- N-acetyl-alpha-D-galactosaminidase
- N-acetyl-glucosamine-6-sulfate sulfatase deficiency
- NADH CoQ reductase, deficiency of
- NADH cytochrome B5 reductase deficiency
- Naegeli–Franceschetti–Jadassohn syndrome
- Naguib syndrome
- Nail–patella syndrome
- Nakajo–Nishimura syndrome
- Nakajo syndrome
- Nakamura–Osame syndrome
- NAME syndrome
- Nance–Horan syndrome
- Nanism due to growth hormone combined deficiency
- Nanism due to growth hormone isolated deficiency with X-linked hypogammaglobulinemia
- Nanism due to growth hormone resistance
- Narcissistic personality disorder
- Narcolepsy
  - Narcolepsy-Cataplexy
- Narrow oral fissure short stature cone shaped epiphyses
- Nasodigitoacoustic syndrome
- Nasopalpebral lipoma coloboma syndrome
- Nasopharyngeal carcinoma
- Nasopharyngeal teratoma Dandy–Walker diaphragmatic hernia
- Nasopharyngitis

== Nat–Nav ==
- Natal teeth intestinal pseudoobstruction patent ductus
- Nathalie syndrome
- Native American myopathy
- Navajo poikiloderma
- Naxos disease

== Ne ==
=== Nec–Neo ===
- Necrotizing arteriolitis
- Necrotizing encephalopathy, infantile subacute
- Necrotizing enterocolitis
- Necrotizing fasciitis
- Necrotizing pneumonia
- Negative rheumatoid factor polyarthritis
- Neisseria meningitidis
- Nelson syndrome
- Nemaline myopathy
  - Nemaline myopathy, type 1
  - Nemaline myopathy, type 2
  - Nemaline myopathy, type 3
  - Nemaline myopathy, type 4
  - Nemaline myopathy, type 5
- Neonatal diabetes mellitus
  - Neonatal diabetes mellitus, permanent (PNDM)
  - Neonatal diabetes mellitus, transient (TNDM)
- Neonatal hemochromatosis
- Neonatal hepatitis
- Neonatal infection
- Neonatal herpes
- Neonatal ovarian cyst
- Neonatal transient jaundice

=== Nep–Net ===
- Nephroblastomatosis, fetal ascites, macrosomia and Wilms' tumor
- Nephrocalcinosis
- Nephrogenic diabetes insipidus
- Nephrolithiasis type 2
- Nephronophthisis familial adult spastic quadriparesis
- Nephropathy deafness hyperparathyroidism
- Nephropathy familial with hyperuricemia
- Nephropathy, familial with gout
- Nephrosclerosis
- Nephrosis deafness urinary tract digital malformation
- Nephrosis neuronal dysmigration syndrome
- Nephrotic syndrome
- Nephrotic syndrome ocular anomalies
- Nephrotic syndrome, idiopathic, steroid-resistant
- Nerve sheath neoplasm
- Nesidioblastosis of pancreas
- Netherton syndrome ichthyosis

=== Neu ===
- Neu Laxova syndrome

==== Neuh ====
- Neuhauser–Daly–Magnelli syndrome
- Neuhauser–Eichner–Opitz syndrome

==== Neur ====
===== Neura–Neuri =====
- Neural crest tumor
- Neural tube defect, folate-sensitive
- Neural tube defects X linked
- Neuraminidase beta-galactosidase deficiency
- Neuraminidase deficiency
- Neurasthenia
- Neurilemmomatosis
- Neuritis with brachial predilection

===== Neuro =====
====== Neuroa–Neurog ======
- Neuroacanthocytosis
- Neuroaxonal dystrophy renal tubular acidosis
- Neuroaxonal dystrophy, late infantile
- Neuroblastoma
- Neurocutaneous melanosis
- Neurocysticercosis
- Neuroectodermal endocrine syndrome
- Neuroectodermal tumors primitive
- Neuroendocrine cancer
- Neuroendocrine carcinoma of the cervix
- Neuroendocrine tumor
- Neuroepithelioma
- Neurofaciodigitorenal syndrome
- Neurofibrillary tangles
- Neurofibroma
- Neurofibromatosis
  - Neurofibromatosis type 2
  - Neurofibromatosis type 3
  - Neurofibromatosis type 6
  - Neurofibromatosis, familial intestinal
  - Neurofibromatosis, Type IV, of Riccardi
  - Neurofibromatosis-Noonan syndrome
- Neurofibrosarcoma
- Neurogenic hypertension

====== Neurol–Neurot ======
- Neuroleptic malignant syndrome
- Neuroma biliary tract
- Neuromyotonia
- Neuronal ceroid lipofuscinosis
- Neuronal heterotopia
- Neuronal interstitial dysplasia
- Neuronal intestinal pseudoobstruction
- Neuronal intranuclear hyaline inclusion disease
- Neuronal intranuclear inclusion disease
- Neuropathy ataxia and retinitis pigmentosa
- Neuropathy congenital sensory neurotrophic keratitis
- Neuropathy hereditary with liability to pressure palsies
- Neuropathy motor sensory type 2 deafness mental retardation
- Neuropathy sensory spastic paraplegia
- Neuropathy, hereditary motor and sensory, LOM type
- Neuropathy, hereditary sensory, type I
- Neuropathy, hereditary sensory, type II
- Neurosyphilis
- Neurotoxicity syndromes

==== Neut ====
- Neutral lipid storage myopathy
- Neutropenia intermittent
- Neutropenia monocytopenia deafness
- Neutropenia, severe chronic

=== Nev–Nez ===
- Nevi flammei, familial multiple
- Nevo syndrome
- Nevoid basal cell carcinoma syndrome
- Nevus of ota retinitis pigmentosa
- Nevus sebaceus of Jadassohn
- Nezelof syndrome

== Ni–Nm ==
- Nicolaides–Baraitser syndrome
- Nicotine withdrawal
- Niemann–Pick disease
  - Niemann–Pick C1 disease
  - Niemann–Pick C2 disease
  - Niemann–Pick disease, type C
  - Niemann-Pick disease type D
- Night blindness
  - Night blindness skeletal anomalies unusual facies
  - Night blindness, congenital stationary
- Nijmegen breakage syndrome
- Nivelon–Nivelon–Mabille syndrome
- NMDA receptor antagonist neurotoxicity (NAN)

== No ==
=== Noa–Nor ===
- Noah syndrome
- Noble–Bass–Sherman syndrome
- Nocardiosis
- Noise-induced hearing loss
- Noma
- Non-24-hour sleep–wake disorder
- Non functioning pancreatic endocrine tumor
- Nonallergic atopic dermatitis
- Non-Hodgkin lymphoma
- Noninsulin-dependent diabetes mellitus with deafness
- Nonketotic hyperglycinemia
- Non-lissencephalic cortical dysplasia
- Nonmedullary thyroid carcinoma, with cell oxyphilia
- Nonne–Milroy disease
- Non-small cell lung cancer
- Nonimmune hydrops fetalis
- Nonsyndromic hereditary hearing impairment
- Nonvenereal endemic syphilis
- Nonverbal learning disorder
- Noonan like syndrome
- Noonan syndrome
- Norman–Roberts lissencephaly syndrome
- Normokalemic periodic paralysis
- Norrie disease
- Northern epilepsy syndrome
- Norum disease

=== Nos–Nov ===
- Nose polyposis, familial
- Notalgia paresthetica
- Nova syndrome
- Novak syndrome

== Nu–Ny ==
- Nuchal bleb, familial
- Nut allergy
- Nyctophobia
- Nystagmus
  - Nystagmus, central
  - Nystagmus, peripheral
  - Nystagmus with congenital zonular cataract
