= List of diseases (Z) =

This is a list of diseases starting with the letter "Z".

== Z ==
- Zadik–Barak–Levin syndrome
- ZAP70 deficiency
- Zamzam–Sheriff–Phillips syndrome
- Zechi-Ceide syndrome
- Zellweger syndrome
- Zenker's diverticulum
- Zieve's syndrome
- Zika virus
- Zimmerman–Laband syndrome
- Zinc deficiency
- Zinc toxicity
- Zlotogora syndrome
- Zollinger–Ellison syndrome
- Zonular cataract and nystagmus
- Zori–Stalker–Williams syndrome
- Zunich–Kaye syndrome
- Zuska's disease
- Zygomycosis
