= Neonatal diabetes =

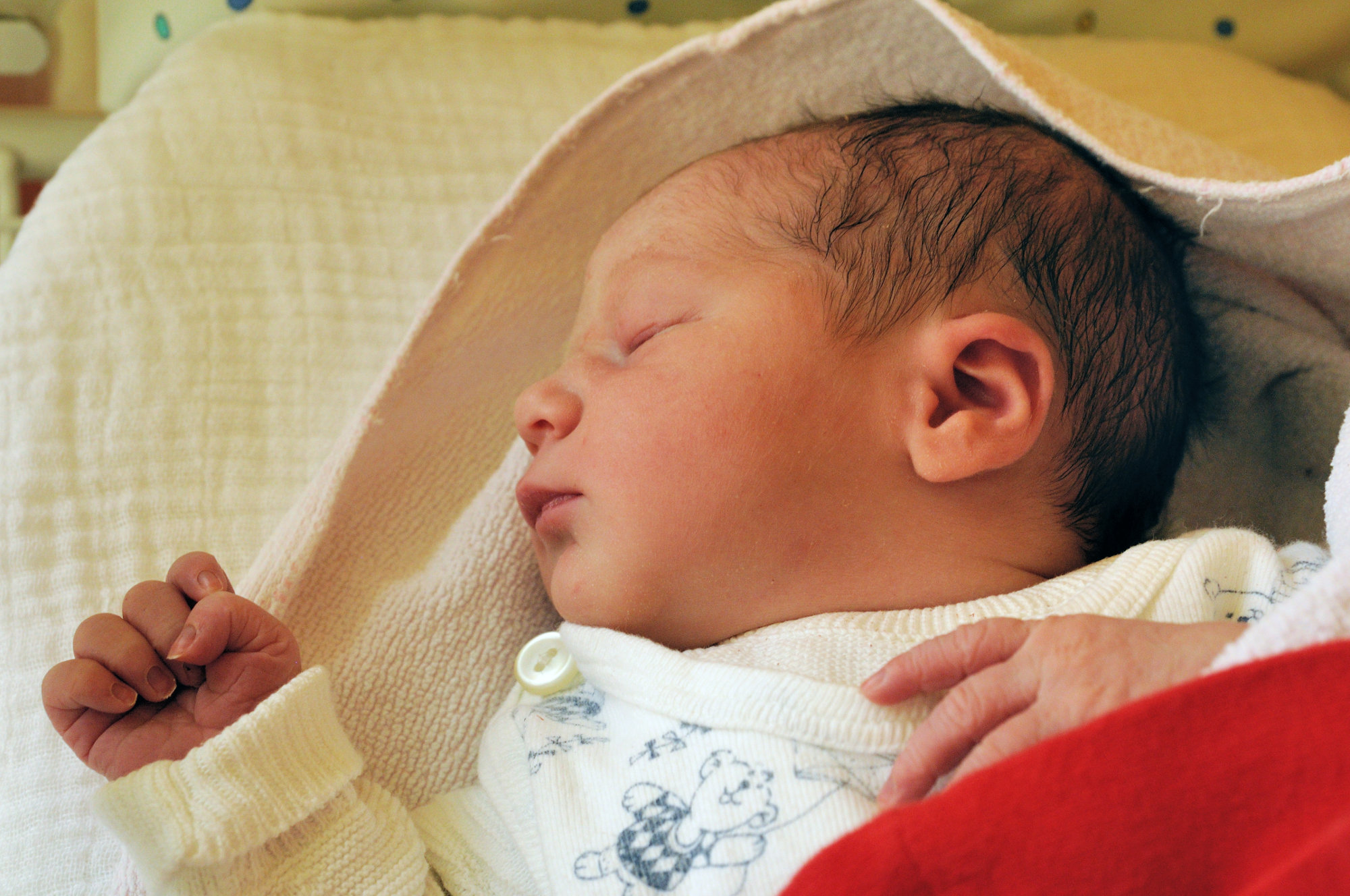
- Neonatal infant

Neonatal diabetes mellitus (NDM) is a disease that affects an infant and their body's ability to produce or use insulin. NDM is a kind of diabetes that, along with maturity onset diabetes of the young is monogenic (regulated by a single gene) and arises in the first 6 months of life. Infants do not produce enough insulin, leading to an increase in glucose accumulation. It is a rare disease, occurring in only one in 100,000 to 500,000 live births. NDM can be mistaken for the much more common type 1 diabetes, but type 1 diabetes usually occurs later than the first 6 months of life. There are two types of NDM: permanent neonatal diabetes mellitus (PNDM), a lifelong condition, and transient neonatal diabetes mellitus (TNDM), a form of diabetes that disappears during the infant stage but may reappear later in life.

Specific genes that can cause NDM have been identified. The onset of NDM can be caused by abnormal pancreatic development, beta cell dysfunction or accelerated beta cell dysfunction. Individuals with monogenic diabetes can pass it on to their children or future generations. Each gene associated with NDM has a different inheritance pattern.

== Signs and symptoms ==
The first sign of neonatal diabetes is often slowed fetal growth, followed by unusually low birthweight. At some point within the first six months of life, infants with neonatal diabetes tend to experience the classic symptoms of type 1 diabetes: thirst, frequent urination, and signs of dehydration. The timing of symptom onset varies with the type of neonatal diabetes. Those with transient neonatal diabetes tend to have symptoms in the first few days or weeks of life, with affected children showing weight loss and signs of dehydration, along with high levels of sugar in the blood and urine. Some children also have high levels of ketones in the blood and urine, or signs of metabolic acidosis. Permanent neonatal diabetes starts slightly later, typically around six weeks of age. Regardless of type, preterm infants tend to experience symptoms earlier, typically around one week of age.

Neonatal diabetes is classified into three subtypes: permanent, transient, and syndromic; each with distinct genetic causes and symptoms.

Syndromic neonatal diabetes is the term for diabetes as just one component of any of several complex syndromes that affect neonates, including IPEX syndrome, Wolcott-Rallison syndrome, and Wolfram syndrome. Symptoms vary widely based on the syndrome.

=== Complications ===
People with K_{ATP} channel variations are at increased risk of developing attention deficit hyperactivity disorder, sleep disruptions, seizures, and experiencing developmental delay – all due to the presence of K_{ATP} channels in the brain. These can range from unnoticeably mild to severe, and can sometimes improve with sulfonylurea treatment.

Those with 6q24 overexpression tend to have transient diabetes, with hyperglycemia tending to disappear within the first year of life. Despite the return of euglycemia, people with 6q24 overexpression are at high risk of developing diabetes later in life, as teenagers or adults.

Many of the genetic variations that cause neonatal diabetes are inherited in an autosomal dominant manner, i.e. receiving a single copy of the disease-associated variant results in disease. This is the case for the K_{ATP} genes KCNJ11 and ABCC8, and paternally inherited 6q24 amplifications, any of which have a 50% chance of being transmitted to each offspring of an affected individual.

== Cause ==
Neonatal diabetes is a genetic disease, caused by genetic variations that were either spontaneously acquired or inherited from one's parents. At least 30 distinct genetic variants can result in neonatal diabetes. The development and treatment of neonatal diabetes will vary based on the particular genetic cause. Known genetic variants cause neonatal diabetes by five major mechanisms: Preventing the development of the pancreas or β cells, promoting β-cell death by autoimmunity or endoplasmic reticulum stress, preventing β cells from recognizing glucose or secreting insulin, or abnormal expression of the 6q24 region on chromosome 6.

== Mechanism ==
Most permanent neonatal diabetes cases are caused by variations in the ATP-sensitive potassium channel, K_{ATP}. Disease-associated variants of either subunit of K_{ATP}, KCNJ11 and ABCC8, can result in a channel that is "stuck open", rendering the β cell unable to secrete insulin in response to high blood glucose. Children born with disease-associated K_{ATP} variants often have intrauterine growth restriction and resulting low birthweight. Similarly, the second most common cause of permanent neonatal diabetes is alterations to the gene that encodes insulin. Mutations associated with neonatal diabetes tend to cause misfolding of the insulin protein; misfolded insulin accumulates in the endoplasmic reticulum (ER), leading to ER stress and β-cell death.

Most transient neonatal diabetes is caused by the over-expression of a cluster of genes on chromosome 6, a region called 6q24. Over-expression of 6q24 is often caused by anomalous epigenetic regulation of the locus. The copy of 6q24 inherited from one's father normally has much higher gene expression than the copy inherited from one's mother. Therefore, inheriting two copies of the gene region from one's father (either through uniparental disomy, or receiving two copies from one's father in addition to the copy from one's mother) commonly results in over-expression of the locus. Alternatively, inheriting a maternal copy of 6q24 with defective DNA methylation can result in similar over-expression of the locus.

Variants in several other genes can cause neonatal diabetes, though these cases are much rarer. Genetic changes that disable the transcription factors CNOT1, GATA4, GATA6, PDX1, PTF1A, or RFX6 – all involved in the development of the pancreas – result in a shrunken or missing pancreas. Similarly, variations in the transcription factors GLIS3, NEUROD1, NEUROG3, NKX2-2, or MNX1 can result in malformed or absent β cells that do not secrete insulin. EIF2AK3 variants can exacerbate ER stress causing β-cell death, skeletal issues, and liver dysfunction. Some variations in immune gene FOXP3 can cause IPEX syndrome, a severe and multifaceted disease that includes neonatal diabetes among its symptoms.

Two genes in this region that can be associated with TNDM:

ZAC and HYMAI genes

ZAC is a zinc-finger protein that controls apoptosis (programmed cell death) and cell cycle arrest (cell division and duplication of DNA stops when the cell detects cell damage or defects) in PLAG1

(pleomorphic adenoma gene-like 1). PLAG1 is a transcription regulator of the type 1 receptor for pituitary adenylated cyclase-activating polypeptide (is a polypeptide that activates adenylate cyclase and increases the cyclic adenosine monophosphate or cAMP. cAMP is a second messenger that is used for neighboring cells to perform signal transduction in targeted cells), which is important for insulin secretion regulation. The function of the HYMAI (hydatiform mole-associated and imprinted transcript) is unknown.

Second, chromosome 6q24-TNDM is caused by over-expression of imprinted genes at 6q24 (PLAGL1 [ZAC] and HYMAI). It was discovered that a differentially methylated region (DMR) is present within the shared promoter of these genes. Generally the expression of the mother's alleles of PLAGL1 and HYMAI are blocked or not expressed by DMR methylation and only the father's alleles of PLAG1 and HYMA1 are expressed. The previously listed genetic mechanisms result in twice the normal amount of these two genes and cause chromosome 6q24 TNDM.

ZFP57 Gene

Third, mother's hypomethylation defects (a genetic defect that stops the allele from getting a methyl group, which would inhibit transcription) can occur from an isolated genomic imprinting or occur as a defect called, "hypomethylation imprinted loci" (HIL). HIL is defined as the loss of a methyl group in the 5-methylcytosine nucleotide at a fixed position on a chromosome. Homozygous ( having two of the same alleles) or heterozygous (defined as having one each of two different alleles) ZFP57 pathogenic variant make up almost half of TNDM-HIL, but the other causes of HIL are unknown.

Moreover, half of TNDM patients that contain chromosome 6q24-related TNDM experiencing re-occurrence of diabetes during their childhood or young adulthood. The onset of insulin resistance and increased insulin requirements are associated with puberty and pregnancy initiating the relapse of diabetes. In the event of remission, individuals do not show symptoms or impairment Beta-cell function in the fasting state. Insulin secretory response to intravenous glucose loading might be abnormal in those destined to have a relapse of diabetes. TNDM caused by 6q24 genomic defects are always associated with IGUR. Other contributing factors are umbilical hernia and enlarged tongue, which are present in 9 and 30% of patients with chromosome 6q24 related TNDM.

== Diagnosis ==
Diagnosis of neonatal diabetes is complicated by the fact that hyperglycemia is common in neonates – particularly in preterm infants, 25–75% of whom have hyperglycemia. Neonatal hyperglycemia typically begins in the first ten days of life, and lasts just two to three days.

=== Diagnosis of TNDM and PNDM ===
The diagnostic evaluations are based upon the following evaluation factors: patients with TNDM are more likely to have intrauterine growth retardation and less likely to develop ketoacidosis than patients with PNDM. TNDM patients are younger at the age of diagnosis of diabetes and have lower insulin requirements, an overlap occurs between the two groups, therefore TNDM cannot be distinguished from PNDM based clinical feature. An early onset of diabetes mellitus is unrelated to autoimmunity in most cases, relapse of diabetes is common with TNDM, and extensive follow ups are important. In addition, molecular analysis of chromosomes 6 defects, KCNJ11 and ABCC8 genes (encoding Kir6.2 and SUR1) provide a way to identify PNDM in the infant stages. Approximately 50% of PNDM are associated with the potassium channel defects which are essential consequences when changing patients from insulin therapy to sulfonylureas.

=== TNDM Diagnosis associated with Chromosome 6q24 Mutations ===
The uniparental disomy of the chromosome can be used as diagnostic method provide proof by the analysis of polymorphic markers is present on Chromosome 6. Meiotic segregation of the chromosome can be distinguished by comparing allele profiles of polymorphic makers in the child to the child's parents' genome. Normally, a total uniparental disomy of the chromosome 6 is evidenced, but partial one can be identified. Therefore, genetic markers that are close to the region of interest in chromosome 6q24 can be selected. Chromosome duplication can found by that technique also.

=== Diagnostic Test of NDM ===
- Fasting plasma glucose test: measures a diabetic's blood glucose after he or she has gone 8 hours without eat. This test is used to detect diabetes or pre-diabetes
- Oral glucose tolerance test- measures an individual's blood glucose after he or she have gone at least 8 hours without eating and two hours after the diabetic individual have drunk a glucose-containing beverage. This test can be used to diagnose diabetes or pre-diabetes
- Random plasma glucose test-the doctor checks one's blood glucose without regard to when an individual may have eaten his or her last meal. This test, along with an evaluation of symptoms, are used to diagnose diabetes but not pre-diabetes.

=== Genetic Testing of NDM ===
- Uniparental Disomy Test:

Samples from fetus or child and both parents are needed for analysis. Chromosome of interest must be specified on request form. For prenatal samples (only): if the amniotic fluid (non-confluent culture cells) are provided. Amniotic fluid is added and charged separately. Also, if chorionic villus sample is provided, a genetic test will be added and charged separately. Microsatellites markers and polymerase chain reaction are used on the chromosomes of interest to test the DNA of the parent and child to identify the presence of uniparental disomy.

== Treatment ==
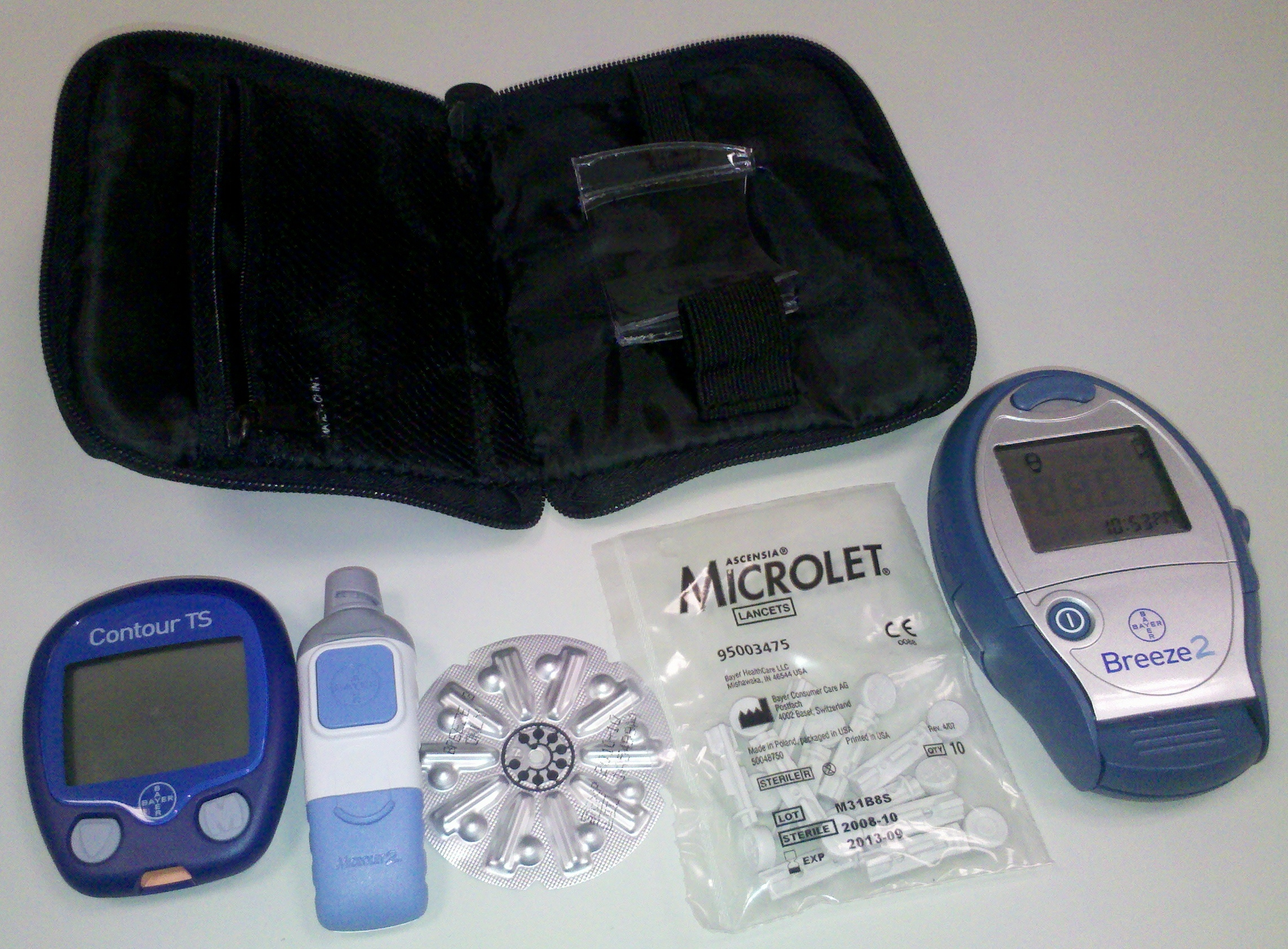
Neonatal Diabetes Mellitus (NDM)

Neonates with diabetes are initially treated by intravenous infusion of insulin, with a dose of 0.05 units/kilogram/hour commonly used.

Treatment options depend on the underlying genetic variations of each person with neonatal diabetes. The most common mutations underlying neonatal diabetes – KCNJ11 and ABCC8 variants – can be treated with sulfonylureas alone, eventually transitioning off of insulin completely.

In many cases, neonatal diabetes may be treated with oral sulfonylureas such as glyburide. Physicians may order genetic tests to determine whether or not transitioning from insulin to sulfonylurea drugs is appropriate for a patient.

People whose disease is caused by K_{ATP} variants can often be treated with high-dose sulfonylureas, which directly promote the closure of the K_{ATP} channel.

== Outcomes ==
The outcome for infants or adults with NDM have different outcomes among carriers of the disease. Among affected babies, some have PNDM while others have relapse of their diabetes and other patients may experience permanent remission. Diabetes may reoccur in the patient's childhood or adulthood. It was estimated that neonatal diabetes mellitus will be TNDM in about 50% are half of the cases.

During the Neonatal stage, the prognosis is determined by the severity of the disease (dehydration and acidosis), also based on how rapidly the disease is diagnosed and treated. Associated abnormalities (e.g. irregular growth in the womb or enlarged tongue) can effect a person's prognosis. The long-term prognosis depends on the person's metabolic control, which effects the presence and complications of diabetes complications. The prognosis can be confirmed with genetic analysis to find the genetic cause of the disease. With proper management, the prognosis for overall health and normal brain development is normally good. It is highly advised people living with NDM seek prognosis from their health care provider.

== Epidemiology ==
About 1 in 90,000 to 160,000 children born develops neonatal diabetes, with approximately half developing permanent and half transient neonatal diabetes.

== See also ==
- Type 1 Diabetes
- Type 2 Diabetes
