= HYMAI =

In molecular biology, Hydatidiform mole associated and imprinted (non-protein coding), also known as HYMAI, is a long non-coding RNA. It is an imprinted gene, which is paternally expressed. Overexpression of HYMAI and the protein-coding gene PLAG1 causes transient neonatal diabetes mellitus type 1 (TNDM1).

== See also ==
- Long noncoding RNA
