= Phallothrips =

Scientific classification
- Kingdom: Animalia
- Phylum: Arthropoda
- Class: Insecta
- Order: Thysanoptera
- Family: Phlaeothripidae
- Genus: Phallothrips; Mound & Crespi, 1992

Type species
- Phallothrips houstoni Mound & Crespi, 1992

Genus of thrips

Phallothrips is a genus of thrips in the family Phlaeothripidae, and consists of a single species, Phallothrips houstoni. It was first described in 1992 by Laurence Mound and Bernard Crespi.

Phallothrips houstoni is found in New South Wales, Queensland, and Western Australia.
