= Zinc finger protein 208 =

Protein found in humans

ZNF208

Identifiers
- Aliases: ZNF208, PMIDP, ZNF95, zinc finger protein 208
- External IDs: OMIM: 603977; MGI: 1917477; GeneCards: ZNF208

Gene location (Human)
Chr.	Chromosome 19 (human)
Band	19p12	Start	21,932,958 bp
Band	19p12	End	22,010,949 bp

Gene location (Mouse)
Chr.	Chromosome 7 (mouse)
Band	7|7 B3	Start	39,167,190 bp
Band	7|7 B3	End	39,189,844 bp
RNA expression pattern
Bgee	Human / Mouse (ortholog); Top expressed in: buccal mucosa cell; gonad; testicle; right auricle of heart; left ventricle; apex of heart; anterior pituitary; left lobe of thyroid gland; islet of Langerhans; right testis / Top expressed in: granulocyte; gastrula; genital tubercle; ventricular zone; otic vesicle; trigeminal ganglion; medial ganglionic eminence; tail of embryo; embryo; triceps brachii muscle; More reference expression data
BioGPS	n/a
Gene ontology
Molecular function	DNA binding; zinc ion binding; metal ion binding; nucleic acid binding; DNA-binding transcription factor activity, RNA polymerase II-specific
Cellular component	intracellular anatomical structure; nucleus
Biological process	regulation of transcription, DNA-templated; transcription, DNA-templated; regulation of transcription by RNA polymerase II
Sources:Amigo / QuickGO
Orthologs
Databases	NCBI: entry; OMA: entry
Species	Human	Mouse
Entrez	7757	70227
Ensembl	ENSG00000160321	ENSMUSG00000068959
UniProt	O43345	n/a
RefSeq (mRNA)	NM_001329971; NM_001329972; NM_001329973; NM_001329974; NM_007153	NM_001004139
RefSeq (protein)	NP_001316900; NP_001316901; NP_001316902; NP_001316903; NP_009084	n/a
Location (UCSC)	Chr 19: 21.93 – 22.01 Mb	Chr 7: 39.17 – 39.19 Mb
PubMed search
- Wikidata
View/Edit Human	View/Edit Mouse

Zinc finger protein 208 is a protein that in humans is encoded by the ZNF208 gene.

== Function ==
Zinc finger proteins (ZNFs), such as ZNF208, bind DNA and, through this binding, regulate gene transcription. Most ZNFs contain conserved C2H2 motifs and are classified as Kruppel-type zinc fingers. A conserved protein motif, termed the Kruppel-associated box (KRAB) domain, mediates protein-protein interactions (Eichler et al., 1998 [PubMed 9724325]). See ZNF91 (MIM 603971) for further information on ZNFs.
