= Zinc finger protein 334 =

Protein found in humans

ZNF334

Identifiers
- Aliases: ZNF334, zinc finger protein 334
- External IDs: MGI: 2388656; GeneCards: ZNF334

Gene location (Mouse)
Chr.	Chromosome 2 (mouse)
Band	2|2 H3	Start	165,216,184 bp
Band	2|2 H3	End	165,230,179 bp
Gene ontology
Molecular function	DNA-binding transcription factor activity; DNA binding; metal ion binding; nucleic acid binding; protein binding; DNA-binding transcription factor activity, RNA polymerase II-specific
Cellular component	intracellular anatomical structure; nucleus
Biological process	regulation of transcription, DNA-templated; transcription, DNA-templated; regulation of transcription by RNA polymerase II
Sources:Amigo / QuickGO
Orthologs
Databases	NCBI: entry; OMA: entry
Species	Human	Mouse
Entrez	55713	228876
Ensembl	ENSG00000198185	ENSMUSG00000017667
UniProt	Q9HCZ1	A2A4U6
RefSeq (mRNA)	NM_001270497; NM_018102; NM_199441	NM_178411
RefSeq (protein)	NP_001257426; NP_060572; NP_001340742; NP_001340743; NP_001340744 NP_001340745; NP_001340746; NP_001340747; NP_001340748; NP_001340749; NP_001340750; NP_001340751; NP_001340752; NP_001340753; NP_001340754; NP_001340755; NP_955473	NP_848498
Location (UCSC)	n/a	Chr 2: 165.22 – 165.23 Mb
PubMed search
- Wikidata
View/Edit Human	View/Edit Mouse

Zinc finger protein 334 is a protein that in humans is encoded by the ZNF334 gene.

== Function ==
This gene encodes a member of the C2H2 zinc finger family. The encoded protein contains a Krueppel-associated box, fourteen C2H2 zinc finger domains, and four C2H2-type/integrase DNA-binding domains. Decreased expression of this gene may be a marker for rheumatoid arthritis. Alternative splicing results in multiple transcript variants that encode different protein isoforms.
