= Zinc finger protein 398 =

Protein found in humans

ZNF398

Identifiers
- Aliases: ZNF398, P51, P71, ZER6, zinc finger protein 398
- External IDs: MGI: 1917856; GeneCards: ZNF398

Gene location (Human)
Chr.	Chromosome 7 (human)
Band	7q36.1	Start	149,126,416 bp
Band	7q36.1	End	149,183,042 bp

Gene location (Mouse)
Chr.	Chromosome 6 (mouse)
Band	6|6 B2.3	Start	47,812,595 bp
Band	6|6 B2.3	End	47,850,471 bp
RNA expression pattern
Bgee	Human / Mouse (ortholog); Top expressed in: buccal mucosa cell; endothelial cell; Brodmann area 23; amniotic fluid; middle temporal gyrus; cerebellar vermis; palpebral conjunctiva; pancreatic epithelial cell; skin of hip; mucosa of ileum / Top expressed in: lumbar spinal ganglion; female urethra; Rostral migratory stream; genital tubercle; secondary oocyte; neural layer of retina; ascending aorta; lumbar subsegment of spinal cord; male urethra; aortic valve; More reference expression data
BioGPS	n/a
Gene ontology
Molecular function	DNA binding; protein binding; metal ion binding; nucleic acid binding; DNA-binding transcription factor activity, RNA polymerase II-specific
Cellular component	intracellular anatomical structure; nucleus
Biological process	positive regulation of transcription, DNA-templated; regulation of transcription, DNA-templated; transcription, DNA-templated; regulation of transcription by RNA polymerase II
Sources:Amigo / QuickGO
Orthologs
Databases	NCBI: entry; OMA: entry
Species	Human	Mouse
Entrez	57541	272347
Ensembl	ENSG00000197024	ENSMUSG00000062519
UniProt	Q8TD17	n/a
RefSeq (mRNA)	NM_020781; NM_170686	NM_027477; NM_173034
RefSeq (protein)	NP_065832; NP_733787	n/a
Location (UCSC)	Chr 7: 149.13 – 149.18 Mb	Chr 6: 47.81 – 47.85 Mb
PubMed search
- Wikidata
View/Edit Human	View/Edit Mouse

Zinc finger protein 398 is a protein that in humans is encoded by the ZNF398 gene.

== Function ==
This gene encodes a member of the Kruppel family of C2H2-type zinc-finger transcription factor proteins. The encoded protein acts as a transcriptional activator. Two transcript variants encoding distinct isoforms have been identified for this gene. Other transcript variants have been described, but their full length sequence has not been determined.
