= Christopher Badcock =

British sociologist

- Born: Christopher Robert Badcock; 1946 (age 79–80)
- Education: Maidstone Grammar School; London School of Economics
- Known for: Imprinted brain hypothesis
- Scientific career
- Fields: Sociology
- Institutions: Polytechnic of the South Bank; London School of Economics
- Thesis: The methodology of Claude Levi-Strauss and its historical antecedents (1973)
- Doctoral advisor: Ernest Gellner

Christopher Robert Badcock (born 1946) is a British sociologist and emeritus Reader in Sociology at the London School of Economics, from which he retired in 2011. He received his PhD from the London School of Economics in 1973 under the supervision of Ernest Gellner. His thesis, and his early work thereafter, focused on the work of Claude Levi-Strauss. He served as a lecturer in sociology at Polytechnic of the South Bank from 1969 to 1973, and was on the faculty in the Sociology Department at the London School of Economics from 1974 until his retirement. He is known for working with Bernard Crespi to develop the imprinted brain hypothesis, according to which autism results from "a paternal bias in the expression of imprinted genes", whereas psychosis results from a maternal and/or X-chromosome bias in the expression of such genes.
