= Metabolic imprinting =

Long-term metabolic effects of environment on fetuses and neonates

Metabolic imprinting refers to the long-term physiological and metabolic effects that an offspring's prenatal and postnatal environments have on them. Perinatal nutrition has been identified as a significant factor in determining an offspring's likelihood of it being predisposed to developing cardiovascular disease, obesity, and type 2 diabetes amongst other conditions.

During pregnancy, maternal glucose can cross the blood-placental barrier meaning maternal hyperglycaemia is associated with foetal hyperglycaemia. Despite maternal glucose being able to cross the blood-placental barrier, maternal insulin is not able and the foetus has to make its own. As a result, if a mother is hyperglycaemic the foetus is likely to be hyperinsulinaemic which leads to it having increased levels of growth and adiposity.

== Maternal undernutrition ==

Maternal undernutrition has been linked with low birth weight and also a number of diseases, including Cardiovascular disease, stroke, hypertension and diabetes. When a foetus is in the womb and is not receiving sufficient nutrition, it can adapt to prioritize organ growth and increased metabolic efficiency to prepare itself for life in an energy deficient environment. Postnatally, when given the correct nutrition, babies exhibit ‘catch up growth’, potentially leading to obesity and other related complications. Studies based around restricting animals food intake throughout gestation have discovered that a reduction of just 30% of normal intake can cause low birth weight and increase sensitivity to high-fat-diet induced obesity.

In animal models, intrauterine undernutrition has been shown to be associated with hypertension later in life. This is because the formation of the kidneys is inhibited, which decreases filtration and flow rate through the nephrons, leading to increased blood pressure.

More extreme prenatal conditions such as famine have been shown to have effects on the neurodevelopment of a foetus. After the Dutch Famine of the winter of 1944–1945, it was found that the risk of schizophrenia was significantly higher in those conceived at the height of the famine, as was the prevalence of schizoid personality.

== Maternal over-nutrition ==
Maternal overnutrition can have detrimental effects on the health of the offspring later in life. This area is less well studied and understood but some progress has been made in identifying specific genes that are affected. Studies have investigated hypermethylation of DNA and found it to be higher in obese mothers to those of a healthy BMI. More specific studies have investigated Leptin (LEP) as a possible gene which is altered via metabolic imprinting in response to overnutrition in utero, and found hypermethylation of LEP in the placenta of those born to overly nourished mothers. This hypermethylation has been found to cause changes in the levels of circulating Leptin, as well as to leptin sensitivity and the development of neural circuits involved in the control of homeostasis which causes the higher risk of metabolic disease.

Upon investigation it was found that a mother who was obese before conception was likely to have a higher level of placental LEP than the placenta of a mother of a healthy weight. One strategy for overcoming obesity is the use of gastric bypass and other such surgeries, while this does not entirely alleviate the risk of altered metabolic imprinting it has been found that siblings born post maternal surgery are less likely to have as high body fat percentages than over nutrition as siblings born before the surgery.

Paternal overnutrition can also have a detrimental effect and new-borns have shown changes in methylation of DNA generally, with substantial hypomethylation at the gene Insulin-like Growth factor 2 (IGF2). However, this topic is much less studied than maternal nutrition.

== Maternal/gestational diabetes ==
An increase in certain hormones such as oestrogen, progesterone, human placental lactogen, human placental growth hormone and cortisol during the second and third trimester of pregnancy cause an increase in insulin resistance. This increase in insulin resistance and following increase in insulin secretion ensures that the foetus develops a normal glucose tolerance. Gestational Diabetes Mellitus (GDM) arises when beta cells do not secrete enough insulin to adopt to the insulin resistance triggered by pregnancy, which leads to mild hyperglycaemia.

Although the mechanisms are still largely unknown, foetus exposure to GDM and maternal diabetes has been shown to lead to lifelong metabolic complications because of metabolic imprinting. The risk of Type II diabetes developing in offspring is significantly higher in offspring where the mother was diagnosed with Type II diabetes before pregnancy rather than after. In addition, the age at which offspring are diagnosed with Type 2 diabetes is significantly younger in offspring exposed to maternal diabetes/GDM than those who are not. It is suggested that this is a result of DNA methylation during foetal development.
