= Imprinted brain hypothesis =

Conjecture on the causes of autism and psychosis

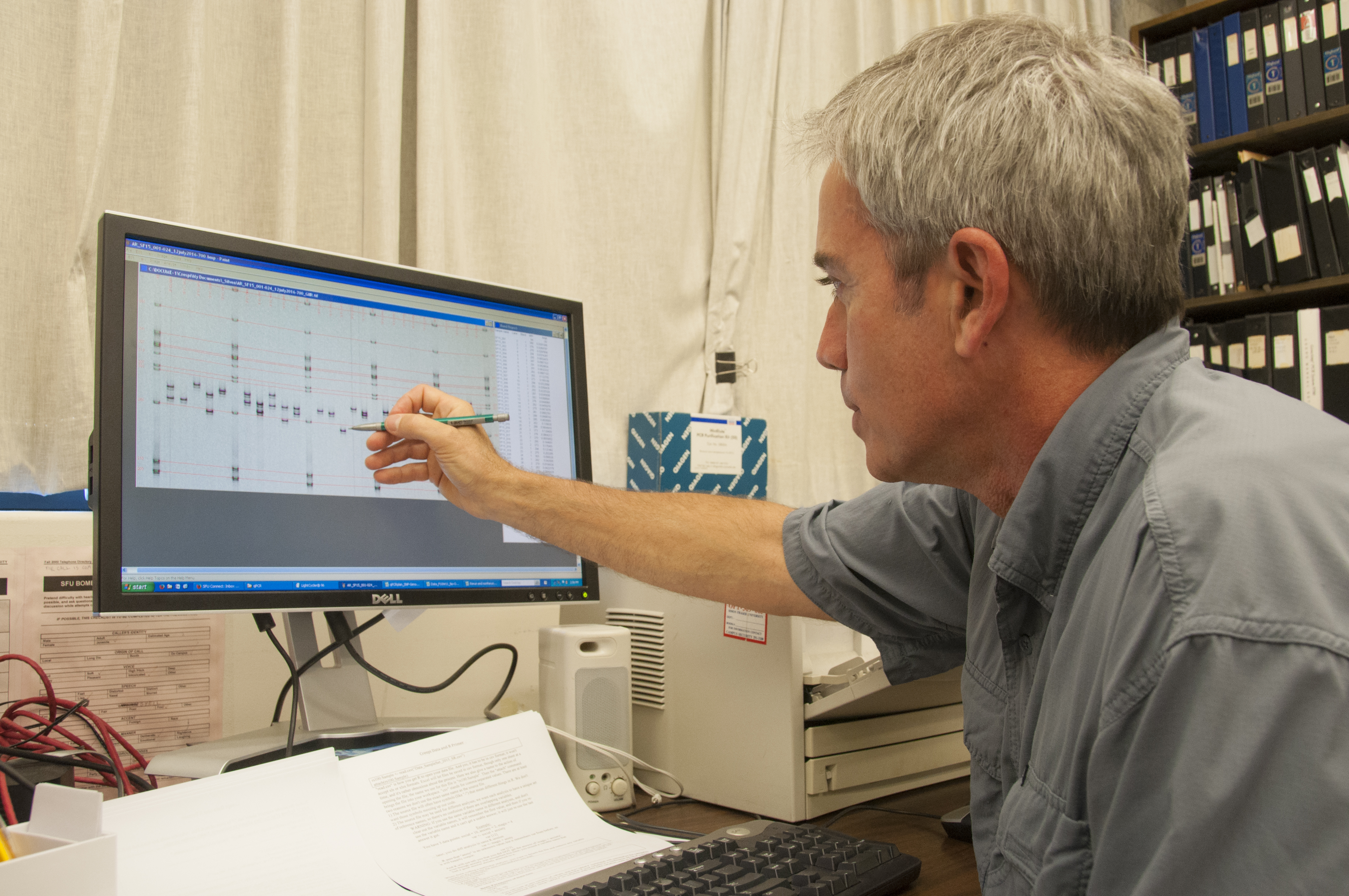
- Bernard Crespi, the primary originator of the hypothesis, in 2016
- Claims: Autism and schizophrenia are genetic opposites via parental genomic imprinting
- Related scientific disciplines: Autism, schizophrenia, developmental disability, evolutionary psychology
- Year proposed: 2008
- Original proponents: Bernard Crespi, Christopher Badcock

The imprinted brain hypothesis is a hypothesis in evolutionary psychology regarding the causes of autism spectrum and schizophrenia spectrum disorders, first presented by Bernard Crespi and Christopher Badcock in 2008. It hypothesizes that genomic imprinting effects contribute, to some degree, to the diametric (opposite) nature of autism and psychosis (the diametric disorders hypothesis, which is much more general than the imprinted brain idea).

The imprinted brain hypothesis is based around genomic imprinting, an epigenetic process through which genes are expressed differently depending upon which parent they are inherited from. Specifically, the imprinted brain hypothesis proposes that autism spectrum disorders are caused to some degree by biases towards paternal gene expression, while psychosis spectrum disorders are caused in some cases by biases towards maternal gene expression.

The imprinted brain hypothesis is supported by high rates of autism in Angelman syndrome (which is due to paternal imprinted gene biases) and high rates of psychosis in Prader-Willi-syndrome (which is due to maternal imprinted gene biases).

The diametric disorders hypothesis and the imprinted brain hypothesis have been subject to considerable research and testing, with considerable support and some non-supportive evidence, e.g., .

== Genomic imprinting ==
Genomic imprinting is an epigenetic process by which certain genes are expressed in a parent-of-origin-specific manner. The imprinted brain theory represents an application of the kinship theory of genomic imprinting, also known as the conflict theory of genomic imprinting. The kinship theory argues that in diploid organisms, such as humans, the maternal and paternal set of genes may have antagonistic reproductive interests since the mother and father may have antagonistic interests regarding the development of the child. The kinship theory is one of multiple competing major hypotheses regarding genomic imprinting and is supported by proponents of the imprinted brain hypothesis. The precise matter of how genomic imprinting works has not yet been resolved.

== Hypothesis and background ==
Proponents of the kinship theory of imprinting argue that since it is uncertain if a woman's other and future children have and will have the same father, as well as the father generally having lower parental investment, it may be in the father's reproductive interest for his child to use more of the mother's resources than other children, while it may be in the mother's interest for a child to take fewer resources and free up more for herself and future children. Thus, genomic imprinting a with slight maternal bias would supposedly be associated with factors such as decreased growth, more tractable behavior, and an empathizing and less self-centered personality causing less demands on the mother. The opposite would occur for a slight paternal bias.

However, an extreme genomic imprinting in favor of maternal genes is argued to cause psychosis such as in schizophrenia spectrum disorders, while an extreme genomic imprinting in favor of paternal genes is argued to cause autism spectrum disorders. This claims the symptoms of schizophrenia are associated with overempathizing, resulting in delusions and paranoia, while those of autism are caused by underempathizing. Specifically, autism is considered to be a tendency to under-mentalize and under-empathize in a way that treats people as objects, while schizotypy is considered to be the inverse tendency to over-mentalize and over-empathize until objects are treated as people. Certain neuroimaging findings lend support to the hypothesis, although neuroimaging in schizophrenia is controversial due to the neurological impact of neuroleptic medication, and other neuroimaging findings have results inconsistent with the hypothesis.

Traits such as the ambivalence seen in negative symptoms versus the single-minded focus of autistic special interests are also posited to be distinctions, although the pronounced similarity and overlap between negative symptomatology seen in the two disorders weakens this claim substantially.

The imprinted brain hypothesis was first proposed in 2008 by biologist Bernard Crespi and sociologist Christopher Badcock, neither of whom had previous experience with cognitive science or behavioural genetics. Publishing their first presentation of their claims in the influential cognitive science journal Behavioral and Brain Sciences, the hypothesis attracted significant attention, both interested and critical.

== Arguments regarding the hypothesis ==
The imprinted brain hypothesis has some similarities with the extreme male brain theory of autism, but they differ significantly. Proponents of the imprinted brain hypothesis state that the hypothesized imprinting mechanism may have detrimental interactions when extreme genomic imprinting occurs in the opposite sex, which they claim provides an explanation for something that would be a 'problem' for the extreme male brain claims—specifically, that female autism tends to be particularly severe. This is also used as an explanation for the relative severity of schizophrenia in males. However, proponents of the extreme male brain theory believe sexual dimorphism in autism severity is already explained by diagnostic discrepancy.

In both autism and schizophrenia, theory of mind is impaired, which the imprinted brain hypothesis posits occurs via different mechanisms and is not generalizable to the broader underlying neurotypes. Proponents of the hypothesis claim people with positive schizotypal traits have an enhanced theory of mind, increased emphatic ability, and an improved ability to recognize the emotions of others, but this idea is not supported by research on the schizotypal personality disorder population or on measures of 'healthy' schizotypy in the general population. Rather, theory of mind appears to be impaired in all schizophrenia-spectrum conditions even in the absence of frank psychosis.

Factors such as nutrition during pregnancy are believed to affect imprinting. Proponents note that schizophrenia is associated with maternal starvation during pregnancy while autism has increased in diagnostic prevalence in affluent societies, although the general scientific consensus is that rising rates of autism diagnosis in wealthy societies are related to awareness rather than prevalence.

Autism and schizophrenia appear to be related to birth weight in opposite ways, with autism being associated with high birth weight and schizophrenia with low birth weight. Supporters of the hypothesis point towards this association as evidence.

Proponents of the hypothesis also point towards genetic disorders with an elevated risk of one disorder and not the other, especially imprinting disorders, to support their claims. For instance, Beckwith-Wiedemann syndrome is caused by increased effects of paternally imprinted genes and has an increased incidence of autism. Contrary to the overall claim here, the majority of disorders that raise the risk of one of autism and schizophrenia also do so for the other, including in ways that directly contradict the imprinted brain hypothesis such as for imprinting disorders. For instance, velocardiofacial syndrome is associated with significant increases (10- to 40-fold above the general population) in the risk for both autism and schizophrenia.

Data from copy number variation and genome-wide association studies support shared genetic mechanisms causing schizophrenia and autism, although this only lends circumstantial support to the imprinted brain hypothesis and can also be used to support many competing hypotheses.

The role of oxytocin in autism and schizophrenia has also been researched, and some findings and characterizations of the research have been used in favour of the hypothesis. Oxytocin appears to have treatment potential in both autism and schizophrenia, likely including schizotypal personality disorder. Crespi proposes that, contrary to this suggestion, high oxytocin is a contributing factor in population schizotypy and creates "hyper-developed" social understanding that induces psychosis. Supporters of the hypothesis point towards associations between higher oxytocin levels and personality traits that are also associated with schizotypy, such as creativity and divergent thinking. However, both schizotypal personality disorder and schizotypy in the general population appear associated with the same oxytocin deficits as observed in schizophrenia, and the degree to which positive symptoms of schizophrenia and schizotypy are associated with high oxytocin—as argued by proponents—appears unclear and contradicted.

== Issues ==
The broad claim that autism and schizophrenia are diametric on the biological level is supported by considerable research, as described in Crespi and Badcock 2008. However, some findings appear to contradict the hypothesis, such as that in samples of autistic adults, schizophrenia and other non-affective psychotic disorders occur at far higher rates than the general population, occurring in about 8-10% of the broad ASD population and as high as one-third in PDD-NOS. The same association occurs in childhood onset schizophrenia, which is considered a more homogenous form of the disorder that hews closest to the hypothetical neurodevelopmental disorder underlying schizophrenia-spectrum conditions; approximately one-quarter of children with schizophrenia fit the criteria for an autism spectrum disorder prior to the onset of psychosis, and the majority have clinical or subclinical disturbances of social, motor, or language skills similar to those seen in autistic children. Adults with schizophrenia and related psychotic disorders also have higher rates of autistic symptomatology than healthy controls. The presence of this apparent contradictory evidence may result from common misdiagnoses of premorbidity to schizophrenia as autism spectrum, as Crespi and Badcock describe.

Crespi and Badcock make a number of claims about genetic disorders and their relationship to the hypothesis; for instance, that the relationship between those disorders and sex chromosome aneuploidy supports the hypothesis, with trisomy X and Klinefelter syndrome (extra X chromosomes) increasing schizophrenia risk and Turner syndrome (one X chromosome) increasing autism risk. However, polysomy X conditions are associated with increased autism as well as schizophrenia risk, and Turner syndrome is approximately three times as common in schizophrenic women as the general female population. Genetic syndromes in general lend credence to the suggestion that autism and schizophrenia are related rather than contraindicated, with conditions that sharply increase one risk tending to also increase the other. For instance, velocardiofacial syndrome, which is associated with a 20- to 30-fold increase in schizophrenia risk, also significantly increases the risk of autism. Other chromosomal disorders notable for significantly increasing the risk of both autism and schizophrenia include 15q11.2 microdeletions and 17q12 microdeletion syndrome.

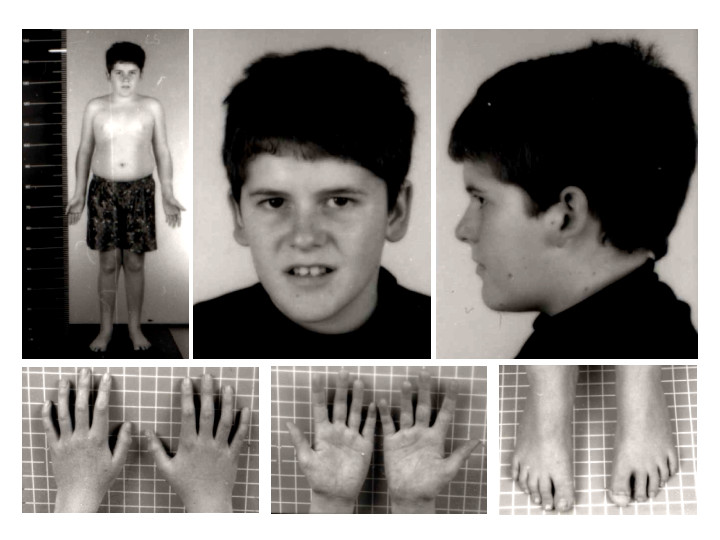
Imprinting disorders such as Prader-Willi syndrome tend to have phenotypes that contradict the hypothesis.

Moreover, the specific predictions the imprinted brain hypothesis makes about imprinting disorders are for the most part falsified. The imprinted brain hypothesis predicts that Prader-Willi syndrome, a disorder of maternal overimprinting, should have decreased autism and increased psychosis, while Angelman syndrome, a disorder of paternal overimprinting, should have the opposite. However, autism rates are substantially above those of the general population in PWS and similar to or below it in AS, while non-affective psychosis appears to occur at rates comparable to the general population in PWS. Indeed, it has been suggested that maternally imprinted cases of Prader-Willi syndrome have an elevated autism prevalence compared to all etiologies of the disorder, the exact opposite of the imprinted brain hypothesis. Despite being contradicted by other research, Crespi nonetheless claims that imprinting disorders as a rule fit his hypothesis.

While Crespi and Badcock have claimed neuroimaging studies lend support to the imprinted brain hypothesis, other neuroimaging studies have found contradictory results. Several neurological findings are common to both autism and schizophrenia. The brain regions that distinguish schizophrenia from autism are also those at the centre of the controversy regarding neuroleptic medication, reducing the degree to which they can be used to distinguish the disorders; autistic subjects taking psychotropic medication share some of the altered neuroconnectivity that Crespi and Badcock ascribe to schizophrenia.

The imprinted brain hypothesis has also been criticized for inaccurately presenting the schizophrenia spectrum and making claims about schizophrenic disorders that are at odds with their clinical profiles. The claim that milder schizophrenia-spectrum disorders are associated with intensified empathy and strong theory of mind is imperiled by research showing the opposite. The specific pattern of empathy deficits also appears to be consistent between autism and schizophrenia, with both demonstrating impaired cognitive empathy and relatively preserved affective empathy. Crespi and Badcock's attempt to conceptualize schizophrenia as a relatively homogenous disorder that slots neatly into one end of a spectrum has been criticized due to the clinical heterogeneity in even individual cases of schizophrenia, due to the different presentation and course of positive and negative symptoms.

One of the most significant components of the hypothesis is that it predicts autism should be associated with "hypo-mentalizing" and psychotic spectrum disorders (such as schizophrenia, bipolar disorder, depression and borderline personality) with "hyper-mentalizing"; that is, that people in each group should have different impairments in mentalizing. This is a core component of the diametric disorders hypothesis, and one of the fundamental assumptions involved. Meta-analysis of mentalizing skills in autism and schizophrenia does not support this claim, but hypermentalizing has been supported by studies of borderline personality and depression. Thus, while autism and schizophrenia appear to both be associated with mentalizing impairments, some psychotic spectrum disorders do involve hyper-mentalizing.

== See also ==
- Causes of autism
- Conditions comorbid to autism spectrum disorders
- Multiple complex developmental disorder
