= Kaguya (mouse) =

Mouse that had two same-sex parents

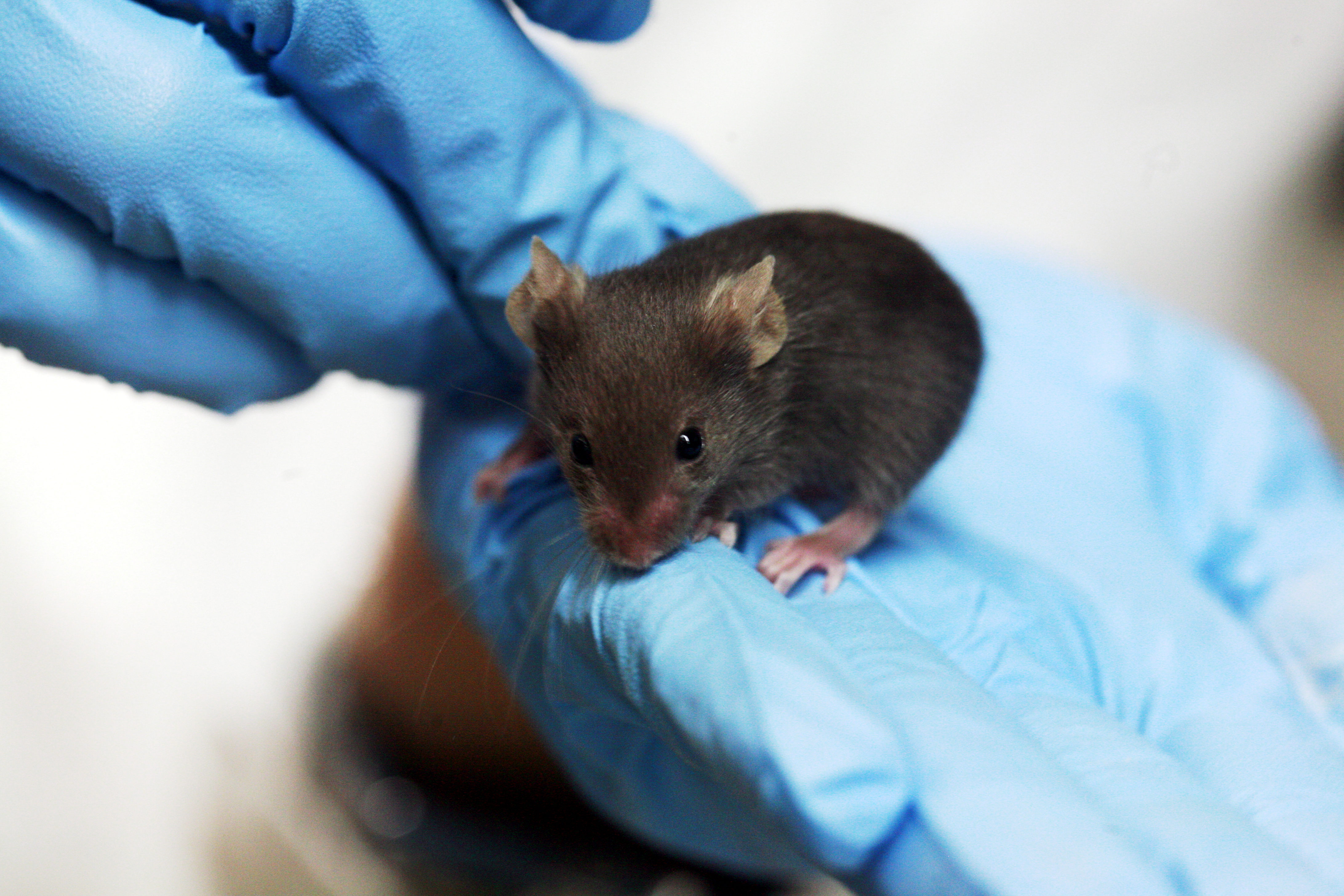
In mice, natural mating involves fertilization of an egg by a sperm. Kaguya was created in laboratory from two egg cells.

Kaguya was the first bimaternal mouse created in laboratory using two eggs from female parents by Tomohiro Kono and colleagues at Tokyo University of Agriculture as described in a 2004 paper in Nature. This was a hallmark experiment as natural fertilization in mice requires the contribution of an egg from the female parent and a sperm from the male parent. The first bimaternal mouse was named after a Japanese folk tale, in which the Moon-born princess Kaguya (Kaguya-hime) is found as a baby inside a bamboo stalk.

== Parthenogenesis in mammals ==
Parthenogenesis is a form of asexual reproduction that refers to development of an embryo from an unfertilized egg cell by the female parent. Although this happens naturally in many taxa, such as plants, some invertebrates, and vertebrates, it has not been recorded in any mammals. Rapid advances in molecular biology and genomics have made it possible for successful artificial development of a mouse embryo solely from unfertilized eggs.

Epigenetics refers to proteins and enzymes that sit above the DNA sequence and influence its activity. Parent-specific epigenetic changes, known as genomic imprinting, are required for successful fertilization and embryonic development in mammals. These modifications fine-tune the expression of key genes in development.

== Bimaternal mice ==
To overcome the genomic barriers arising due to parent-specific gene activity that prevent successful development of embryos only from egg cells in mammals, Kono and colleagues genetically modified eggs from newborn female mice to make them similar to a sperm cell. Egg cells undergo DNA methylation, which is an epigenetic change associated with silencing of gene activity, during their development. Eggs from newborn mice are not methylated yet, thus making their epigenetic modifications more similar to sperm cells. The researchers altered the expression of Igf2 and H19 genes by deleting a region of H19 in the newborn egg. These two genes are key regulators of mammalian embryonic development and have different levels of activity in the sperm and egg cell due to genomic imprinting. The deleted region between the two contains a methylated region that regulates their activity. They then moved the nucleus of the modified newborn egg into a mature egg for artificial fertilization.

Of the 598 eggs used in the experiment, only two embryos successfully developed into viable offspring. One of them was used to look at gene activity in bimaternal mice. The other was named Kaguya. Kaguya was raised to the adult stage and was able to produce offspring through mating with a male mouse.

=== Differences in comparison to normal mice ===
Many of the mice pups recovered in this experiment had atypical development and died prematurely and some eggs failed to successfully impregnate female mice; only two pups survived. Mice with atypical development exhibited developmentally delayed livers. Bimaternal mice had significantly lower body and placental weight compared to the controls.

A mouse microarray, a tool used to study the activity of many genes at once, with 11’000 genes was used to compare the gene expression of the developmentally typical bimaternal mouse embryo to mice born from natural mating. This was done to see if there are any differences between the two groups at molecular level. More than 1’000 genes were found to have different levels of activity in the bimaternal mouse compared to the controls. It was revealed that these genes are mostly associated with cell communication, cell growth/maintenance, and metabolism. However, the small sample size per group, reliance on older technology, and single time point analysis may limit the informativeness of this genetic analysis.

== Follow-up study ==
In a follow up paper, Kono lab was able to increase the number of bimaternal mice generated by modifying the genetic manipulations performed on the newborn eggs used in the experiment. Bimaternal pups similar to controls were shown to grow at a slower rate and have a longer lifespan.
