= PLAGL1 =

Protein-coding gene in the species Homo sapiens

Identifiers
- Aliases: PLAGL1, LOT1, ZAC, ZAC1, PLAG1 like zinc finger 1
- External IDs: OMIM: 603044; MGI: 1100874; GeneCards: PLAGL1

Gene location (Human)
Chr.	Chromosome 6 (human)
Band	6q24.2	Start	143,940,300 bp
Band	6q24.2	End	144,064,599 bp

Gene location (Mouse)
Chr.	Chromosome 10 (mouse)
Band	10 A2|10 4.72 cM	Start	13,060,504 bp
Band	10 A2|10 4.72 cM	End	13,131,694 bp
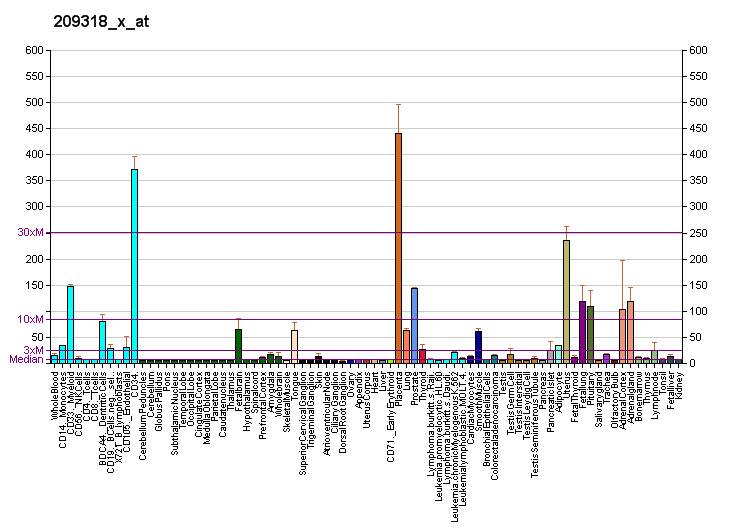

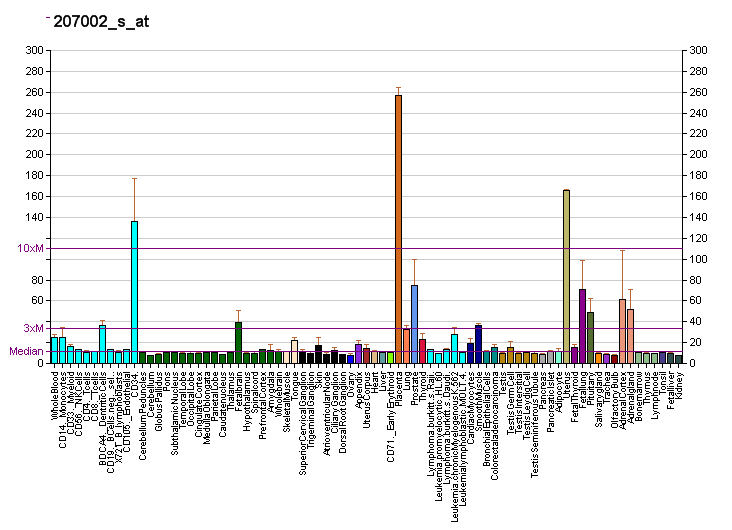

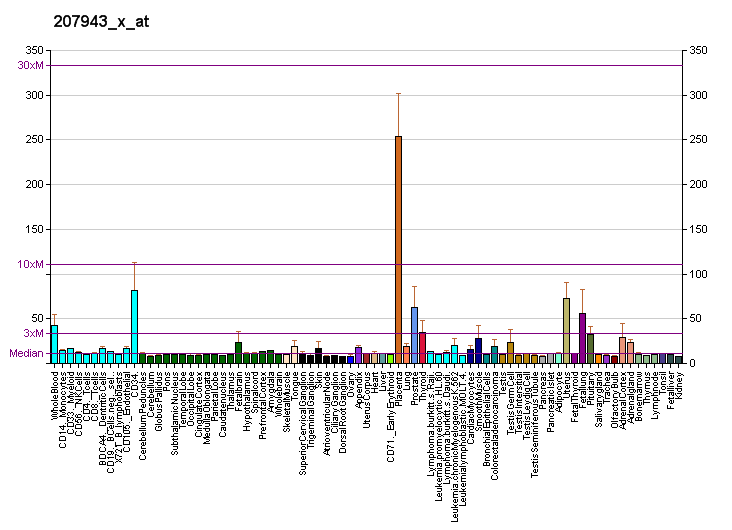
RNA expression pattern
Bgee	Human / Mouse (ortholog); Top expressed in: skin of hip; placenta; right adrenal cortex; tibia; cartilage tissue; pituitary gland; synovial joint; human penis; Descending thoracic aorta; skin of thigh / Top expressed in: efferent ductule; dermis; human fetus; Gonadal ridge; atrium; internal carotid artery; median eminence; umbilical cord; left lung lobe; abdominal wall; More reference expression data
BioGPS	More reference expression data
Gene ontology
Molecular function	DNA-binding transcription activator activity, RNA polymerase II-specific; nucleic acid binding; metal ion binding; DNA binding; RNA polymerase II transcription regulatory region sequence-specific DNA binding; DNA-binding transcription factor activity, RNA polymerase II-specific
Cellular component	Golgi apparatus; intracellular membrane-bounded organelle; nucleus; nucleoplasm; nuclear body
Biological process	cell differentiation; regulation of transcription, DNA-templated; positive regulation of transcription by RNA polymerase II; transcription, DNA-templated; apoptotic process; DNA damage response, signal transduction by p53 class mediator resulting in cell cycle arrest; transcription by RNA polymerase II; regulation of transcription by RNA polymerase II
Sources:Amigo / QuickGO
Orthologs
Databases	NCBI: entry; OMA: entry
Species	Human	Mouse
Entrez	5325	22634
Ensembl	ENSG00000118495	ENSMUSG00000019817
UniProt	Q9UM63	n/a
RefSeq (mRNA)	NM_006718; NM_001080951; NM_001080952; NM_001080953; NM_001080954 NM_001080955; NM_001080956; NM_001289037; NM_001289038; NM_001289039; NM_001289040; NM_001289041; NM_001289042; NM_001289043; NM_001289044; NM_001289045; NM_001289046; NM_001289047; NM_001289048; NM_001289049; NM_002656; NM_001317156; NM_001317157; NM_001317158; NM_001317159; NM_001317160; NM_001317161; NM_001317162	NM_009538
RefSeq (protein)	NP_001074420; NP_001074421; NP_001074422; NP_001074423; NP_001074424 NP_001074425; NP_001275966; NP_001275967; NP_001275968; NP_001275969; NP_001275970; NP_001275971; NP_001275972; NP_001275973; NP_001275974; NP_001275975; NP_001275976; NP_001275977; NP_001275978; NP_001304085; NP_001304086; NP_001304087; NP_001304088; NP_001304089; NP_001304090; NP_001304091; NP_006709	n/a
Location (UCSC)	Chr 6: 143.94 – 144.06 Mb	Chr 10: 13.06 – 13.13 Mb
PubMed search
- Wikidata
View/Edit Human	View/Edit Mouse

Zinc finger protein PLAGL1 is a protein that in humans is encoded by the PLAGL1 gene.

== Function ==
This gene encodes a C2H2 zinc finger protein with transactivation and DNA-binding activity. This gene has been shown to exhibit antiproliferative activities and is a tumor suppressor gene candidate. Many transcript variants encoding two different isoforms have been found for this gene.

== Interactions ==
PLAGL1 has been shown to interact with P53.
