= Bernard Crespi =

American professor at Simon Fraser University

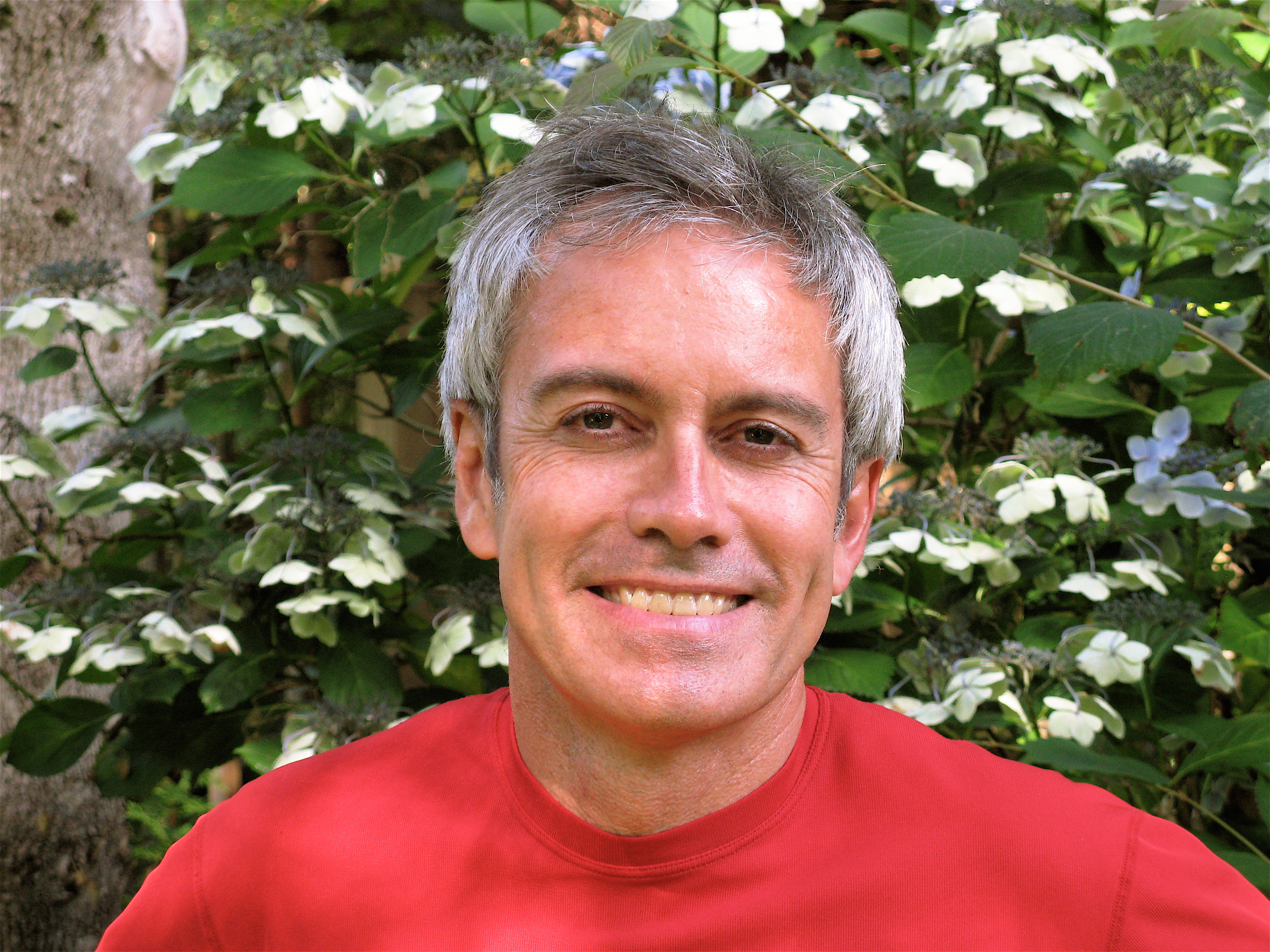

Academic background
- Education: BSc, 1980, University of Chicago; PhD., 1987, University of Michigan
- Thesis: Behavioral ecology of mycophagous Thysanoptera (1987)

Bernard Joseph Crespi FRSC is an American professor of evolutionary biology at Simon Fraser University in British Columbia, Canada. His research focuses on social evolution across multiple scales, using genetic and ecological approaches. He is one of the initiators of the imprinted brain hypothesis.

In 2010, he was elected as a fellow of the Royal Society of Canada.

== Career ==
After earning his PhD and conducting postdoctoral work in Europe, Crespi joined the faculty at Simon Fraser University in 1992. In 2006, he was the recipient of a Killam Research Fellowship.

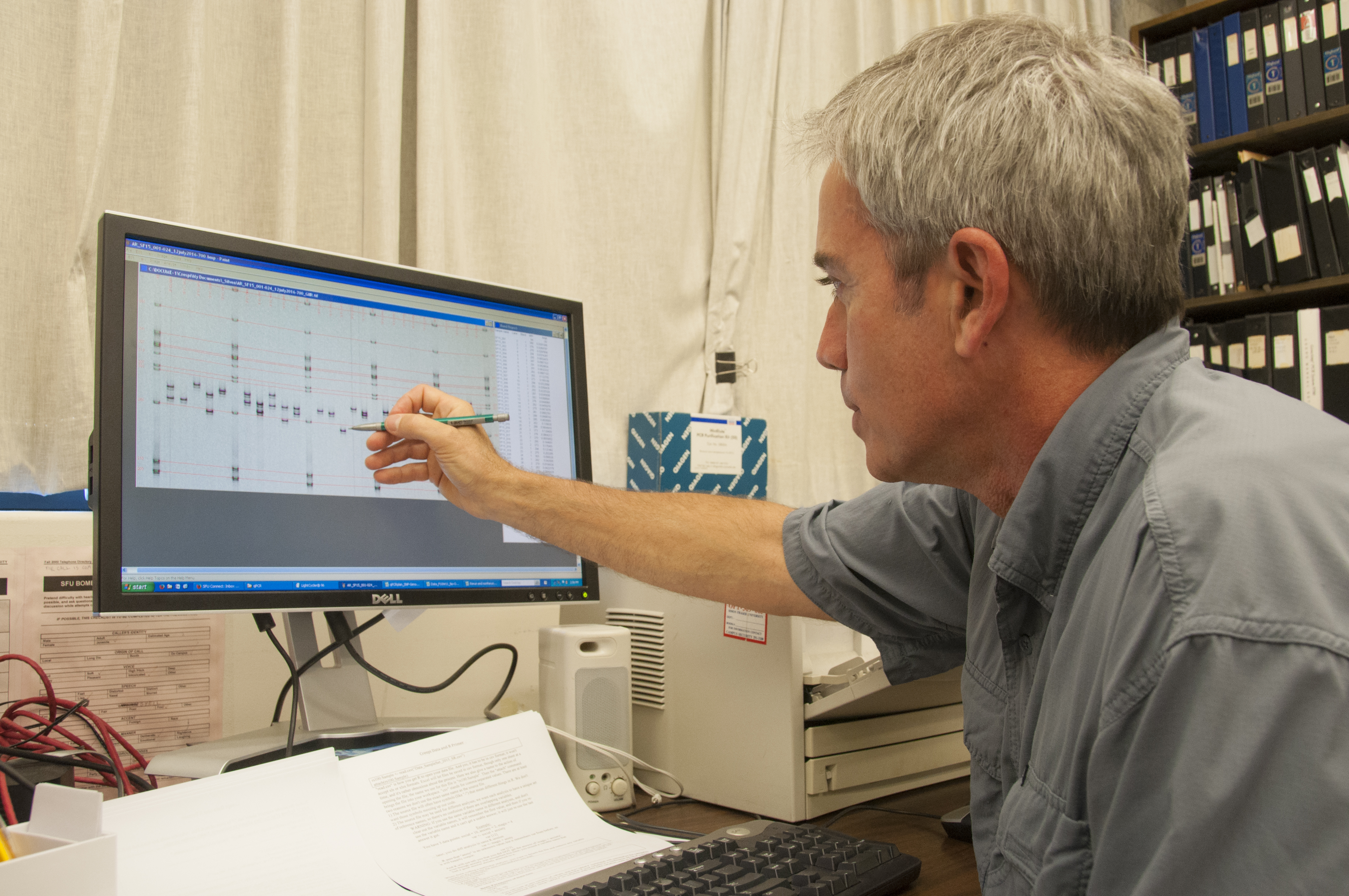

In 2008, Crespi published a paper describing observed patterns of imprinting in humans and other organisms. He explained that Genomic imprinting is an epigenetic process by which certain genes are expressed in a parent-of-origin-specific manner. The imprinted brain theory is a variant of the conflict theory of imprinting which argues that in diploid organisms, such as humans, the maternal and paternal set of genes may have antagonistic reproductive interests since the mother and father may have antagonistic interests regarding the development of the child. Following this, he was named a Fellow of the Royal Society of Canada.

In 2013, Crespi and fellow UMich alumni Kyle Summers co-edited "Human Social Evolution, The Foundational Works of Richard D. Alexander," which was published through the Oxford University Press.

In 2016, Crespi won SFU's Nora and Ted Sterling Prize in Support of Controversy for his evolutionary biology research. The next year, he conducted a study with Gerhard Gries, and Regine Gries to study the effect of natural selection on stick insects and mating. He was also selected as a Tier 1 Canada Research Chair in Evolutionary Genetics and Psychology.
