= Permanent neonatal diabetes =

Permanent neonatal diabetes mellitus
- Other names: PNDM
- Specialty: Neonatology

Permanent neonatal diabetes mellitus (PNDM) is a newly identified and potentially treatable form of monogenic diabetes. This type of neonatal diabetes is caused by activating mutations of the KCNJ11 gene, which codes for the Kir6.2 subunit of the beta cell K_{ATP} channel. This disease is considered to be a type of maturity onset diabetes of the young (MODY).

== Cause ==
It can be associated with GCK, KCNJ11, INS, and ABCC8.

== Diagnosis ==
This results in congenital impairment of insulin release, although in the past, this was always being thought to be unusually early type 1 diabetes mellitus. The insulin deficiency results in intrauterine growth retardation with birth weight small for gestational age. The diabetes is usually diagnosed in the first 3 months of life due to continuing poor weight gain, polyuria, or diabetic ketoacidosis. Rare cases have been recognized as late as 6 months of age.

== Treatment ==
Remarkably, this type of diabetes often responds well to sulfonylureas and insulin may not be necessary. More severe mutations in the KCNJ11 gene can cause early-onset diabetes which does not respond to the sulfonylurea drugs, as well as a syndrome of developmental delay and neurological features called the DEND syndrome. These forms of diabetes are very rare conditions, appearing in about 1/100,000 to 1/200,000 live births, and accounting for about 1/1000 of type 1 diabetes cases. Fewer than 5% of the cases assumed to exist have been diagnosed, and most diabetes clinics around the world are checking for KCNJ11 mutations in any persons who developed apparent insulin-dependent diabetes without the typical type 1 antibodies before 6 months of age. At least some of these people have been able to change from insulin to sulfonylurea pills after decades of injections.

== See also ==
- Transient neonatal diabetes mellitus
