= Zori–Stalker–Williams syndrome =

Genetic disease

- Other names: Pectus excavatum, macrocephaly, short stature and dysplastic nail
- Zori–Stalker–Williams syndrome has an autosomal dominant pattern of inheritance.

Zori–Stalker–Williams syndrome, also known as pectus excavatum, macrocephaly, short stature and dysplastic nails, is a rare autosomal dominant congenital disorder associated with a range of features such as pectus excavatum, macrocephaly and dysplastic nails, familial short stature, developmental delay and distinctive facies. Further signs are known to be associated with this syndrome.

The name originates from the researchers who first defined and noticed the syndrome and its clinical signs.

It is believed that the syndrome is inherited in an autosomal dominant pattern, though there has been no new research undertaken for this rare disease.
