= Zamzam–Sheriff–Phillips syndrome =

- Symptoms: Aniridia, Intellectual disability
- Risk factors: family history.

Zamzam–Sheriff–Phillips syndrome is a rare autosomal recessive congenital disorder. It is characterized by aniridia, ectopia lentis, abnormal upper incisors and intellectual disability. Little research has been undertaken regarding this particular disease, so thus far there is no known gene that affects this condition. However it has been hypothesised that the symptoms described are found at a particular gene, though intellectual disability is believed to be due to a different genetic cause.

Consanguinuity (intermarrying among relatives such as cousins), often associated with autosomal recessive inheritance, has been attributed to the inheritance of this disease.
