= Gerhard Gries =

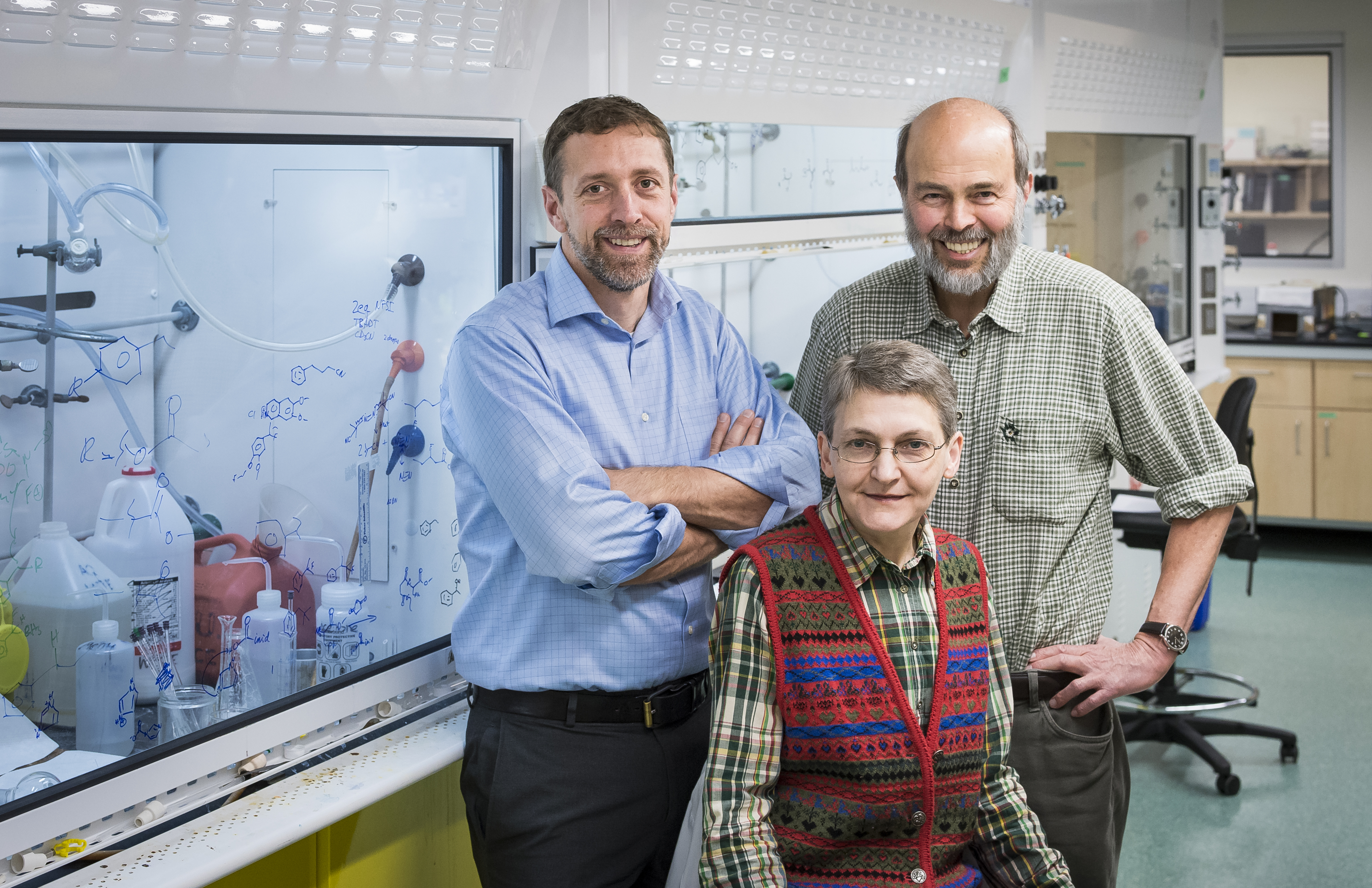
Gerhard Gries with Robert Britton and Regine Gries in 2014

Gerhard J. Gries (born 1955; Duderstadt, Germany) is a full professor of Animal Communication Ecology at the Department of Biological Sciences at Simon Fraser University.

== Education and career ==
Gries graduated from the Duderstadt Gymnasium in 1974. After serving 15 months in the German Army he studied forestry at the University of Gottingen. In 1984, Gries obtained his Ph.D. in forest entomology and became a postdoc at the Deutsche Forschungsgemeinschaft and two years later joined laboratory of John Borden at the Simon Fraser University. Following the expiration of his grant in 1988, he became a tenure-track faculty member in 1991 and only by the year 2000 became full professor. At SFU, he co-founded Gerhard and Regine Gries Lab, along with his wife Regine Gries. At the lab, he and his wife, a biologist, study various arthropods including; Araneae, Coleoptera, Diptera, Dictyoptera, Hemiptera, Hymenoptera, Lepidoptera, Phasmatodea, Strepsiptera, and Thysanura.

During his career, Gries has graduated 57 students, published 273 peer-reviewed articles on entomology, has been granted 15 patents, and produced 13 scientific films on various species of aphids, beetles and hoverflies with partnership with Institute of Scientific Film of Germany.

== Awards ==
- Entomological Society of Canada Gold Medal (2017)
- Nan-Yao Su Award (2019)
- Fellow of the Entomological Society of Canada (2019)
- Fellow of the Entomological Society of America (2019)
