= Transient neonatal diabetes =

- Transient neonatal diabetes mellitus is inherited in an autosomal dominant manner
- Specialty: Pediatrics

Transient neonatal diabetes mellitus (TNDM) is a form of neonatal diabetes presenting at birth that is not permanent. This disease is considered to be a type of maturity onset diabetes of the young (MODY).

== Types ==
Type	OMIM	Gene	Locus	Description
TNDM1	601410	ZFP57, PLAGL1	6p22.1, 6q24.2	
TNDM2	610374	ABCC8	11p15.1	Due to the mutations of the other subunit of the K_{ATP} channel, SUR1, which is encoded by the ABCC8 gene.
TNDM3	610582	KCNJ11	11p15.1	

== Cause ==
This condition has to do with genetics and is often associated with having an added Chromosome 7 gene (mostly from the paternal side).

The form on chromosome 6 can involve imprinting.

== See also ==
- Permanent neonatal diabetes mellitus
