= Zechi-Ceide syndrome =

- Other names: Occipital atretic cephalocele-unusual facies-large feet syndrome
- Symptoms: facial abnormalities, large feet and mental deficiency

Zeichi-Ceide syndrome is a rare disease discovered in 2007. It is named after its discoverer, R.M. Zeichi-Ceide, who observed three siblings born of consanguineous parents with distinctive characteristics, including facial anomalies, large feet, mental deficiency, and occipital atretic cephalocele. The investigators suspected the symptoms were caused by autosomal recessive inheritance.This means that both parents must be carriers of the defective gene for their child to be affected. However, since no specific gene mutation has been definitively identified, a molecular diagnostic test is currently unavailable.

As a rare disease, Zeichi-Ceide syndrome is registered in the Online Mendelian Inheritance in Man and the U.S. National Institutes of Health's Genetic and Rare Diseases databases.
