= ZFP57 =

Protein-coding gene in the species Homo sapiens

Identifiers
- Aliases: ZFP57, C6orf40, TNDM1, ZNF698, bA145L22, bA145L22.2, ZFP57 zinc finger protein
- External IDs: OMIM: 612192; MGI: 99204; GeneCards: ZFP57

Gene location (Human)
Chr.	Chromosome 6 (human)
Band	6p22.1	Start	29,672,483 bp
Band	6p22.1	End	29,681,155 bp

Gene location (Mouse)
Chr.	Chromosome 17 (mouse)
Band	17 B1|17	Start	37,312,055 bp
Band	17 B1|17	End	37,321,527 bp
RNA expression pattern
Bgee	Human / Mouse (ortholog); Top expressed in: gonad; C1 segment; testicle; substantia nigra; hippocampus proper; putamen; amygdala; hypothalamus; primary visual cortex; caudate nucleus / Top expressed in: secondary oocyte; genital tubercle; zygote; yolk sac; primary oocyte; neural tube; blastocyst; ventricular zone; tail of embryo; ganglionic eminence; More reference expression data
BioGPS	n/a
Gene ontology
Molecular function	DNA binding; metal ion binding; nucleic acid binding; DNA-binding transcription factor activity, RNA polymerase II-specific
Cellular component	intracellular anatomical structure; nucleus
Biological process	multicellular organism development; regulation of transcription, DNA-templated; transcription, DNA-templated; regulation of gene expression by genetic imprinting; DNA methylation involved in embryo development; regulation of transcription by RNA polymerase II
Sources:Amigo / QuickGO
Orthologs
Databases	NCBI: entry; OMA: entry
Species	Human	Mouse
Entrez	346171	22715
Ensembl	ENSG00000226858; ENSG00000204644; ENSG00000223858; ENSG00000206510; ENSG00000223852 ENSG00000227858; ENSG00000232099; ENSG00000234669	ENSMUSG00000036036
UniProt	Q9NU63	Q8C6P8
RefSeq (mRNA)	NM_001109809; NM_001366333	NM_001013745; NM_001168501; NM_001168502; NM_009559
RefSeq (protein)	NP_001103279; NP_001353262; NP_001103279.2	NP_001013767; NP_001161973; NP_001161974
Location (UCSC)	Chr 6: 29.67 – 29.68 Mb	Chr 17: 37.31 – 37.32 Mb
PubMed search
- Wikidata
View/Edit Human	View/Edit Mouse

Zinc finger protein 57 homolog (ZFP57), also known as zinc finger protein 698 (ZNF698), is a protein that in humans is encoded by the ZFP57 gene.

== Function ==
The protein encoded by this gene is a zinc finger protein containing a KRAB domain. Studies in mouse suggest that this protein may function as a transcriptional repressor.

== Clinical significance ==
Mutations in the ZFP57 gene may be associated with transient neonatal diabetes mellitus.
