= Neurofibromatosis type 4 =

- Specialty: Neurosurgery/dermatology

Neurofibromatosis type 4 (also known as "Neurofibromatosis variant type") resembles von Recklinghausen's disease, but also presents with cutaneous neurofibromas.

This is a new development in the NF family.

== See also ==
- Neurofibromatosis
- Skin lesion
