= Notalgia paresthetica =

Neuropathy causing itching between the shoulder blades

- Other names: Notalgia paraesthetica
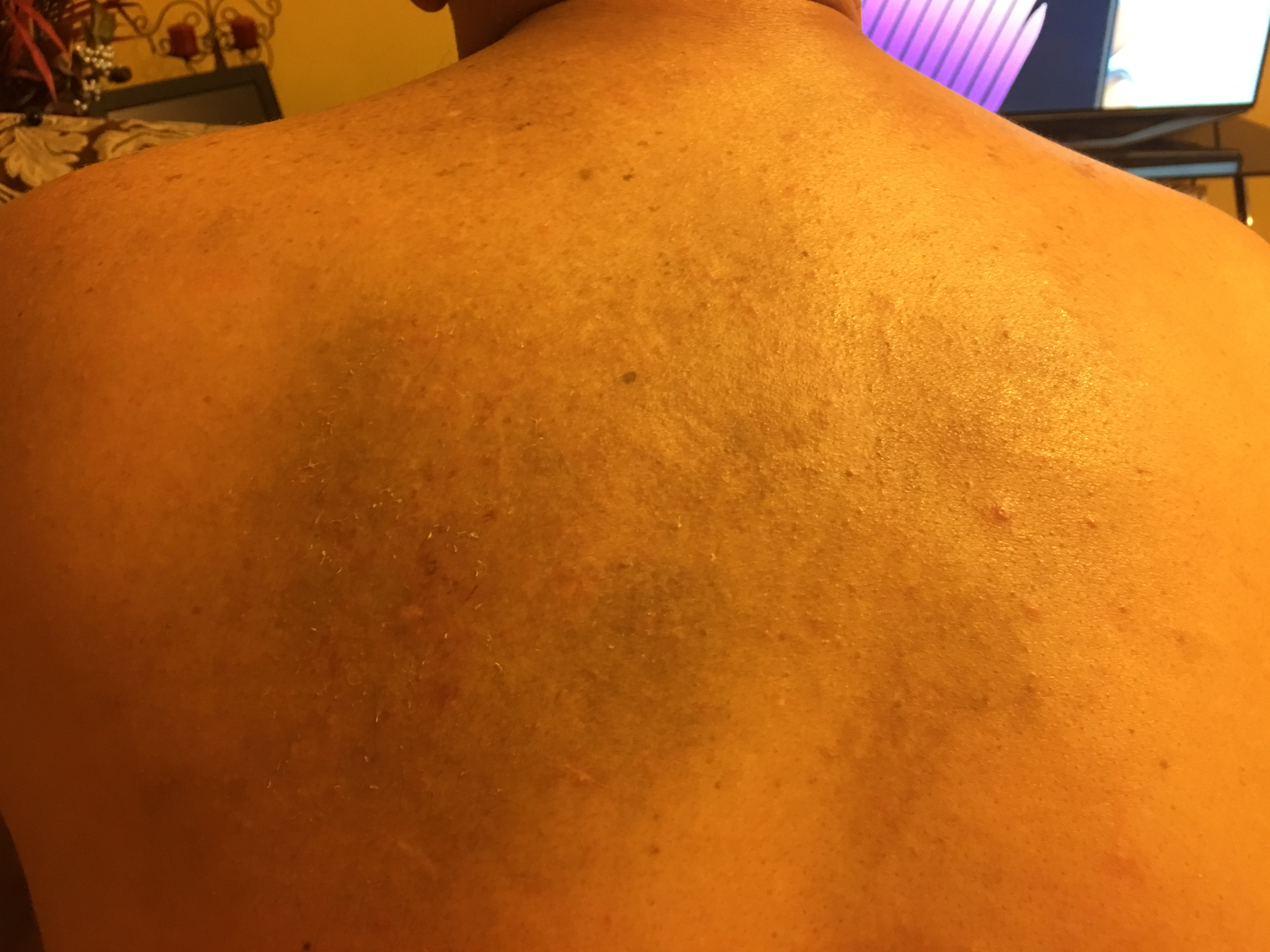
- Notalgia Paresthetica
- Specialty: Neurology

Notalgia paresthetica or notalgia paraesthetica (NP) (also known as "hereditary localized pruritus", "posterior pigmented pruritic patch", and "subscapular pruritus") is a chronic sensory neuropathy. Notalgia paresthetica is a common localized itch, affecting mainly the area between the shoulder blades (especially the T2–T6 dermatomes) but occasionally with a more widespread distribution, involving the shoulders, back, and upper chest. The characteristic symptom is pruritus (itch or sensation that makes a person want to scratch) on the back, usually on the left hand side below the shoulder blade (mid to upper back). It is occasionally accompanied by pain, paresthesia (pins and needles), or hyperesthesia (unusual or pathologically increased sensitivity of the skin to sensory stimuli, such as pain, heat, cold, or touch), which results in a well circumscribed hyperpigmentation of a skin patch in the affected area.

== Causes ==
The causes of this condition have not yet been completely defined. Patients are usually older persons.

The correlation of notalgia paresthetica localization with corresponding degenerative changes in the spine suggests that spinal nerve impingement may be a contributing cause. According to Plete and Massey, "The posterior rami of spinal nerves arising in T2 through T6 are unique in that they pursue a right-angle course through the multifidus spinae muscle, and this particular circumstance may predispose them to harm from otherwise innocuous insults of a varied nature." Patients may have other conditions that predispose them to peripheral neuropathies (nerve damage).

== Diagnosis ==
Possible differential diagnoses are:

- Allergic contact dermatitis
- Arthropod bite reaction
- Atopic Dermatitis
- Brachioradial pruritus
- Delusions of Parasitosis
- Drug eruptions
- Herpes Zoster
- Impetigo
- Irritant contact dermatitis
- Lichen simplex chronicus
- Neurodermatitis
- Postinflammatory hyperpigmentation
- Prurigo nodularis
- Pruritus and systemic disease
- Tinea corporis
- Tinea Versicolor
- Xerosis

== Treatment ==
Therapy for notalgia paresthetica is directed at controlling symptoms, as no cure exists for the condition. Available treatments include local anesthetics, topical capsaicin, topical corticosteroids, hydroxyzine, oxcarbazepine, palmitoylethanolamide and gabapentin. Paravertebral nerve block and botulinum toxin injections may also be helpful.

Some patients treated with low concentration topical capsaicin reported pain, burning, or tingling sensations with treatment, and symptoms returned within a month of ceasing treatment. Oxcarbazepine was reported to reduce the severity of symptoms in a few cases. One patient has been treated with "paravertebral nerve blocks, with bupivacaine and methylprednisolone acetate injected into the T3–T4 and T5–T6 intervertebral spaces" Hydroxyzine has also been used with considerable success in some cases as long as the pills are used daily.

High concentration topical capsaicin (8%, Qutenza) have been shown to be highly effective in treating neuropathic itch in some patients (including notalgia paresthetica) as well as in a recent proof-of-concept study.

Most recently intradermal injections of botulinum toxin type A (Botox) have been tried with some success. Even though botulinum normally wears off in three to six months, the treatment appears to be long term, and it has been theorised that botulinum type A effects lasting change in pain signaling.

== See also ==
- List of cutaneous conditions
- Hereditary neuralgic amyotrophy
