= PLAG1 =

Protein-coding gene in the species Homo sapiens

Identifiers
- Aliases: PLAG1, PSA, SGPA, ZNF912, PLAG1 zinc finger, SRS4
- External IDs: OMIM: 603026; MGI: 1891916; GeneCards: PLAG1

Gene location (Human)
Chr.	Chromosome 8 (human)
Band	8q12.1	Start	56,160,909 bp
Band	8q12.1	End	56,211,324 bp

Gene location (Mouse)
Chr.	Chromosome 4 (mouse)
Band	4|4 A1	Start	3,900,996 bp
Band	4|4 A1	End	3,938,423 bp
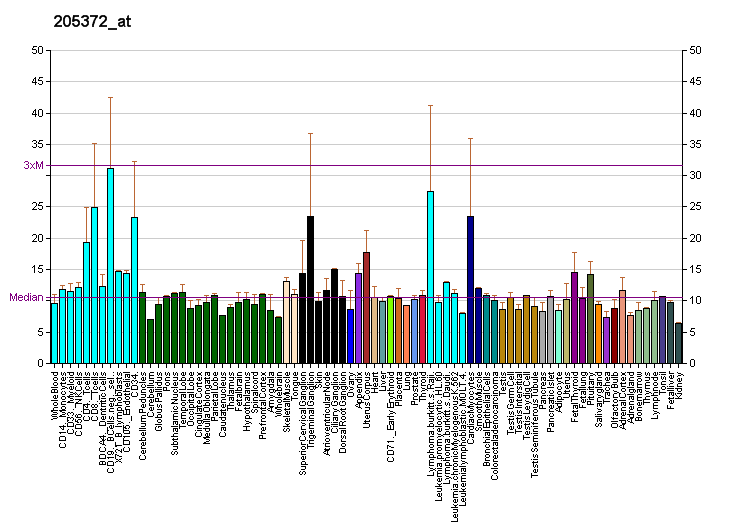
RNA expression pattern
Bgee	Human / Mouse (ortholog); Top expressed in: secondary oocyte; amniotic fluid; testicle; stromal cell of endometrium; gonad; epithelium of nasopharynx; right uterine tube; retinal pigment epithelium; ventricular zone; palpebral conjunctiva / Top expressed in: zygote; secondary oocyte; genital tubercle; tail of embryo; female urethra; epithelium of seminiferous tubule of testis; primary oocyte; male urethra; photoreceptor layer of retina; theca folliculi; More reference expression data
BioGPS	More reference expression data
Gene ontology
Molecular function	RNA polymerase II cis-regulatory region sequence-specific DNA binding; DNA binding; DNA-binding transcription activator activity, RNA polymerase II-specific; metal ion binding; nucleic acid binding; DNA-binding transcription factor activity; DNA-binding transcription factor activity, RNA polymerase II-specific
Cellular component	nucleus; nuclear speck
Biological process	prostate gland growth; gland morphogenesis; positive regulation of gene expression; positive regulation of glial cell proliferation; regulation of transcription, DNA-templated; organ growth; negative regulation of gene expression; positive regulation of transcription by RNA polymerase II; multicellular organism growth; transcription, DNA-templated; transcription by RNA polymerase II; apoptotic process
Sources:Amigo / QuickGO
Orthologs
Databases	NCBI: entry; OMA: entry
Species	Human	Mouse
Entrez	5324	56711
Ensembl	ENSG00000181690	ENSMUSG00000003282
UniProt	Q6DJT9	Q9QYE0
RefSeq (mRNA)	NM_001114634; NM_001114635; NM_002655	NM_019969
RefSeq (protein)	NP_001108106; NP_001108107; NP_002646	NP_064353
Location (UCSC)	Chr 8: 56.16 – 56.21 Mb	Chr 4: 3.9 – 3.94 Mb
PubMed search
- Wikidata
View/Edit Human	View/Edit Mouse

Zinc finger protein PLAG1 is a protein that in humans is encoded by the PLAG1 gene.

== Function ==
Pleomorphic adenoma gene 1 encodes a zinc finger protein with 2 putative nuclear localization signals. PLAG1, which is developmentally regulated, has been shown to be consistently rearranged in pleomorphic adenomas of the salivary glands. PLAG1 is activated by the reciprocal chromosomal translocations involving 8q12 in a subset of salivary gland pleomorphic adenomas.

== Interactions ==
PLAG1 has been shown to interact with Karyopherin alpha 2.
