= Genomic imprinting =

Expression of genes depending on parentage

Genomic imprinting is an epigenetic phenomenon that causes genes to be expressed or not, depending on whether they are inherited from the female or male parent. Genes can also be partially imprinted. Partial imprinting occurs when alleles from both parents are differently expressed rather than complete expression and complete suppression of one parent's allele. Forms of genomic imprinting have been demonstrated in fungi, plants and animals. As of 2019, 260 imprinted genes have been reported in mice and 228 in humans.

Genomic imprinting is an inheritance process independent of the classical Mendelian inheritance. It is an epigenetic process that involves DNA methylation and histone methylation without altering the genetic sequence. These epigenetic marks are established ("imprinted") in the germline (sperm or egg cells) of the parents and are maintained through mitotic cell divisions in the somatic cells of an organism.

Appropriate imprinting of certain genes is important for normal development. Human diseases involving genomic imprinting include Angelman, Prader–Willi, and Beckwith–Wiedemann syndromes. Methylation defects have also been associated with male infertility.

== Overview ==
In diploid organisms (like humans), the somatic cells possess two copies of the genome, one inherited from the male and one from the female. Each autosomal gene is therefore represented by two copies, or alleles, with one copy inherited from each parent at fertilization. The expressed allele is dependent upon its parental origin. For example, the gene encoding insulin-like growth factor 2 (IGF2/Igf2) is only expressed from the allele inherited from the male. Although imprinting accounts for a small proportion of mammalian genes, they play an important role in embryogenesis particularly in the formation of visceral structures and the nervous system.

The term "imprinting" was first used to describe events in the insect Pseudococcus nipae. In Pseudococcids (mealybugs) (Hemiptera, Coccoidea) both the male and female develop from a fertilised egg. In females, all chromosomes remain euchromatic and functional. In embryos destined to become males, one haploid set of chromosomes becomes heterochromatinised after the sixth cleavage division and remains so in most tissues; males are thus functionally haploid.

== Imprinted genes in mammals ==
That imprinting might be a feature of mammalian development was suggested in breeding experiments in mice carrying reciprocal chromosomal translocations. Nucleus transplantation experiments in mouse zygotes in the early 1980s confirmed that normal development requires the contribution of both the maternal and paternal genomes. The vast majority of mouse embryos derived from parthenogenesis (called parthenogenones, with two maternal or egg genomes) and androgenesis (called androgenones, with two paternal or sperm genomes) die at or before the blastocyst/implantation stage. In the rare instances that they develop to postimplantation stages, gynogenetic embryos show better embryonic development relative to placental development, while for androgenones, the reverse is true. Nevertheless, for the latter, only a few have been described (in a 1984 paper). Nevertheless, in 2018 genome editing allowed for bipaternal and viable bimaternal mouse and even (in 2022) parthenogenesis, still this is far from full reimprinting. Finally in March 2023 viable bipaternal embryos were created.

No naturally occurring cases of parthenogenesis exist in mammals because of imprinted genes. However, in 2004, experimental manipulation by Japanese researchers of a paternal methylation imprint controlling the Igf2 gene led to the birth of a mouse (named Kaguya) with two maternal sets of chromosomes, though it is not a true parthenogenone since cells from two different female mice were used. The researchers were able to succeed by using one egg from an immature parent, thus reducing maternal imprinting, and modifying it to express the gene Igf2, which is normally only expressed by the paternal copy of the gene.

Parthenogenetic/gynogenetic embryos have twice the normal expression level of maternally derived genes, and lack expression of paternally expressed genes, while the reverse is true for androgenetic embryos. It is now known that there are at least 80 imprinted genes in humans and mice, many of which are involved in embryonic and placental growth and development. Hybrid offspring of two species may exhibit unusual growth due to the novel combination of imprinted genes.

Various methods have been used to identify imprinted genes. In swine, Bischoff et al. compared transcriptional profiles using DNA microarrays to survey differentially expressed genes between parthenotes (2 maternal genomes) and control fetuses (1 maternal, 1 paternal genome). An intriguing study surveying the transcriptome of murine brain tissues revealed over 1300 imprinted gene loci (approximately 10-fold more than previously reported) by RNA-sequencing from F1 hybrids resulting from reciprocal crosses. The result however has been challenged by others who claimed that this is an overestimation by an order of magnitude due to flawed statistical analysis.

In domesticated livestock, single-nucleotide polymorphisms in imprinted genes influencing foetal growth and development have been shown to be associated with economically important production traits in cattle, sheep and pigs.

=== Genetic mapping of imprinted genes ===
At the same time as the generation of the gynogenetic and androgenetic embryos discussed above, mouse embryos were also being generated that contained only small regions that were derived from either a paternal or maternal source. The generation of a series of such uniparental disomies, which together span the entire genome, allowed the creation of an imprinting map. Those regions which when inherited from a single parent result in a discernible phenotype contain imprinted gene(s). Further research showed that within these regions there were often numerous imprinted genes. Around 80% of imprinted genes are found in clusters such as these, called imprinted domains, suggesting a level of co-ordinated control. More recently, genome-wide screens to identify imprinted genes have used differential expression of mRNAs from control fetuses and parthenogenetic or androgenetic fetuses hybridized to gene expression profiling microarrays, allele-specific gene expression using SNP genotyping microarrays, transcriptome sequencing, and in silico prediction pipelines.

=== Imprinting mechanisms ===
Imprinting is a dynamic process. It must be possible to erase and re-establish imprints through each generation so that genes that are imprinted in an adult may still be expressed in that adult's offspring. (For example, the maternal genes that control insulin production will be imprinted in a male but will be expressed in any of the male's offspring that inherit these genes.) The nature of imprinting must therefore be epigenetic rather than DNA sequence dependent. In germline cells the imprint is erased and then re-established according to the sex of the individual, i.e. in the developing sperm (during spermatogenesis), a paternal imprint is established, whereas in developing oocytes (oogenesis), a maternal imprint is established. This process of erasure and reprogramming is necessary such that the germ cell imprinting status is relevant to the sex of the individual. In both plants and mammals there are two major mechanisms that are involved in establishing the imprint; these are DNA methylation and histone modifications.

Recently, a new study has suggested a novel inheritable imprinting mechanism in humans that would be specific of placental tissue and that is independent of DNA methylation (the main and classical mechanism for genomic imprinting). This was observed in humans, but not in mice, suggesting development after the evolutionary divergence of humans and mice, ~80 Mya. Among the hypothetical explanations for this novel phenomenon, two possible mechanisms have been proposed: either a histone modification that confers imprinting at novel placental-specific imprinted loci or, alternatively, a recruitment of DNMTs to these loci by a specific and unknown transcription factor that would be expressed during early trophoblast differentiation.

=== Regulation ===
The grouping of imprinted genes within clusters allows them to share common regulatory elements, such as non-coding RNAs and differentially methylated regions (DMRs). When these regulatory elements control the imprinting of one or more genes, they are known as imprinting control regions (ICR). The expression of non-coding RNAs, such as antisense Igf2r RNA (Air) on mouse chromosome 17 and KCNQ1OT1 on human chromosome 11p15.5, have been shown to be essential for the imprinting of genes in their corresponding regions.

Differentially methylated regions are generally segments of DNA rich in cytosine and guanine nucleotides, with the cytosine nucleotides methylated on one copy but not on the other. Contrary to expectation, methylation does not necessarily mean silencing; instead, the effect of methylation depends upon the default state of the region.

=== Functions of imprinted genes ===
The control of expression of specific genes by genomic imprinting is unique to therian mammals (placental mammals and marsupials) and flowering plants. Imprinting of whole chromosomes has been reported in mealybugs (Genus: Pseudococcus) and a fungus gnat (Sciara). It has also been established that X-chromosome inactivation occurs in an imprinted manner in the extra-embryonic tissues of mice and all tissues in marsupials, where it is always the paternal X-chromosome which is silenced.

The majority of imprinted genes in mammals have been found to have roles in the control of embryonic growth and development, including development of the placenta. Other imprinted genes are involved in post-natal development, with roles affecting suckling and metabolism.

=== Hypotheses on the origins of imprinting ===
A widely accepted hypothesis for the evolution of genomic imprinting is the "parental conflict hypothesis". Also known as the kinship theory of genomic imprinting, this hypothesis states that the inequality between parental genomes due to imprinting is a result of the differing interests of each parent in terms of the evolutionary fitness of their genes. The father's genes that encode for imprinting gain greater fitness through the success of the offspring, at the expense of the mother. The mother's evolutionary imperative is often to conserve resources for her own survival while providing sufficient nourishment to current and subsequent litters. Accordingly, paternally expressed genes tend to be growth-promoting whereas maternally expressed genes tend to be growth-limiting. In support of this hypothesis, genomic imprinting has been found in all placental mammals, where post-fertilisation offspring resource consumption at the expense of the mother is high; although it has also been found in oviparous birds where there is relatively little post-fertilisation resource transfer and therefore less parental conflict. A small number of imprinted genes are fast evolving under positive Darwinian selection possibly due to antagonistic co-evolution. The majority of imprinted genes display high levels of micro-synteny conservation and have undergone very few duplications in placental mammalian lineages.

However, our understanding of the molecular mechanisms behind genomic imprinting show that it is the maternal genome that controls much of the imprinting of both its own and the paternally-derived genes in the zygote, making it difficult to explain why the maternal genes would willingly relinquish their dominance to that of the paternally-derived genes in light of the conflict hypothesis.

Another hypothesis proposed is that some imprinted genes act coadaptively to improve both fetal development and maternal provisioning for nutrition and care. In it, a subset of paternally expressed genes are co-expressed in both the placenta and the mother's hypothalamus. This would come about through selective pressure from parent-infant coadaptation to improve infant survival. Paternally expressed 3 (PEG3) is a gene for which this hypothesis may apply.

Others have approached their study of the origins of genomic imprinting from a different side, arguing that natural selection is operating on the role of epigenetic marks as machinery for homologous chromosome recognition during meiosis, rather than on their role in differential expression. This argument centers on the existence of epigenetic effects on chromosomes that do not directly affect gene expression, but do depend on which parent the chromosome originated from. This group of epigenetic changes that depend on the chromosome's parent of origin (including both those that affect gene expression and those that do not) are called parental origin effects, and include phenomena such as paternal X inactivation in the marsupials, nonrandom parental chromatid distribution in the ferns, and even mating type switching in yeast. This diversity in organisms that show parental origin effects has prompted theorists to place the evolutionary origin of genomic imprinting before the last common ancestor of plants and animals, over a billion years ago.

Natural selection for genomic imprinting requires genetic variation in a population. A hypothesis for the origin of this genetic variation states that the host-defense system responsible for silencing foreign DNA elements, such as genes of viral origin, mistakenly silenced genes whose silencing turned out to be beneficial for the organism. There appears to be an over-representation of retrotransposed genes, that is to say genes that are inserted into the genome by viruses, among imprinted genes. It has also been postulated that if the retrotransposed gene is inserted close to another imprinted gene, it may just acquire this imprint.

== Imprinted loci phenotypic signatures ==
Unfortunately, the relationship between the phenotype and genotype of imprinted genes is solely conceptual. The idea is frameworked using two alleles on a single locus and hosts three different possible classes of genotypes. The reciprocal heterozygotes genotype class contributes to understanding how imprinting will impact genotype to phenotype relationship. Reciprocal heterozygotes have a genetically equivalent, but they are phenotypically nonequivalent. Their phenotype may not be dependent on the equivalence of the genotype. This can ultimately increase diversity in genetic classes, expanding flexibility of imprinted genes. This increase will also force a higher degree in testing capabilities and assortment of tests to determine the presences of imprinting.

When a locus is identified as imprinted, two different classes express different alleles. Inherited imprinted genes of offspring are believed to be monoallelic expressions. A single locus will entirely produce one's phenotype although two alleles are inherited. This genotype class is called parental imprinting, as well as dominant imprinting. Phenotypic patterns are variant to possible expressions from paternal and maternal genotypes. Different alleles inherited from different parents will host different phenotypic qualities. One allele will have a larger phenotypic value and the other allele will be silenced. Underdominance of the locus is another possibility of phenotypic expression. Both maternal and paternal phenotypes will have a small value rather than one hosting a large value and silencing the other.

Statistical frameworks and mapping models are used to identify imprinting effects on genes and complex traits. Allelic parent-of-origin influences the vary in phenotype that derive from the imprinting of genotype classes. These models of mapping and identifying imprinting effects include using unordered genotypes to build mapping models. These models will show classic quantitative genetics and the effects of dominance of the imprinted genes.

== Human disorders associated with imprinting ==
Imprinting may cause problems in cloning, with clones having DNA that is not methylated in the correct positions. It is possible that this is due to a lack of time for reprogramming to be completely achieved. When a nucleus is added to an egg during somatic cell nuclear transfer, the egg starts dividing in minutes, as compared to the days or months it takes for reprogramming during embryonic development. If time is the responsible factor, it may be possible to delay cell division in clones, giving time for proper reprogramming to occur.

In vitro fertilisation, including ICSI, is associated with an increased risk of imprinting disorders, with an odds ratio of 3.7 (95% confidence interval 1.4 to 9.7).

=== Male infertility ===
Epigenetic deregulations at H19 imprinted gene in sperm have been observed associated with male infertility. Indeed, methylation loss at H19 imprinted gene has been observed associated with MTHFR gene promoter hypermethylation in semen samples from infertile males.

=== Prader-Willi/Angelman ===
The first imprinted genetic disorders to be described in humans were the reciprocally inherited Prader-Willi syndrome and Angelman syndrome. Both syndromes are associated with loss of the chromosomal region 15q11-13 (band 11 of the long arm of chromosome 15). This region contains the paternally expressed genes SNRPN and NDN and the maternally expressed gene UBE3A.

- Paternal inheritance of a deletion of this region is associated with Prader-Willi syndrome (characterised by hypotonia, obesity, and hypogonadism).
- Maternal inheritance of the same deletion is associated with Angelman syndrome (characterised by epilepsy, tremors, and a perpetually smiling facial expression).

=== Potential involvement in autism and schizophrenia ===
The imprinted brain hypothesis is a hypothesis in evolutionary psychology regarding the causes of autism spectrum and schizophrenia spectrum disorders, first presented by Bernard Crespi and Christopher Badcock in 2008. It hypothesizes that genomic imprinting effects contribute, to some degree, to the diametric (opposite) nature of autism and psychosis (the diametric disorders hypothesis, which is much more general than the imprinted brain idea).

The imprinted brain hypothesis is based around genomic imprinting, an epigenetic process through which genes are expressed differently depending upon which parent they are inherited from. Specifically, the imprinted brain hypothesis proposes that autism spectrum disorders are caused to some degree by biases towards paternal gene expression, while psychosis spectrum disorders are caused in some cases by biases towards maternal gene expression.

The imprinted brain hypothesis is supported by high rates of autism in Angelman syndrome (which is due to paternal imprinted gene biases) and high rates of psychosis in Prader-Willi-syndrome (which is due to maternal imprinted gene biases).

The diametric disorders hypothesis and the imprinted brain hypothesis have been subject to considerable research and testing, with considerable support and some non-supportive evidence, e.g., .

=== DIRAS3 (NOEY2 or ARH1) ===
DIRAS3 is a paternally expressed and maternally imprinted gene located on chromosome 1 in humans. Reduced DIRAS3 expression is linked to an increased risk of ovarian and breast cancers; in 41% of breast and ovarian cancers the protein encoded by DIRAS3 is not expressed, suggesting that it functions as a tumor suppressor gene. Therefore, if uniparental disomy occurs and a person inherits both chromosomes from the mother, the gene will not be expressed and the individual is put at a greater risk for breast and ovarian cancer.

=== Other ===
Other conditions involving imprinting include Beckwith-Wiedemann syndrome, Silver-Russell syndrome, and pseudohypoparathyroidism.

Transient neonatal diabetes mellitus can also involve imprinting.

== Imprinted genes in other animals ==
In insects, imprinting affects entire chromosomes. In some insects the entire paternal genome is silenced in male offspring, and thus is involved in sex determination. The imprinting produces effects similar to the mechanisms in other insects that eliminate paternally inherited chromosomes in male offspring, including arrhenotoky.

In social honey bees, the parent of origin and allele-specific genes has been studied from reciprocal crosses to explore the epigenetic mechanisms underlying aggressive behavior.

In placental species, parent-offspring conflict can result in the evolution of strategies, such as genomic imprinting, for embryos to subvert maternal nutrient provisioning. Despite several attempts to find it, genomic imprinting has not been found in the platypus, reptiles, birds, or fish. The absence of genomic imprinting in a placental reptile, the Pseudemoia entrecasteauxii, is interesting as genomic imprinting was thought to be associated with the evolution of viviparity and placental nutrient transport.

Studies in domestic livestock, such as dairy and beef cattle, have implicated imprinted genes (e.g. IGF2) in a range of economic traits, including dairy performance in Holstein-Friesian cattle.

In sheep, the CLPG gene ("callipyge" from Greek, meaning "beautiful buttocks") produces a large buttocks consisting of muscle with very little fat. The large-buttocked phenotype only occurs when the allele is present on the copy of chromosome 18 inherited from a sheep's father and is not on the copy of chromosome 18 inherited from that sheep's mother. The CLPG locus is encompassed by Dlk1-Gtl2, an imprinted region of the mammalian genome, and the atypical presentation of this gene is a result of this imprinting.

=== Mouse foraging behavior ===
Foraging behavior in mice studied is influenced by a sexually dimorphic allele expression implicating a cross-gender imprinting influence that varies throughout the body and may dominate expression and shape a behavior.

== Imprinted genes in plants ==
A similar imprinting phenomenon has also been described in flowering plants (angiosperms). During fertilization of the egg cell, a second, separate fertilization event gives rise to the endosperm, an extraembryonic structure that nourishes the embryo in a manner analogous to the mammalian placenta. Unlike the embryo, the endosperm is often formed from the fusion of two maternal cells with a male gamete. This results in a triploid genome. The 2:1 ratio of maternal to paternal genomes appears to be critical for seed development. Some genes are found to be expressed from both maternal genomes while others are expressed exclusively from the lone paternal copy. It has been suggested that these imprinted genes are responsible for the triploid block effect in flowering plants that prevents hybridization between diploids and autotetraploids. Several computational methods to detect imprinting genes in plants from reciprocal crosses have been proposed.

== See also ==
- Bookmarking
- Female sperm
- Male egg
- Metabolic imprinting
- Original antigenic sin, immunological imprinting
