= Zonular cataract and nystagmus =

Rare congenital disease of the eye

- Other names: Early-onset non-syndromic cataract
- Specialty: Medical genetics

Zonular cataract and nystagmus, also referred as nystagmus with congenital zonular cataract, is a rare congenital disease associated with Nystagmus and zonular cataract of the eye.

== Genetics ==
It has been suggested that the disease follows an X-linked pattern of inheritance though studies done on this particular disease are few.
