= C2H2 =

C2H2 may mean:

== Molecular formulae ==
The molecular formula C_{2}H_{2} (molar mass: 26.04 g/mol, exact mass: 26.01565 u) may refer to:

- Acetylene (or ethyne)
- Methylidenecarbene
- Vinylidene group

== Transcription factors ==
- C2H2 zinc finger, short for Cys_{2}His_{2} a class of transcription factors with the small protein structural motif stabilised with Zinc ions
