= ZNF71 =

Protein-coding gene in the species Homo sapiens

Identifiers
- Aliases: ZNF71, EZFIT, zinc finger protein 71
- External IDs: OMIM: 194545; GeneCards: ZNF71

Gene location (Human)
Chr.	Chromosome 19 (human)
Band	19q13.43	Start	56,595,300 bp
Band	19q13.43	End	56,626,481 bp
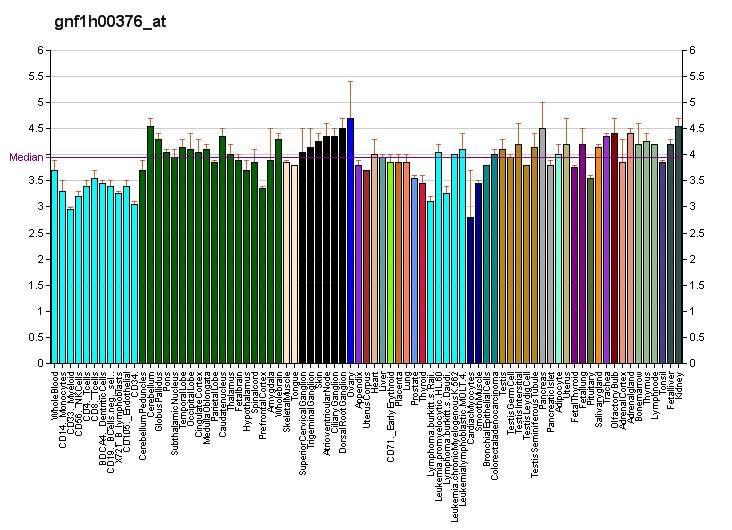

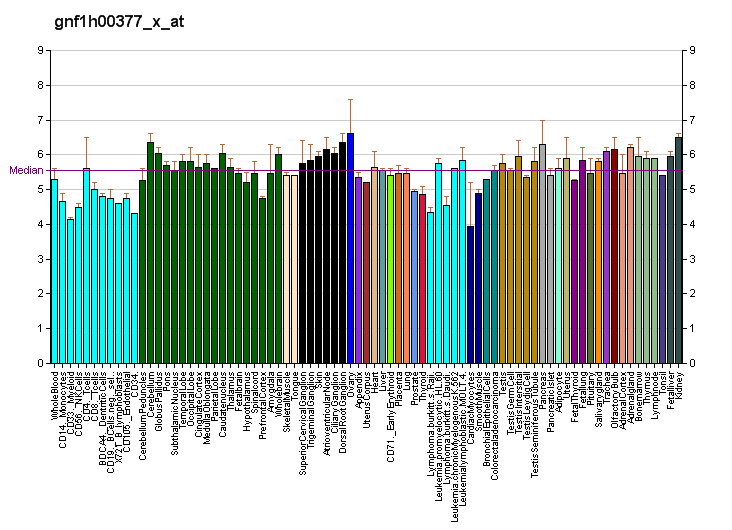
RNA expression pattern
Bgee	Human / Mouse (ortholog); Top expressed in: gonad; ganglionic eminence; testicle; stromal cell of endometrium; ventricular zone; granulocyte; apex of heart; secondary oocyte; gastrocnemius muscle; popliteal artery / n/a; More reference expression data
BioGPS	More reference expression data
Gene ontology
Molecular function	DNA-binding transcription factor activity; DNA binding; metal ion binding; nucleic acid binding; DNA-binding transcription factor activity, RNA polymerase II-specific; sequence-specific DNA binding
Cellular component	nucleus; nucleoplasm
Biological process	regulation of transcription, DNA-templated; transcription, DNA-templated; regulation of transcription by RNA polymerase II; negative regulation of transcription, DNA-templated; positive regulation of transcription, DNA-templated; positive regulation of transcription by RNA polymerase II
Sources:Amigo / QuickGO
Orthologs
Databases	NCBI: entry; OMA: entry
Species	Human	Mouse
Entrez	58491	n/a
Ensembl	ENSG00000197951	n/a
UniProt	Q9NQZ8	n/a
RefSeq (mRNA)	NM_021216; NM_001370214; NM_001370215	n/a
RefSeq (protein)	NP_067039; NP_001357143; NP_001357144	n/a
Location (UCSC)	Chr 19: 56.6 – 56.63 Mb	n/a
PubMed search		n/a
- Wikidata
View/Edit Human

Endothelial zinc finger protein induced by tumor necrosis factor alpha is a protein that in humans is encoded by the ZNF71 gene.
