= PTOV1 =

Protein-coding gene in the species Homo sapiens

Identifiers
- Aliases: PTOV1, ACID2, PTOV-1, prostate tumor overexpressed 1, extended AT-hook containing adaptor protein, PTOV1 extended AT-hook containing adaptor protein
- External IDs: OMIM: 610195; MGI: 1933946; HomoloGene: 9687; GeneCards: PTOV1; OMA:PTOV1 - orthologs

Gene location (Human)
| Chr. | Chromosome 19 (human) |
| Band | 19q13.33 | Start | 49,850,735 bp |
| Band | 19q13.33 | End | 49,860,744 bp |

Gene location (Mouse)
| Chr. | Chromosome 7 (mouse) |
| Band | 7 B3|7 | Start | 44,512,491 bp |
| Band | 7 B3|7 | End | 44,519,212 bp |
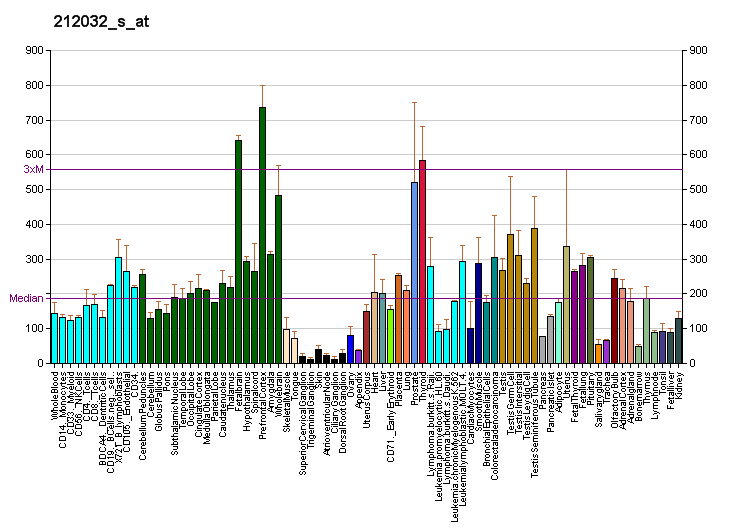
RNA expression pattern
| Bgee | Human / Mouse (ortholog); Top expressed in: ganglionic eminence; ventricular zone; right uterine tube; right hemisphere of cerebellum; anterior pituitary; right testis; left testis; right adrenal gland; right adrenal cortex; left adrenal cortex / Top expressed in: ventricular zone; entorhinal cortex; perirhinal cortex; CA3 field; choroid plexus of fourth ventricle; lactiferous gland; dentate gyrus of hippocampal formation granule cell; primary visual cortex; superior frontal gyrus; molar; More reference expression data |
| BioGPS | More reference expression data |
Orthologs
| Species | Human | Mouse |
| Entrez | 53635 | 84113 |
| Ensembl | ENSG00000104960 | ENSMUSG00000038502 |
| UniProt | Q86YD1 | Q91VU8 |
| RefSeq (mRNA) | NM_001305105; NM_001305108; NM_017432; NM_001364745; NM_001364747 NM_001364748; NM_001364749; NM_001364750; NM_001394010 | NM_133949 |
| RefSeq (protein) | NP_001292034; NP_001292037; NP_059128; NP_001351674; NP_001351676 NP_001351677; NP_001351678; NP_001351679 | NP_598710 |
| Location (UCSC) | Chr 19: 49.85 – 49.86 Mb | Chr 7: 44.51 – 44.52 Mb |
| PubMed search |
- Wikidata
| View/Edit Human | View/Edit Mouse |

Prostate tumor overexpressed gene 1 protein is a protein that in humans is encoded by the PTOV1 gene.
