= Ets variant 2 =

Protein-coding gene in the species Homo sapiens

ETV2

Identifiers
- Aliases: ETV2, ER71, ETSRP71, Ets variant 2, ETS variant transcription factor 2
- External IDs: OMIM: 609358; MGI: 99253; GeneCards: ETV2

Gene location (Human)
Chr.	Chromosome 19 (human)
Band	19q13.12	Start	35,641,745 bp
Band	19q13.12	End	35,644,871 bp

Gene location (Mouse)
Chr.	Chromosome 7 (mouse)
Band	7|7 B1	Start	30,333,041 bp
Band	7|7 B1	End	30,335,277 bp
RNA expression pattern
Bgee	Human / Mouse (ortholog); Top expressed in: left testis; right testis; testicle; mucosa of transverse colon; stromal cell of endometrium; granulocyte; right lobe of liver; skin of abdomen; body of pancreas; skin of leg / Top expressed in: embryo; urethra; male urethra; primitive streak; morula; epiblast; embryo; seminiferous tubule; blastocyst; pharynx; More reference expression data
BioGPS	n/a
Gene ontology
Molecular function	DNA binding; sequence-specific DNA binding; DNA-binding transcription factor activity; DNA-binding transcription activator activity, RNA polymerase II-specific; RNA polymerase II cis-regulatory region sequence-specific DNA binding; DNA-binding transcription factor activity, RNA polymerase II-specific
Cellular component	nucleus
Biological process	Notch signaling pathway; cell differentiation; positive regulation of endothelial cell differentiation; regulation of transcription, DNA-templated; blood vessel morphogenesis; placenta development; regulation of transcription by RNA polymerase II; mesoderm formation; in utero embryonic development; Wnt signaling pathway; transcription by RNA polymerase II; positive regulation of mesoderm development; positive regulation of gene expression; BMP signaling pathway involved in mesodermal cell fate specification; erythrocyte differentiation; blastocyst development; positive regulation of transcription by RNA polymerase II; hemopoiesis
Sources:Amigo / QuickGO
Orthologs
Databases	NCBI: entry; OMA: entry
Species	Human	Mouse
Entrez	2116	14008
Ensembl	ENSG00000105672	ENSMUSG00000006311
UniProt	O00321	P41163
RefSeq (mRNA)	NM_001300974; NM_001304549; NM_014209	NM_007959
RefSeq (protein)	NP_001287903; NP_001291478; NP_055024	NP_031985
Location (UCSC)	Chr 19: 35.64 – 35.64 Mb	Chr 7: 30.33 – 30.34 Mb
PubMed search
- Wikidata
View/Edit Human	View/Edit Mouse

Ets variant 2 is a protein that in humans is encoded by the ETV2 gene. It is a transcription factor and also plays a role in vascular endothelial cell development.
