= ZNF146 =

Protein-coding gene in the species Homo sapiens

Identifiers
- Aliases: ZNF146, OZF, zinc finger protein 146
- External IDs: OMIM: 601505; MGI: 1347092; GeneCards: ZNF146

Gene location (Human)
Chr.	Chromosome 19 (human)
Band	19q13.12	Start	36,214,602 bp
Band	19q13.12	End	36,238,771 bp

Gene location (Mouse)
Chr.	Chromosome 7 (mouse)
Band	7|7 B1	Start	29,860,694 bp
Band	7|7 B1	End	29,869,175 bp
RNA expression pattern
Bgee	Human / Mouse (ortholog); Top expressed in: parietal pleura; epithelium of nasopharynx; amniotic fluid; lactiferous duct; germinal epithelium; visceral pleura; tibia; inferior ganglion of vagus nerve; subthalamic nucleus; pericardium / Top expressed in: ventricular zone; genital tubercle; tail of embryo; neural layer of retina; yolk sac; muscle of thigh; ganglionic eminence; dentate gyrus of hippocampal formation granule cell; superior frontal gyrus; otic placode; More reference expression data
BioGPS	n/a
Gene ontology
Molecular function	DNA-binding transcription factor activity; DNA binding; zinc ion binding; heparin binding; metal ion binding; nucleic acid binding; DNA-binding transcription factor activity, RNA polymerase II-specific
Cellular component	nucleolus; nucleus; cytosol
Biological process	regulation of transcription, DNA-templated; regulation of transcription by RNA polymerase II
Sources:Amigo / QuickGO
Orthologs
Databases	NCBI: entry; OMA: entry
Species	Human	Mouse
Entrez	7705	26465
Ensembl	ENSG00000167635	ENSMUSG00000037029
UniProt	Q15072	Q8BQN6
RefSeq (mRNA)	NM_001099638; NM_001099639; NM_007145	NM_011980; NM_001357557
RefSeq (protein)	NP_001093108; NP_001093109; NP_009076	NP_036110; NP_001344486
Location (UCSC)	Chr 19: 36.21 – 36.24 Mb	Chr 7: 29.86 – 29.87 Mb
PubMed search
- Wikidata
View/Edit Human	View/Edit Mouse

Zinc finger protein OZF is a protein that in humans is encoded by the ZNF146 gene.

== See also ==
- Zinc finger
