= Zinc finger protein 134 =

Protein found in humans

ZNF134

Identifiers
- Aliases: ZNF134, pHZ-15, zinc finger protein 134
- External IDs: OMIM: 604076; GeneCards: ZNF134

Gene location (Human)
Chr.	Chromosome 19 (human)
Band	19q13.43	Start	57,614,233 bp
Band	19q13.43	End	57,624,724 bp
RNA expression pattern
Bgee	Human / Mouse (ortholog); Top expressed in: gonad; secondary oocyte; testicle; ganglionic eminence; ventricular zone; epithelium of colon; Achilles tendon; islet of Langerhans; cerebellar cortex; cerebellar hemisphere / n/a; More reference expression data
BioGPS	n/a
Gene ontology
Molecular function	DNA-binding transcription factor activity; DNA binding; metal ion binding; nucleic acid binding; DNA-binding transcription factor activity, RNA polymerase II-specific; DNA-binding transcription activator activity, RNA polymerase II-specific
Cellular component	nucleus
Biological process	regulation of transcription, DNA-templated; transcription, DNA-templated; regulation of transcription by RNA polymerase II; positive regulation of transcription by RNA polymerase II
Sources:Amigo / QuickGO
Orthologs
Databases	NCBI: entry; OMA: entry
Species	Human	Mouse
Entrez	7693	n/a
Ensembl	ENSG00000213762	n/a
UniProt	P52741	n/a
RefSeq (mRNA)	NM_003435	n/a
RefSeq (protein)	NP_003426	n/a
Location (UCSC)	Chr 19: 57.61 – 57.62 Mb	n/a
PubMed search		n/a
- Wikidata
View/Edit Human

Zinc finger protein 134 is a protein that in humans is encoded by the ZNF134 gene.
