= Chromosome 3 =

Human chromosome

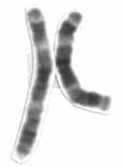
- Human chromosome 3 pair after G-banding. One is from mother, one is from father.

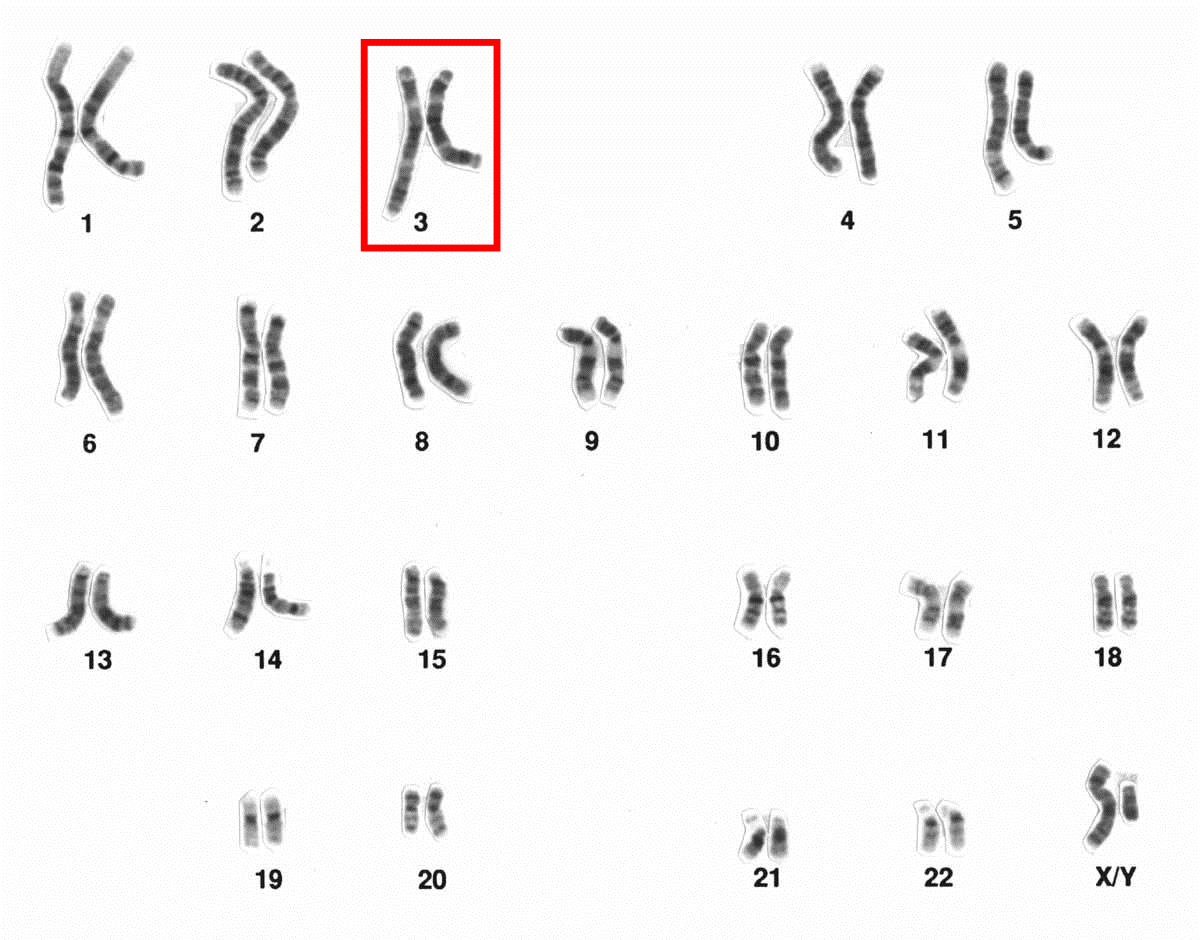
- Chromosome 3 pair in human male karyogram.

Features
- Length (bp): 201,105,948 bp (CHM13)
- No. of genes: 1,024 (CCDS)
- Type: Autosome
- Centromere position: Metacentric (90.9 Mbp)

Complete gene lists
- CCDS: Gene list
- HGNC: Gene list
- UniProt: Gene list
- NCBI: Gene list

External map viewers
- Ensembl: Chromosome 3
- Entrez: Chromosome 3
- NCBI: Chromosome 3
- UCSC: Chromosome 3

Full DNA sequences
- RefSeq: NC_000003 (FASTA)
- GenBank: CM000665 (FASTA)

Chromosome 3 is one of the 23 pairs of chromosomes in humans. People normally have two copies of this chromosome. Chromosome 3 spans more than 201 million base pairs (the building material of DNA) and represents about 6.5 percent of the total DNA in cells.

== Genes ==
=== Number of genes ===
The following are some of the gene count estimates of human chromosome 3. Because researchers use different approaches to genome annotation their predictions of the number of genes on each chromosome varies (for technical details, see gene prediction). Among various projects, the collaborative consensus coding sequence project (CCDS) takes an extremely conservative strategy. So CCDS's gene number prediction represents a lower bound on the total number of human protein-coding genes.

Estimated by	Protein-coding genes	Non-coding RNA genes	Pseudogenes	Source	Release date
CCDS	1,024	—	—		2016-09-08
HGNC	1,036	483	761		2017-05-12
Ensembl	1,073	1,158	761		2017-03-29
UniProt	1,081	—	—		2018-02-28
NCBI	1,085	1,108	902		2017-05-19

=== List of genes ===
The following is a partial list of genes on human chromosome 3. For complete list, see the link in the infobox on the right.

==== p-arm ====
Partial list of the genes located on p-arm (short arm) of human chromosome 3:

- ALAS1: aminolevulinate, delta-, synthase 1
- APEH: encoding enzyme Acylamino-acid-releasing enzyme
- ARPP-21: Cyclic AMP-regulated phosphoprotein, 21 kDa
- AZI2: encoding protein 5-azacytidine-induced protein 2
- BRK1: SCAR/WAVE actin nucleating complex subunit
- BRPF1: bromodomain and PHD finger containing 1
- BTD: biotinidase
- CEP15: predicted DNA binding protein.
- CFAP20DC: encoding protein Chromosome 3 open reading frame 67
- C3orf62: chromosome 3 open reading frame 62
- CACNA2D3: calcium channel, voltage-dependent, alpha 2/delta subunit 3
- CCR5: chemokine (C-C motif) receptor 5
- CGGBP1: CGG triplet repeat binding protein 1
- CMTM7: CKLF like MARVEL transmembrane domain containing 7
- CNTN4: Contactin 4
- COL7A1: Collagen, type VII, alpha 1 (epidermolysis bullosa, dystrophic, dominant and recessive)
- CRBN: Cereblon protein
- DCLK3: Doublecortin like kinase 3
- DLEC1: encoding protein Deleted in lung and esophageal cancer 1
- EAF1: ELL associated factor 1
- ENTPD3: ectonucleoside triphosphate diphosphohydrolase 3
- FAM107A: Family with sequence similarity 107 member A
- FAM19A1: Family with sequence similarity 19 member A1, C-C motif chemokine like
- FBXL2: F-box and leucine rich repeat protein 2
- FOXP1: Forkhead Box Protein P1
- FRA3A encoding protein Fragile site, aphidicolin type, common, fra(3)(p24.2)
- FRMD4B encoding protein FERM domain containing 4B
- GHRLOS: non-coding RNA ghrelin opposite strand (non-protein coding)
- GMPPB: GDP-mannose pyrophosphorylase B
- HACL1: encoding protein 2-hydroxyacyl-CoA lyase 1
- HEMK1: encoding protein HemK methyltransferase family member 1
- HIGD1A: HIG1 domain family member 1A
- HSN1B: Hereditary sensory neuropathy, type ib
- HTD2: encoding protein Hydroxyacyl-thioester dehydratase type 2
- LARS2: leucyl-tRNA synthetase, mitochondrial
- LIMD1: LIM domain-containing protein 1
- LOC105377021: encoding protein LOC105377021
- LINC00312: Long intergenic non-protein-coding RNA 312
- LZTFL1: Leucine zipper transcription factor like 1
- MIR138-1: encoding protein MicroRNA 138-1
- MIR425: MicroRNA 425
- MIR885: encoding protein MicroRNA 885
- MITF: microphthalmia-associated transcription factor
- MLH1: mutL homolog 1, colon cancer, nonpolyposis type 2 (E. coli)
- MYRIP: Myosin VIIA and Rab interacting protein
- NBEAL2: Neurobeachin-like 2
- NDUFAF3: encoding enzyme NADH dehydrogenase [ubiquinone] 1 alpha subcomplex assembly factor 3
- NKTR: NK-tumor recognition protein
- NPRL2: Nitrogen permease regulator 2-like protein
- OXTR: oxytocin receptor
- PCAF: acetyltransferase activity
- PHF7 encoding protein PHD finger protein 7
- PRICKLE2: encoding protein Prickle planar cell polarity protein 2
- PTHR1: parathyroid hormone receptor 1
- QRICH1: encoding protein QRICH1, also known as Glutamine-rich protein 1,
- RBM6: RNA-binding protein 6
- RPP14: Ribonuclease P protein subunit p14
- SCN5A: sodium channel, voltage-gated, type V, alpha (long QT syndrome 3)
- SETD5: SET domain containing 5
- SFMBT1: Scm-like with four mbt domains 1
- SLC25A20: solute carrier family 25 (carnitine/acylcarnitine translocase), member 20
- STT3B: catalytic subunit of the oligosaccharyltransferase complex
- SYNPR: synaptoporin
- TAFA4: encoding protein Family with sequence similarity 19 member A4, C-C motif chemokine like
- TCAIM: encoding protein T-cell activation inhibitor, mitochondrial
- TDGF1: Teratocarcinoma-derived growth factor 1
- TMEM158: Transmembrane protein 158
- TMIE: transmembrane inner ear
- TRAK1: trafficking kinesin-binding protein 1
- TRANK1: encoding protein Tetratricopeptide repeat and ankyrin repeat containing 1
- TTLL3: encoding protein Tubulin tyrosine ligase-like family, member 3
- TUSC2: tumor suppressor candidate 2
- UCN2: Urocortin-2
- ULK4: UNC-51 like kinase 4
- VGLL3: vestigial-like family member 3
- VHL: von Hippel-Lindau tumor suppressor
- ZMYND10: zinc finger MYND-type containing 10
- ZNF197: encoding protein Zinc finger protein 197
- ZNF502: encoding protein Zinc finger protein 502
- ZNF620: encoding protein Zinc finger protein 620
- ZNF621: encoding protein Zinc finger protein 621
- ZNF717: encoding protein Zinc finger protein 717

==== q-arm ====
Partial list of the genes located on q-arm (long arm) of human chromosome 3:

- ADIPOQ: adiponectin
- AMOTL2: encoding protein Angiomotin-like protein 2
- ARHGAP31: Rho GRPase activating protein 31
- BCHE: butyrylcholinesterase
- C3orf70 chromosome 3 open reading frame 70
- CAMPD1: Camptodactyly
- CCDC80: Coiled-coil domain containing protein 80
- CD200R1: Cell surface glycoprotein CD200 receptor 1
- CHST13: encoding protein Carbohydrate (chondroitin 4) sulfotransferase 13
- CLDND1: Claudin domain containing 1
- CPN2: Carboxypeptidase N subunit 2
- CPOX: coproporphyrinogen oxidase (coproporphyria, harderoporphyria)
- DPPA2: Developmental pluripotency associated 2
- DTX3L: encoding protein Deltex e3 ubiquitin ligase 3l
- DZIP3: encoding protein DAZ interacting zinc finger protein 3
- EAF2: ELL associated factor 2
- EFCC1: EF-hand and coiled-coil domain containing 1
- ETM1: Essential tremor 1
- ETV5: ETS variant 5
- FAM3D: family with sequence similarity 3, member D
- FAM43A: family with sequence similarity 43 member A
- FAM162A: family with sequence similarity 162 member A
- FBXO40: encoding protein F-box protein 40
- FILIP1L: encoding protein Filamin A interacting protein 1 like
- GYG1: Glycogenin-1
- HACD2 encoding protein 3-hydroxyacyl-CoA dehydratase 2
- HGD: homogentisate 1,2-dioxygenase (homogentisate oxidase)
- IFT122: intraflagellar transport gene 122
- KIAA1257: KIAA1257
- LINC01279: encoding protein long intergenic non-protein coding RNA 1279
- LNCR5: encoding protein lung cancer susceptibility 5
- LMLN: encoding protein Leishmanolysin-like (metallopeptidase M8 family)
- LRRC15: leucine rich repeat containing 15
- LSG1: large subunit GTPase 1 homolog
- MB21D2: encoding protein Mab-21 domain containing 2
- MCCC1: methylcrotonoyl-Coenzyme A carboxylase 1 (alpha)
- MORC1: encoding protein Morc family cw-type zinc finger 1
- MYLK: Telokin
- NEPRO: encoding protein Nucleolus and neural progenitor protein
- NFKBIZ: NF-kappa-B inhibitor zeta
- OTOL1: encoding glycoprotein Otolin
- PARP14 encoding protein Poly(ADP-ribose) polymerase family member 14
- PCCB: propionyl Coenzyme A carboxylase, beta polypeptide
- PDCD10: programmed cell death 10
- PIK3CA: phosphoinositide-3-kinase, catalytic, alpha polypeptide
- PISRT1: long non-coding RNA
- PROSER1: Proline and serine rich protein 1
- RAB7: RAB7, member RAS oncogene family
- RASA2: encoding protein Ras p21 protein activator 2
- RETNLB: resistin-like beta
- RHO: rhodopsin visual pigment
- RIOX2: Ribosomal oxygenase 2
- SELT: Selenoprotein T
- SENP7: Sentrin-specific protease 7
- SERP1: Stress-associated endoplasmic reticulum protein 1
- SOX2: transcription factor
- SOX2OT: SOX2 overlapping transcript
- SPG14 encoding protein Spastic paraplegia 14 (autosomal recessive)
- SRPRB: Signal recognition particle receptor subunit beta
- TEX55: encoding protein Testis expressed 55
- TIMMDC1: TIMMDC1
- TMEM44: encoding protein Transmembrane protein 44
- TM4SF1: Transmembrane 4 L6 family member 1
- TMPRSS7: encoding protein Transmembrane serine protease 7
- TP63: Tumor protein p63
- TRAT1: T-cell receptor-associated transmembrane adapter 1
- USH3A: Usher syndrome 3A
- ZBED2: encoding protein Zinc finger BED-type containing 2
- ZNF9: zinc finger protein 9 (a cellular retroviral nucleic acid binding protein)

== Diseases and disorders ==
The following diseases and disorders are some of those related to genes on chromosome 3:

- 3-Methylcrotonyl-CoA carboxylase deficiency
- 3q29 microdeletion syndrome
- Acute myeloid leukemia (AML)
- Alkaptonuria
- Arrhythmogenic right ventricular dysplasia
- Atransferrinemia
- Autism
- Autosomal dominant optic atrophy
- ADOA plus syndrome
- Biotinidase deficiency
- Blepharophimosis, epicanthus inversus and ptosis type 1
- Breast/colon/lung/pancreatic cancer
- Brugada syndrome
- Castillo fever
- Carnitine-acylcarnitine translocase deficiency
- Cataracts
- Cerebral cavernous malformation
- Charcot–Marie–Tooth disease, type 2
- Charcot–Marie–Tooth disease, type 1
- Chromosome 3q duplication syndrome
- Coproporphyria
- A location on human chromosome 3 is associated with respiratory failure and possibly with increased severity in COVID-19
- Dandy–Walker syndrome
- Deafness
- Diabetes
- Dystrophic epidermolysis bullosa
- Endplate acetylcholinesterase deficiency
- Essential tremors
- Ectrodactyly, Case 4
- Glaucoma, primary open angle
- Glycogen storage disease
- Hailey–Hailey disease
- Harderoporphyrinuria
- Heart block, progressive/nonprogressive
- Hereditary coproporphyria
- Hereditary nonpolyposis colorectal cancer
- HIV infection, susceptibility/resistance to
- Hypobetalipoproteinemia, familial
- Hypothermia
- Leukoencephalopathy with vanishing white matter
- Long QT syndrome
- Lymphomas
- Malignant hyperthermia susceptibility
- Metaphyseal chondrodysplasia, Murk Jansen type
- Microcoria
- Möbius syndrome
- Moyamoya disease
- Mucopolysaccharidosis
- Muir–Torre family cancer syndrome
- Myotonic dystrophy
- Neuropathy, hereditary motor and sensory, Okinawa type
- Night blindness
- Nonsyndromic deafness
- Ovarian cancer
- Porphyria
- Propionic acidemia
- Protein S deficiency
- Pseudocholinesterase deficiency
- Pseudo-Zellweger syndrome
- Retinitis pigmentosa
- Romano–Ward syndrome
- Seckel syndrome
- Sensenbrenner syndrome
- Septo-optic dysplasia
- Short stature
- Spinocerebellar ataxia
- Sucrose intolerance
- T-cell leukemia translocation altered gene
- Usher syndrome
- von Hippel–Lindau syndrome
- Waardenburg syndrome
- Xeroderma pigmentosum, complementation group c
- 3p14 microdeletion syndrome

== Cytogenetic band ==
G-banding ideograms of human chromosome 3

G-banding ideogram of human chromosome 3 in resolution 850 bphs. Band length in this diagram is proportional to base-pair length. This type of ideogram is generally used in genome browsers (e.g. Ensembl, UCSC Genome Browser).

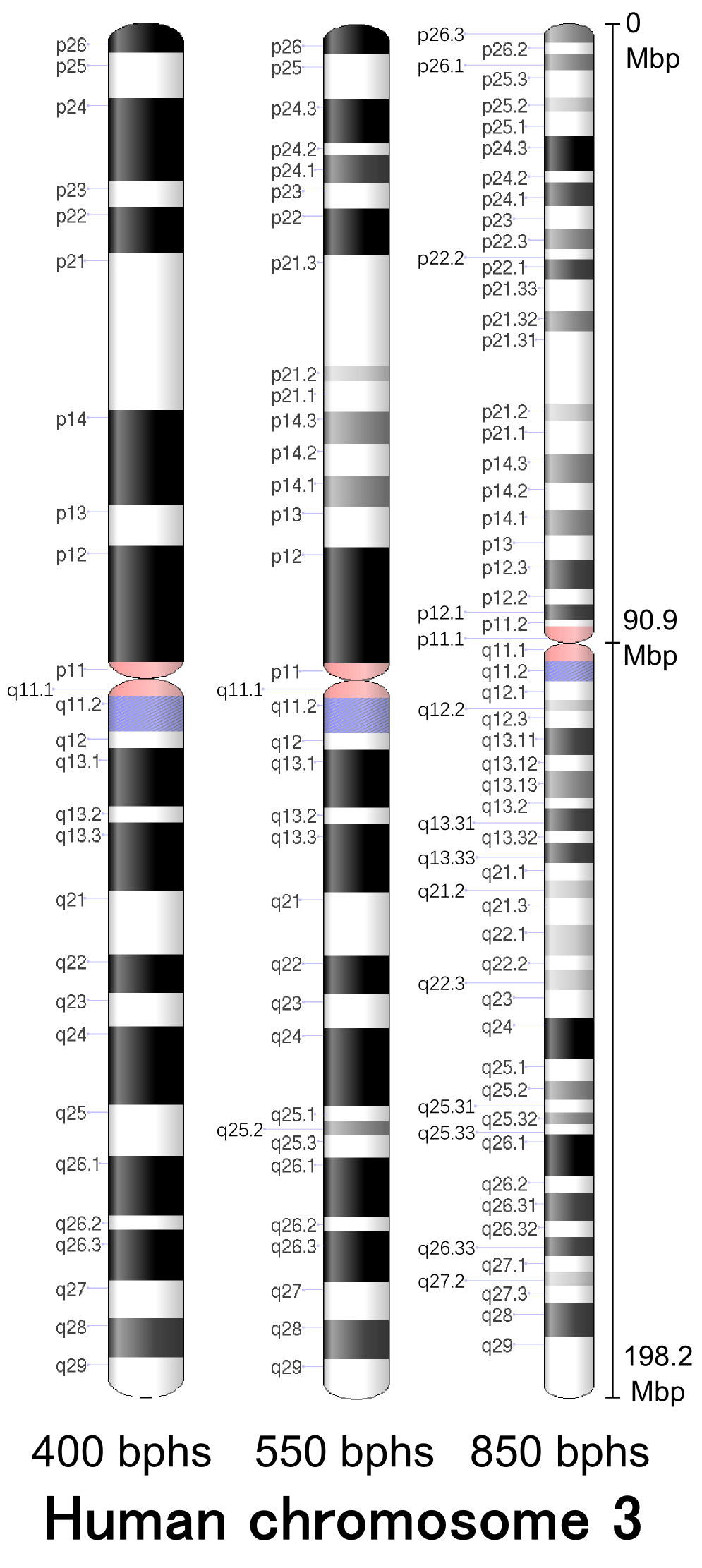
G-banding patterns of human chromosome 3 in three different resolutions (400, 550 and 850). Band length in this diagram is based on the ideograms from ISCN (2013). This type of ideogram represents actual relative band length observed under a microscope at the different moments during the mitotic process.

G-bands of human chromosome 3 in resolution 850 bphs
Chr.	Arm	Band	ISCN start	ISCN stop	Basepair start	Basepair stop	Stain	Density
3	p	26.3	0	175	1	2,800,000	gpos	50
3	p	26.2	175	263	2,800,001	4,000,000	gneg	
3	p	26.1	263	408	4,000,001	8,100,000	gpos	50
3	p	25.3	408	642	8,100,001	11,600,000	gneg	
3	p	25.2	642	759	11,600,001	13,200,000	gpos	25
3	p	25.1	759	963	13,200,001	16,300,000	gneg	
3	p	24.3	963	1269	16,300,001	23,800,000	gpos	100
3	p	24.2	1269	1357	23,800,001	26,300,000	gneg	
3	p	24.1	1357	1561	26,300,001	30,800,000	gpos	75
3	p	23	1561	1751	30,800,001	32,000,000	gneg	
3	p	22.3	1751	1926	32,000,001	36,400,000	gpos	50
3	p	22.2	1926	2013	36,400,001	39,300,000	gneg	
3	p	22.1	2013	2188	39,300,001	43,600,000	gpos	75
3	p	21.33	2188	2451	43,600,001	44,100,000	gneg	
3	p	21.32	2451	2626	44,100,001	44,200,000	gpos	50
3	p	21.31	2626	3239	44,200,001	50,600,000	gneg	
3	p	21.2	3239	3385	50,600,001	52,300,000	gpos	25
3	p	21.1	3385	3676	52,300,001	54,400,000	gneg	
3	p	14.3	3676	3910	54,400,001	58,600,000	gpos	50
3	p	14.2	3910	4143	58,600,001	63,800,000	gneg	
3	p	14.1	4143	4362	63,800,001	69,700,000	gpos	50
3	p	13	4362	4566	69,700,001	74,100,000	gneg	
3	p	12.3	4566	4814	74,100,001	79,800,000	gpos	75
3	p	12.2	4814	4946	79,800,001	83,500,000	gneg	
3	p	12.1	4946	5077	83,500,001	87,100,000	gpos	75
3	p	11.2	5077	5135	87,100,001	87,800,000	gneg	
3	p	11.1	5135	5266	87,800,001	90,900,000	acen	
3	q	11.1	5266	5427	90,900,001	94,000,000	acen	
3	q	11.2	5427	5602	94,000,001	98,600,000	gvar	
3	q	12.1	5602	5762	98,600,001	100,300,000	gneg	
3	q	12.2	5762	5850	100,300,001	101,200,000	gpos	25
3	q	12.3	5850	5996	101,200,001	103,100,000	gneg	
3	q	13.11	5996	6229	103,100,001	106,500,000	gpos	75
3	q	13.12	6229	6361	106,500,001	108,200,000	gneg	
3	q	13.13	6361	6594	108,200,001	111,600,000	gpos	50
3	q	13.2	6594	6682	111,600,001	113,700,000	gneg	
3	q	13.31	6682	6871	113,700,001	117,600,000	gpos	75
3	q	13.32	6871	6973	117,600,001	119,300,000	gneg	
3	q	13.33	6973	7148	119,300,001	122,200,000	gpos	75
3	q	21.1	7148	7294	122,200,001	124,100,000	gneg	
3	q	21.2	7294	7440	124,100,001	126,100,000	gpos	25
3	q	21.3	7440	7674	126,100,001	129,500,000	gneg	
3	q	22.1	7674	7936	129,500,001	134,000,000	gpos	25
3	q	22.2	7936	8053	134,000,001	136,000,000	gneg	
3	q	22.3	8053	8228	136,000,001	139,000,000	gpos	25
3	q	23	8228	8461	139,000,001	143,100,000	gneg	
3	q	24	8461	8811	143,100,001	149,200,000	gpos	100
3	q	25.1	8811	9001	149,200,001	152,300,000	gneg	
3	q	25.2	9001	9162	152,300,001	155,300,000	gpos	50
3	q	25.31	9162	9264	155,300,001	157,300,000	gneg	
3	q	25.32	9264	9366	157,300,001	159,300,000	gpos	50
3	q	25.33	9366	9453	159,300,001	161,000,000	gneg	
3	q	26.1	9453	9803	161,000,001	167,900,000	gpos	100
3	q	26.2	9803	9949	167,900,001	171,200,000	gneg	
3	q	26.31	9949	10183	171,200,001	176,000,000	gpos	75
3	q	26.32	10183	10329	176,000,001	179,300,000	gneg	
3	q	26.33	10329	10489	179,300,001	183,000,000	gpos	75
3	q	27.1	10489	10620	183,000,001	184,800,000	gneg	
3	q	27.2	10620	10737	184,800,001	186,300,000	gpos	25
3	q	27.3	10737	10883	186,300,001	188,200,000	gneg	
3	q	28	10883	11175	188,200,001	192,600,000	gpos	75
3	q	29	11175	11700	192,600,001	198,295,559	gneg	

== See also ==
- Coiled-coil domain-containing 37 (FLJ40083)
- RTP3 (gene)
