= MicroRNA 138-1 =

MIR138-1

Identifiers
- Aliases: MIR138-1, MIRN138-1, mir-138-1, microRNA 138-1
- External IDs: OMIM: 613394; GeneCards: MIR138-1; OMA:MIR138-1 - orthologs

Gene location (Human)
Chr.	Chromosome 3 (human)
Band	3p21.32	Start	44,114,212 bp
Band	3p21.32	End	44,114,310 bp
RNA expression pattern
Bgee	Human / Mouse (ortholog); Top expressed in: gastrocnemius muscle; blood; upper lobe of left lung; intestine; monocyte; corpus callosum; left adrenal gland; left lobe of thyroid gland; amygdala; human kidney / n/a; More reference expression data
BioGPS	n/a
Orthologs
Species	Human	Mouse
Entrez	406929	n/a
Ensembl	ENSG00000207954	n/a
UniProt	n a	n/a
RefSeq (mRNA)	n/a	n/a
RefSeq (protein)	n/a	n/a
Location (UCSC)	Chr 3: 44.11 – 44.11 Mb	n/a
PubMed search		n/a
- Wikidata
View/Edit Human

MicroRNA 138-1 is a protein that in humans is encoded by the MIR138-1 gene.

== Function ==
microRNAs (miRNAs) are short (20-24 nt) non-coding RNAs that are involved in post-transcriptional regulation of gene expression in multicellular organisms by affecting both the stability and translation of mRNAs. miRNAs are transcribed by RNA polymerase II as part of capped and polyadenylated primary transcripts (pri-miRNAs) that can be either protein-coding or non-coding. The primary transcript is cleaved by the Drosha ribonuclease III enzyme to produce an approximately 70-nt stem-loop precursor miRNA (pre-miRNA), which is further cleaved by the cytoplasmic Dicer ribonuclease to generate the mature miRNA and antisense miRNA star (miRNA*) products. The mature miRNA is incorporated into a RNA-induced silencing complex (RISC), which recognizes target mRNAs through imperfect base pairing with the miRNA and most commonly results in translational inhibition or destabilization of the target mRNA. The RefSeq represents the predicted microRNA stem-loop.
