= ARPP-21 =

Protein-coding gene in the species Homo sapiens

ARPP21

Identifiers
- Aliases: ARPP21, ARPP-21, R3HDM3, RCS, TARPP, cAMP regulated phosphoprotein 21kDa, cAMP regulated phosphoprotein 21
- External IDs: OMIM: 605488; MGI: 107562; HomoloGene: 32306; GeneCards: ARPP21; OMA:ARPP21 - orthologs

Gene location (Human)
Chr.	Chromosome 3 (human)
Band	3p22.3	Start	35,638,945 bp
Band	3p22.3	End	35,794,496 bp

Gene location (Mouse)
Chr.	Chromosome 9 (mouse)
Band	9 F3|9 62.46 cM	Start	112,065,091 bp
Band	9 F3|9 62.46 cM	End	112,235,938 bp
RNA expression pattern
Bgee	Human / Mouse (ortholog); Top expressed in: external globus pallidus; putamen; nucleus accumbens; caudate nucleus; middle temporal gyrus; cerebellar hemisphere; right hemisphere of cerebellum; primary visual cortex; Brodmann area 23; right frontal lobe / Top expressed in: olfactory tubercle; globus pallidus; piriform cortex; nucleus accumbens; superior frontal gyrus; temporal lobe; cingulate gyrus; visual cortex; primary motor cortex; amygdala; More reference expression data
BioGPS	n/a
Gene ontology
Molecular function	calmodulin binding; nucleic acid binding; molecular function
Cellular component	cytoplasm; cellular component
Biological process	cellular response to heat; biological process
Sources:Amigo / QuickGO
Orthologs
Species	Human	Mouse
Entrez	10777	74100
Ensembl	ENSG00000172995	ENSMUSG00000032503
UniProt	Q9UBL0	Q9DCB4
RefSeq (mRNA)	NM_001025068; NM_001025069; NM_001267616; NM_001267617; NM_001267618 NM_001267619; NM_016300; NM_198399	NM_001177615; NM_001177616; NM_001177617; NM_001177618; NM_001177619 NM_001177620; NM_001177623; NM_028755; NM_033264
RefSeq (protein)	NP_001020239; NP_001020240; NP_001254545; NP_001254546; NP_001254547 NP_001254548; NP_057384; NP_938409	NP_001171086; NP_001171087; NP_001171088; NP_001171089; NP_001171090 NP_001171091; NP_001171094; NP_083031; NP_150289; NP_001348929; NP_001348930; NP_001348931; NP_001348932; NP_001348933; NP_001348934; NP_001348935; NP_001348936; NP_001348937; NP_001348938; NP_001348939; NP_001348940; NP_001348941; NP_001348942; NP_001348943; NP_001348944; NP_001348945; NP_001348946; NP_001348947; NP_001348948; NP_001348949; NP_001348950; NP_001348951; NP_001348952; NP_001348953; NP_001348954; NP_001348955; NP_001348956; NP_001348957; NP_001348958; NP_001348959; NP_001348960; NP_001348961; NP_001348962; NP_001348963; NP_001348964; NP_001348965; NP_001348966; NP_001348967; NP_001348968; NP_001348969; NP_001348970
Location (UCSC)	Chr 3: 35.64 – 35.79 Mb	Chr 9: 112.07 – 112.24 Mb
PubMed search
- Wikidata
View/Edit Human	View/Edit Mouse

Cyclic AMP-regulated phosphoprotein, 21 kDa, also known as ARPP21, is a human gene. Research published in March 2026 identified ARPP21 as one of the genes contributing to overall risk of developing amyotrophic lateral sclerosis (ALS). A new high-impact ARPP21 variant was identified (p.P747L). Furthermore, the p.P563L mutation, previously established as the cause of ALS in seven unrelated families from Spain, was confirmed to be associated with a more aggressive disease course.
