= SYNPR =

Protein-coding gene in the species Homo sapiens

Identifiers
- Aliases: SYNPR, SPO, synaptoporin
- External IDs: MGI: 1919253; GeneCards: SYNPR

Gene location (Human)
Chr.	Chromosome 3 (human)
Band	3p14.2	Start	63,228,315 bp
Band	3p14.2	End	63,616,924 bp

Gene location (Mouse)
Chr.	Chromosome 14 (mouse)
Band	14|14 A1	Start	8,853,423 bp
Band	14|14 A1	End	9,184,983 bp
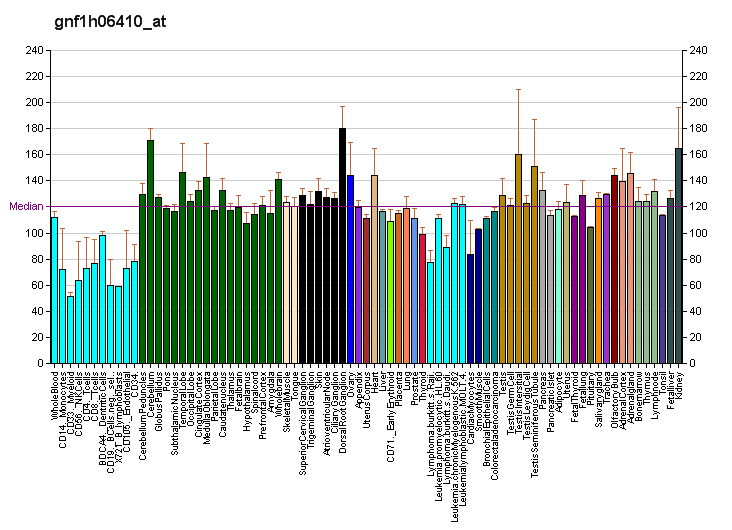

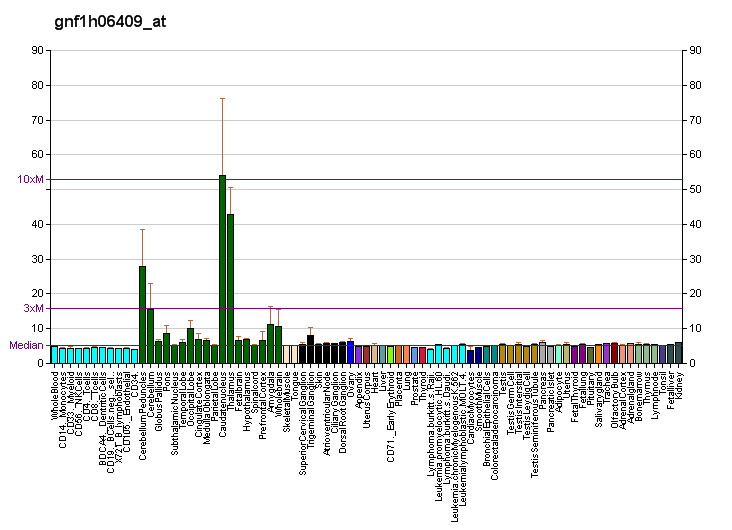
RNA expression pattern
Bgee	Human / Mouse (ortholog); Top expressed in: lateral nuclear group of thalamus; cerebellar vermis; nucleus accumbens; external globus pallidus; Brodmann area 46; middle temporal gyrus; caudate nucleus; cerebellar hemisphere; superior frontal gyrus; Brodmann area 23 / Top expressed in: habenula; olfactory tubercle; dorsomedial hypothalamic nucleus; dentate gyrus; nucleus accumbens; globus pallidus; dentate gyrus of hippocampal formation granule cell; suprachiasmatic nucleus; lobe of cerebellum; neural layer of retina; More reference expression data
BioGPS	More reference expression data
Gene ontology
Molecular function	protein binding; syntaxin-1 binding
Cellular component	synapse; membrane; cell junction; cytoplasmic vesicle; integral component of synaptic vesicle membrane; synaptic vesicle membrane; neuron projection; integral component of membrane; synaptic vesicle
Biological process	transport
Sources:Amigo / QuickGO
Orthologs
Databases	NCBI: entry; OMA: entry
Species	Human	Mouse
Entrez	132204	72003
Ensembl	ENSG00000163630	ENSMUSG00000056296
UniProt	Q8TBG9	Q8BGN8
RefSeq (mRNA)	NM_001130003; NM_144642	NM_001163032; NM_028052
RefSeq (protein)	NP_001123475; NP_653243	NP_001156504; NP_082328
Location (UCSC)	Chr 3: 63.23 – 63.62 Mb	Chr 14: 8.85 – 9.18 Mb
PubMed search
- Wikidata
View/Edit Human	View/Edit Mouse

Synaptoporin is a protein that in humans is encoded by the SYNPR gene. It is expressed in the brain in small synaptic vesicles and predicted to modulate chemical synaptic transmission.
