= Filamin A interacting protein 1 like =

Protein-coding gene in the species Homo sapiens

FILIP1L

Identifiers
- Aliases: FILIP1L, DOC-1, DOC1, GIP130, GIP90, filamin A interacting protein 1-like, filamin A interacting protein 1 like
- External IDs: OMIM: 612993; MGI: 1925999; HomoloGene: 37121; GeneCards: FILIP1L; OMA:FILIP1L - orthologs

Gene location (Human)
Chr.	Chromosome 3 (human)
Band	3q12.1	Start	99,828,811 bp
Band	3q12.1	End	100,114,513 bp

Gene location (Mouse)
Chr.	Chromosome 16 (mouse)
Band	16|16 C1.1	Start	57,173,456 bp
Band	16|16 C1.1	End	57,393,489 bp
RNA expression pattern
Bgee	Human / Mouse (ortholog); Top expressed in: saphenous vein; tail of epididymis; vena cava; urethra; Descending thoracic aorta; superficial temporal artery; ascending aorta; right coronary artery; popliteal artery; tibial arteries / Top expressed in: ascending aorta; genital tubercle; external carotid artery; hand; carotid body; aortic valve; umbilical cord; lymph node; spleen; internal carotid artery; More reference expression data
BioGPS	n/a
Gene ontology
Molecular function	molecular function
Cellular component	cytoplasm; membrane; nucleus
Biological process	biological process
Sources:Amigo / QuickGO
Orthologs
Species	Human	Mouse
Entrez	11259	78749
Ensembl	ENSG00000168386	ENSMUSG00000043336
UniProt	Q4L180	Q6P6L0
RefSeq (mRNA)	NM_001042459; NM_001282793; NM_001282794; NM_014890; NM_182909 NM_001370247; NM_001387850; NM_001387851; NM_001387852	NM_001040397; NM_001177871
RefSeq (protein)	NP_001035924; NP_001269722; NP_001269723; NP_055705; NP_878913 NP_001357176	NP_001035487; NP_001171342
Location (UCSC)	Chr 3: 99.83 – 100.11 Mb	Chr 16: 57.17 – 57.39 Mb
PubMed search
- Wikidata
View/Edit Human	View/Edit Mouse

Filamin A interacting protein 1 like is a protein that in humans is encoded by the FILIP1L gene.
