= Zinc finger protein 502 =

Protein found in humans

ZNF502

Identifiers
- Aliases: ZNF502, zinc finger protein 502
- External IDs: MGI: 3033356; GeneCards: ZNF502

Gene location (Human)
Chr.	Chromosome 3 (human)
Band	3p21.31	Start	44,712,643 bp
Band	3p21.31	End	44,723,831 bp

Gene location (Mouse)
Chr.	Chromosome 13 (mouse)
Band	13|13 C1	Start	74,517,445 bp
Band	13|13 C1	End	74,538,955 bp
RNA expression pattern
Bgee	Human / Mouse (ortholog); Top expressed in: testicle; gonad; Achilles tendon; ventricular zone; ganglionic eminence; islet of Langerhans; endometrium; ovary; right ovary; left ovary / Top expressed in: spermatid; epiblast; embryo; embryo; right kidney; genital tubercle; mesencephalon; proximal tubule; uterus; limb; More reference expression data
BioGPS	n/a
Gene ontology
Molecular function	DNA binding; protein binding; metal ion binding; nucleic acid binding; DNA-binding transcription factor activity, RNA polymerase II-specific
Cellular component	nucleus
Biological process	positive regulation by host of viral process; transcription, DNA-templated; regulation of transcription, DNA-templated; regulation of transcription by RNA polymerase II
Sources:Amigo / QuickGO
Orthologs
Databases	NCBI: entry; OMA: entry
Species	Human	Mouse
Entrez	91392	238722
Ensembl	ENSG00000281448; ENSG00000196653	ENSMUSG00000069184
UniProt	Q8TBZ5	Q0VFY0
RefSeq (mRNA)	NM_001134440; NM_001134441; NM_001134442; NM_001282880; NM_033210	NM_001081680; NM_001374038
RefSeq (protein)	NP_001127912; NP_001127913; NP_001127914; NP_001269809; NP_149987	NP_001075149; NP_001360967
Location (UCSC)	Chr 3: 44.71 – 44.72 Mb	Chr 13: 74.52 – 74.54 Mb
PubMed search
- Wikidata
View/Edit Human	View/Edit Mouse

Zinc finger protein 502 is a protein that in humans is encoded by the ZNF502 gene.
