= ETM1 =

DRD3
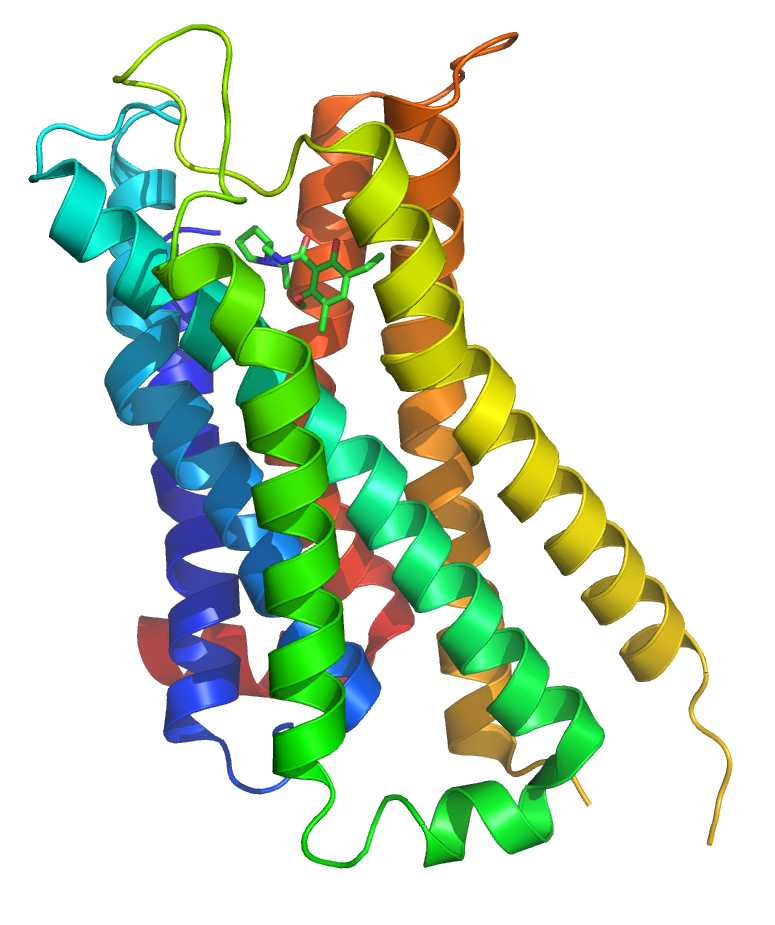
Available structures
PDB	Ortholog search: PDBe RCSB
PDB	List of PDB id codes 3PBL

Identifiers
- Aliases: DRD3, D3DR, ETM1, FET1, dopamine receptor D3
- External IDs: OMIM: 126451; MGI: 94925; HomoloGene: 623; GeneCards: DRD3; OMA:DRD3 - orthologs

Gene location (Human)
Chr.	Chromosome 3 (human)
Band	3q13.31	Start	114,127,580 bp
Band	3q13.31	End	114,199,407 bp

Gene location (Mouse)
Chr.	Chromosome 16 (mouse)
Band	16 B4|16 28.44 cM	Start	43,574,389 bp
Band	16 B4|16 28.44 cM	End	43,643,295 bp
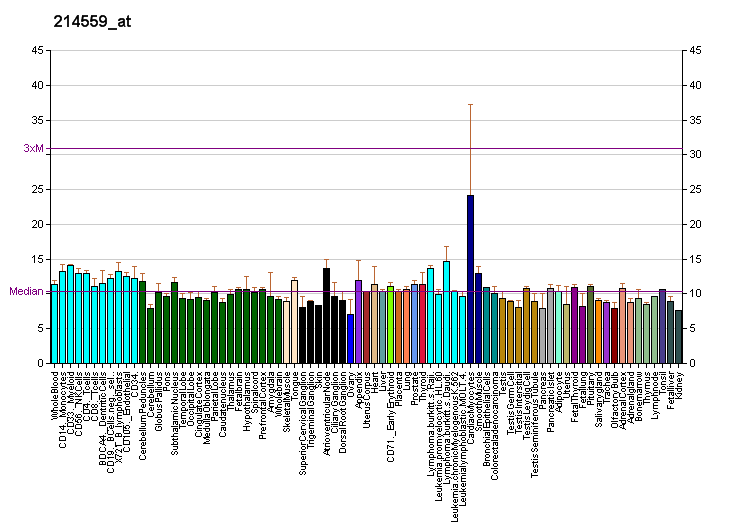

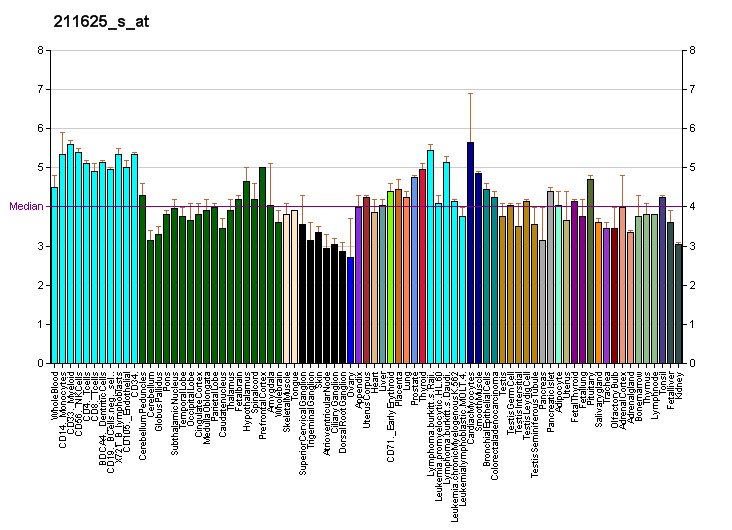
RNA expression pattern
Bgee	Human / Mouse (ortholog); Top expressed in: testicle; nucleus accumbens; putamen; caudate nucleus; granulocyte; prefrontal cortex; lymph node; Hypothalamus; left testis; right testis / Top expressed in: morula; zygote; superior frontal gyrus; right ventricle; lumbar subsegment of spinal cord; ventricular zone; meninges; dentate gyrus of hippocampal formation granule cell; blastocyst; tibiofemoral joint; More reference expression data
BioGPS	More reference expression data
Gene ontology
Molecular function	protein binding; signal transducer activity; G protein-coupled receptor activity; dopamine neurotransmitter receptor activity; dopamine neurotransmitter receptor activity, coupled via Gi/Go; dopamine binding; protein domain specific binding; D1 dopamine receptor binding; adrenergic receptor activity
Cellular component	endocytic vesicle; apical part of cell; cell projection; integral component of membrane; membrane; plasma membrane; integral component of plasma membrane; dopaminergic synapse; glutamatergic synapse; GABA-ergic synapse; integral component of postsynaptic density membrane
Biological process	negative regulation of sodium:proton antiporter activity; dopamine receptor signaling pathway; dopamine metabolic process; regulation of circadian sleep/wake cycle, sleep; negative regulation of dopamine receptor signaling pathway; positive regulation of cell population proliferation; regulation of dopamine uptake involved in synaptic transmission; response to histamine; response to ethanol; prepulse inhibition; social behavior; learning; positive regulation of renal sodium excretion; arachidonic acid secretion; negative regulation of protein secretion; negative regulation of transcription by RNA polymerase II; gastric emptying; regulation of blood volume by renin-angiotensin; regulation of locomotion involved in locomotory behavior; cellular calcium ion homeostasis; regulation of locomotion; learning or memory; response to amphetamine; positive regulation of transcription by RNA polymerase II; positive regulation of cytokinesis; signal transduction; regulation of lipid metabolic process; regulation of multicellular organism growth; visual learning; G protein-coupled receptor internalization; regulation of dopamine secretion; negative regulation of protein kinase B signaling; adenylate cyclase-activating dopamine receptor signaling pathway; locomotory behavior; behavioral response to cocaine; negative regulation of blood pressure; acid secretion; musculoskeletal movement, spinal reflex action; positive regulation of dopamine receptor signaling pathway; circadian regulation of gene expression; response to morphine; negative regulation of oligodendrocyte differentiation; adenylate cyclase-inhibiting dopamine receptor signaling pathway; positive regulation of mitotic nuclear division; response to cocaine; synaptic transmission, dopaminergic; G protein-coupled receptor signaling pathway; autophagy; negative regulation of apoptotic process; regulation of neurotransmitter uptake; regulation of postsynaptic neurotransmitter receptor internalization; adenylate cyclase-modulating G protein-coupled receptor signaling pathway; adenylate cyclase-activating adrenergic receptor signaling pathway
Sources:Amigo / QuickGO
Orthologs
Species	Human	Mouse
Entrez	1814	13490
Ensembl	ENSG00000151577	ENSMUSG00000022705
UniProt	P35462	P30728
RefSeq (mRNA)	NM_000796; NM_001282563; NM_001290809; NM_033658; NM_033659 NM_033660; NM_033663	NM_007877
RefSeq (protein)	NP_000787; NP_001269492; NP_001277738; NP_387512	NP_031903
Location (UCSC)	Chr 3: 114.13 – 114.2 Mb	Chr 16: 43.57 – 43.64 Mb
PubMed search
- Wikidata
View/Edit Human	View/Edit Mouse

essential tremor 1

Identifiers
- Symbol: ETM1
- HGNC: 3486
- OMIM: 190300

Other data
- Locus: Chr. 3 q13

ETM1 is a gene associated with essential tremor.
