= CPN2 =

Protein-coding gene in humans

Identifiers
- Aliases: CPN2, ACBP, carboxypeptidase N subunit 2
- External IDs: OMIM: 603104; MGI: 1919006; GeneCards: CPN2

Gene location (Human)
Chr.	Chromosome 3 (human)
Band	3q29	Start	194,339,768 bp
Band	3q29	End	194,351,328 bp

Gene location (Mouse)
Chr.	Chromosome 16 (mouse)
Band	16|16 B2	Start	30,075,196 bp
Band	16|16 B2	End	30,086,317 bp
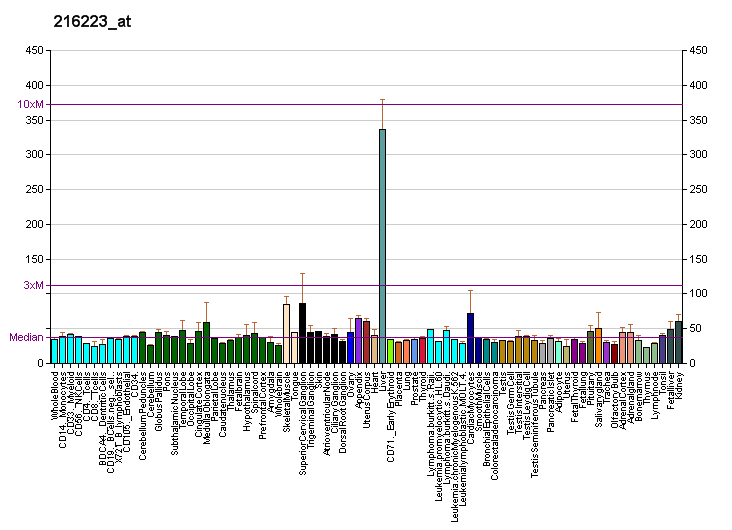
RNA expression pattern
Bgee	Human / Mouse (ortholog); Top expressed in: right lobe of liver; human kidney; testicle; kidney tubule; right adrenal gland; right adrenal cortex; glomerulus; metanephric glomerulus; left adrenal gland; left adrenal cortex / Top expressed in: left lobe of liver; brown adipose tissue; sexually immature organism; yolk sac; aorta; duodenum; ascending aorta; jejunum; precursor cell; human fetus; More reference expression data
BioGPS	More reference expression data
Gene ontology
Molecular function	enzyme regulator activity; metallocarboxypeptidase activity
Cellular component	blood microparticle; extracellular exosome; extracellular region; extracellular space; extracellular matrix
Biological process	protein stabilization; regulation of catalytic activity; proteolysis; regulation of complement activation
Sources:Amigo / QuickGO
Orthologs
Databases	NCBI: entry; OMA: entry
Species	Human	Mouse
Entrez	1370	71756
Ensembl	ENSG00000178772	ENSMUSG00000023176
UniProt	P22792	Q9DBB9
RefSeq (mRNA)	NM_001080513; NM_001291988; NM_001309	NM_027904
RefSeq (protein)	NP_001073982; NP_001278917	NP_082180
Location (UCSC)	Chr 3: 194.34 – 194.35 Mb	Chr 16: 30.08 – 30.09 Mb
PubMed search
- Wikidata
View/Edit Human	View/Edit Mouse

Carboxypeptidase N subunit 2 is an enzyme that in humans is encoded by the CPN2 gene.
