= CCDC80 =

Protein-coding gene in humans

Identifiers
- Aliases: CCDC80, DRO1, SSG1, URB, okuribin, coiled-coil domain containing 80, CL2, LINC01279
- External IDs: OMIM: 608298; MGI: 1915146; HomoloGene: 12206; GeneCards: CCDC80; OMA:CCDC80 - orthologs

Gene location (Human)
Chr.	Chromosome 3 (human)
Band	3q13.2	Start	112,596,797 bp
Band	3q13.2	End	112,649,530 bp

Gene location (Mouse)
Chr.	Chromosome 16 (mouse)
Band	16|16 B5	Start	44,913,765 bp
Band	16|16 B5	End	44,948,440 bp
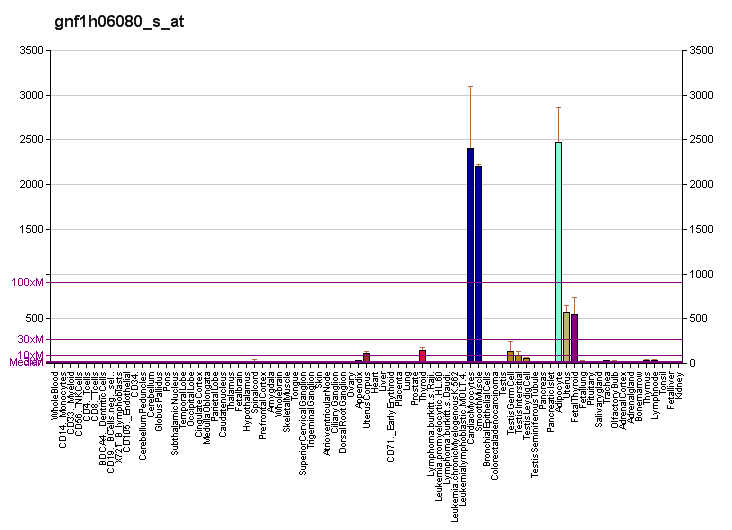

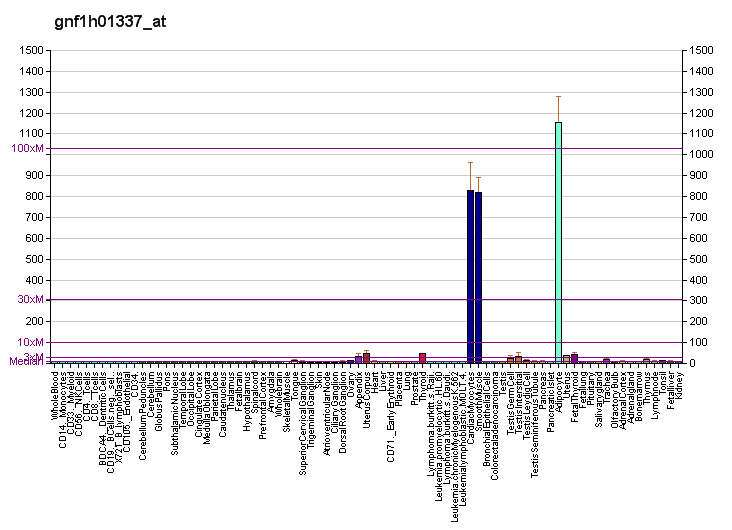
RNA expression pattern
Bgee	Human / Mouse (ortholog); Top expressed in: parietal pleura; tendon of biceps brachii; smooth muscle tissue; skin of arm; gallbladder; skin of hip; vena cava; saphenous vein; stromal cell of endometrium; tibia / Top expressed in: calvaria; stroma of bone marrow; white adipose tissue; ankle; skin of external ear; body of femur; semi-lunar valve; efferent ductule; aortic valve; umbilical cord; More reference expression data
BioGPS	More reference expression data
Gene ontology
Molecular function	fibronectin binding; glycosaminoglycan binding; heparin binding
Cellular component	extracellular region; basement membrane; interstitial matrix; extracellular matrix
Biological process	extracellular matrix organization; positive regulation of cell-substrate adhesion; response to bacterium
Sources:Amigo / QuickGO
Orthologs
Species	Human	Mouse
Entrez	151887	67896
Ensembl	ENSG00000091986	ENSMUSG00000022665
UniProt	Q76M96	Q8R2G6
RefSeq (mRNA)	NM_199512; NM_199511; NM_178274	NM_026439
RefSeq (protein)	NP_955805; NP_955806	NP_080715
Location (UCSC)	Chr 3: 112.6 – 112.65 Mb	Chr 16: 44.91 – 44.95 Mb
PubMed search
- Wikidata
View/Edit Human	View/Edit Mouse

Coiled-coil domain-containing protein 80 is a protein that in humans is encoded by the CCDC80 gene. Bioinformatics analysis suggests the CCDC80 protein is a peroxiredoxin.
