= ZMYND10 =

Protein-coding gene in the species Homo sapiens

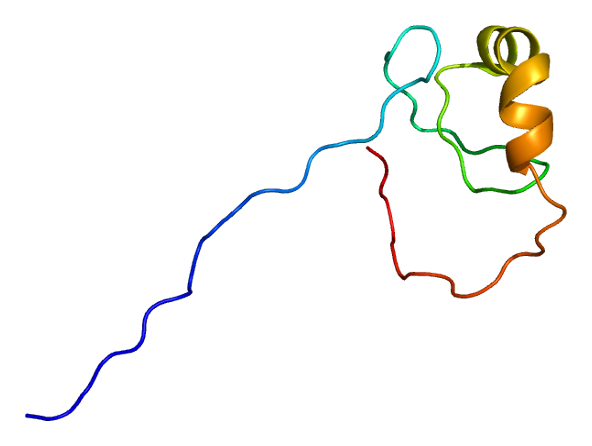

Identifiers
- Aliases: ZMYND10, BLU, CILD22, FLU, zinc finger MYND-type containing 10, DNAAF7
- External IDs: OMIM: 607070; MGI: 2387863; GeneCards: ZMYND10
Available structures
PDB	Ortholog search: PDBe RCSB
PDB	List of PDB id codes 2D8Q, 2DAN

Gene location (Human)
Chr.	Chromosome 3 (human)
Band	3p21.31	Start	50,341,110 bp
Band	3p21.31	End	50,345,732 bp

Gene location (Mouse)
Chr.	Chromosome 9 (mouse)
Band	9|9 F1	Start	107,424,497 bp
Band	9|9 F1	End	107,428,518 bp
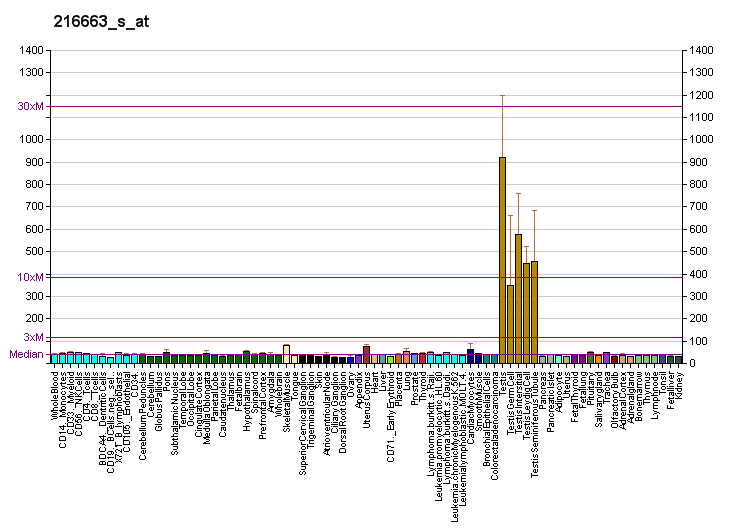

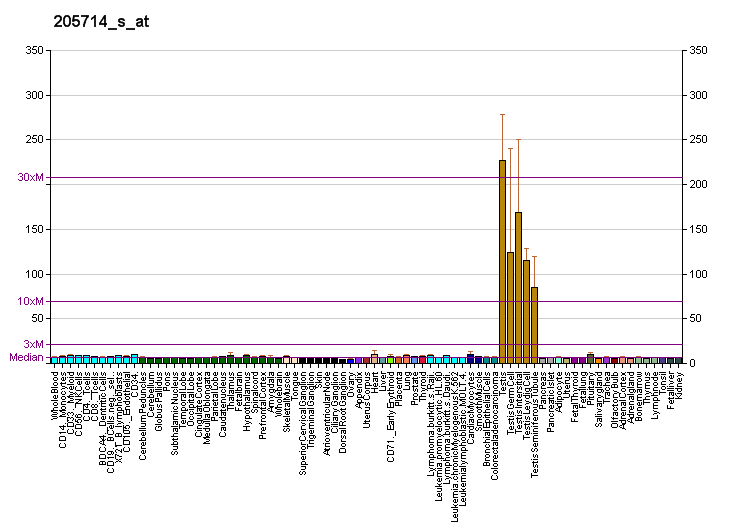
RNA expression pattern
Bgee	Human / Mouse (ortholog); Top expressed in: right uterine tube; left testis; right testis; bronchial epithelial cell; olfactory zone of nasal mucosa; testicle; mucosa of paranasal sinus; right lung; gonad; nasal epithelium / Top expressed in: spermatocyte; seminiferous tubule; morula; spermatid; right kidney; proximal tubule; human kidney; olfactory epithelium; Epithelium of choroid plexus; secondary oocyte; More reference expression data
BioGPS	More reference expression data
Gene ontology
Molecular function	protein binding; metal ion binding
Cellular component	cytoplasm; centriolar satellite; cytoskeleton; microtubule organizing center; apical plasma membrane; plasma membrane; membrane
Biological process	outer dynein arm assembly; motile cilium assembly; inner dynein arm assembly; positive regulation of motile cilium assembly
Sources:Amigo / QuickGO
Orthologs
Databases	NCBI: entry; OMA: entry
Species	Human	Mouse
Entrez	51364	114602
Ensembl	ENSG00000004838	ENSMUSG00000010044
UniProt	O75800	Q99ML0
RefSeq (mRNA)	NM_001308379; NM_015896	NM_053253; NM_001379079; NM_001379080
RefSeq (protein)	NP_001295308; NP_056980	NP_444483; NP_001366008; NP_001366009; NP_001391876
Location (UCSC)	Chr 3: 50.34 – 50.35 Mb	Chr 9: 107.42 – 107.43 Mb
PubMed search
- Wikidata
View/Edit Human	View/Edit Mouse

Zinc finger MYND domain-containing protein 10 is a protein that in humans is encoded by the ZMYND10 gene.
