= Developmental pluripotency associated 2 =

Protein-coding gene in the species Homo sapiens

DPPA2

Identifiers
- Aliases: DPPA2, CT100, ECAT15-2, PESCRG1, Developmental pluripotency associated 2
- External IDs: OMIM: 614445; MGI: 2157523; GeneCards: DPPA2

Gene location (Human)
Chr.	Chromosome 3 (human)
Band	3q13.13	Start	109,293,788 bp
Band	3q13.13	End	109,316,517 bp

Gene location (Mouse)
Chr.	Chromosome 16 (mouse)
Band	16|16 B5	Start	48,124,271 bp
Band	16|16 B5	End	48,140,086 bp
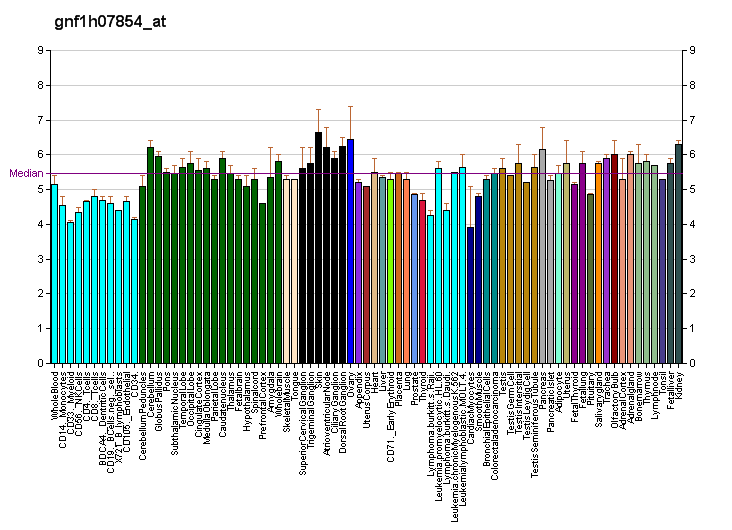
RNA expression pattern
Bgee	Human / Mouse (ortholog); Top expressed in: gonad; testicle; right testis; left testis; placenta; kidney; metanephros; human kidney; ovary / Top expressed in: morula; morula; blastocyst; zygote; secondary oocyte; primary oocyte; primordial germ cell; ooblast; embryo; embryo; More reference expression data
BioGPS	More reference expression data
Gene ontology
Molecular function	protein binding; chromatin binding
Cellular component	nucleus
Biological process	transcription, DNA-templated; regulation of transcription, DNA-templated
Sources:Amigo / QuickGO
Orthologs
Databases	NCBI: entry; OMA: entry
Species	Human	Mouse
Entrez	151871	73703
Ensembl	ENSG00000163530	ENSMUSG00000072419
UniProt	Q7Z7J5	Q9CWH0
RefSeq (mRNA)	NM_138815	NM_028615
RefSeq (protein)	NP_620170	NP_082891
Location (UCSC)	Chr 3: 109.29 – 109.32 Mb	Chr 16: 48.12 – 48.14 Mb
PubMed search
- Wikidata
View/Edit Human	View/Edit Mouse

Developmental pluripotency-associated protein 2 is a protein that in humans is encoded by the DPPA2 gene.
