= FAM3D =

Protein-coding gene in the species Homo sapiens

Identifiers
- Aliases: FAM3D, EF7, OIT1, family with sequence similarity 3 member D, FAM3 metabolism regulating signaling molecule D
- External IDs: OMIM: 608619; MGI: 1201784; GeneCards: FAM3D

Gene location (Human)
Chr.	Chromosome 3 (human)
Band	3p14.2	Start	58,633,946 bp
Band	3p14.2	End	58,666,834 bp

Gene location (Mouse)
Chr.	Chromosome 14 (mouse)
Band	14|14 A1	Start	14,091,019 bp
Band	14|14 A1	End	14,120,836 bp
RNA expression pattern
Bgee	Human / Mouse (ortholog); Top expressed in: mucosa of transverse colon; rectum; mucosa of sigmoid colon; nasal epithelium; mucosa of ileum; olfactory zone of nasal mucosa; parotid gland; trachea; mucosa of pharynx; minor salivary glands / Top expressed in: left colon; gastric mucosa; epithelium of stomach; mucous cell of stomach; parotid gland; duodenum; submandibular gland; crypt of lieberkuhn of small intestine; pyloric antrum; Ileal epithelium; More reference expression data
BioGPS	n/a
Gene ontology
Molecular function	cytokine activity
Cellular component	extracellular region; membrane; integral component of membrane
Biological process	negative regulation of insulin secretion; regulation of signaling receptor activity; negative regulation of glucagon secretion; signal transduction
Sources:Amigo / QuickGO
Orthologs
Databases	NCBI: entry; OMA: entry
Species	Human	Mouse
Entrez	131177	18300
Ensembl	ENSG00000198643	ENSMUSG00000021749
UniProt	Q96BQ1	P97805
RefSeq (mRNA)	NM_138805	NM_146050
RefSeq (protein)	NP_620160	NP_666162
Location (UCSC)	Chr 3: 58.63 – 58.67 Mb	Chr 14: 14.09 – 14.12 Mb
PubMed search
- Wikidata
View/Edit Human	View/Edit Mouse

Family with sequence similarity 3, member D is a protein that in humans is encoded by the FAM3D gene.
