= Myosin VIIA and Rab interacting protein =

Protein-coding gene in the species Homo sapiens

MYRIP

Identifiers
- Aliases: MYRIP, SLAC2-C, SLAC2C, myosin VIIA and Rab interacting protein
- External IDs: OMIM: 611790; MGI: 2384407; GeneCards: MYRIP

Gene location (Human)
Chr.	Chromosome 3 (human)
Band	3p22.1	Start	39,808,914 bp
Band	3p22.1	End	40,260,321 bp

Gene location (Mouse)
Chr.	Chromosome 9 (mouse)
Band	9|9 F4	Start	120,130,579 bp
Band	9|9 F4	End	120,303,907 bp
RNA expression pattern
Bgee	Human / Mouse (ortholog); Top expressed in: retinal pigment epithelium; endothelial cell; pars compacta; Epithelium of choroid plexus; Brodmann area 23; parotid gland; pars reticulata; entorhinal cortex; amygdala; orbitofrontal cortex / Top expressed in: retinal pigment epithelium; Epithelium of choroid plexus; supraoptic nucleus; parotid gland; zygote; neural layer of retina; primary oocyte; lumbar subsegment of spinal cord; prefrontal cortex; substantia nigra; More reference expression data
BioGPS	n/a
Gene ontology
Molecular function	protein kinase A binding; zinc ion binding; protein binding; metal ion binding; actin binding; myosin binding
Cellular component	cytoplasm; melanosome; perinuclear region of cytoplasm; photoreceptor outer segment; exocyst; synapse; dense core granule; transport vesicle; cytoplasmic vesicle; actin cytoskeleton; cortical actin cytoskeleton
Biological process	intracellular protein transport; positive regulation of insulin secretion; vesicle transport along actin filament
Sources:Amigo / QuickGO
Orthologs
Databases	NCBI: entry; OMA: entry
Species	Human	Mouse
Entrez	25924	245049
Ensembl	ENSG00000170011	ENSMUSG00000041794
UniProt	Q8NFW9	Q8K3I4
RefSeq (mRNA)	NM_001284423; NM_001284424; NM_001284425; NM_001284426; NM_015460	NM_144557
RefSeq (protein)	NP_001271352; NP_001271353; NP_001271354; NP_001271355; NP_056275	NP_653140
Location (UCSC)	Chr 3: 39.81 – 40.26 Mb	Chr 9: 120.13 – 120.3 Mb
PubMed search
- Wikidata
View/Edit Human	View/Edit Mouse

Myosin VIIA and Rab interacting protein is a protein that in humans is encoded by the MYRIP gene.
