= Zinc finger protein 717 =

Protein found in humans

ZNF717

Identifiers
- Aliases: ZNF717, X17, ZNF838, zinc finger protein 717, OB1
- External IDs: OMIM: 618405; MGI: 99183; GeneCards: ZNF717

Gene location (Human)
| Chr. | Chromosome 3 (human) |
| Band | 3p12.3 | Start | 75,678,660 bp |
| Band | 3p12.3 | End | 75,785,583 bp |

Gene location (Mouse)
| Chr. | Chromosome 11 (mouse) |
| Band | 11|11 B1.3 | Start | 58,778,979 bp |
| Band | 11|11 B1.3 | End | 58,795,051 bp |
RNA expression pattern
| Bgee | Human / Mouse (ortholog); Top expressed in: testicle; gonad; right uterine tube; body of pancreas; anterior pituitary; skin of abdomen; mucosa of ileum; skin of leg; body of stomach; secondary oocyte / Top expressed in: spermatid; spermatocyte; seminiferous tubule; Rostral migratory stream; cumulus cell; genital tubercle; sciatic nerve; Paneth cell; tail of embryo; primitive streak; More reference expression data |
| BioGPS | n/a |
Gene ontology
| Molecular function | DNA-binding transcription factor activity; DNA binding; metal ion binding; nucleic acid binding; DNA-binding transcription factor activity, RNA polymerase II-specific |
| Cellular component | intracellular anatomical structure; nucleus |
| Biological process | regulation of transcription, DNA-templated; transcription, DNA-templated; regulation of transcription by RNA polymerase II |
Sources:Amigo / QuickGO
Orthologs
| Databases | NCBI: entry; OMA: entry |
| Species | Human | Mouse |
| Entrez | 100131827 | 22698 |
| Ensembl | ENSG00000227124 | ENSMUSG00000037001 |
| UniProt | Q9BY31 | Q02525 |
| RefSeq (mRNA) | NM_001128223; NM_001290208; NM_001290209; NM_001290210; NM_001324026 NM_001324027; NM_001324028 | NM_011758 |
| RefSeq (protein) | NP_001121695; NP_001277137; NP_001277138; NP_001277139; NP_001310955 NP_001310956; NP_001310957 | NP_035888 |
| Location (UCSC) | Chr 3: 75.68 – 75.79 Mb | Chr 11: 58.78 – 58.8 Mb |
| PubMed search |
- Wikidata
| View/Edit Human | View/Edit Mouse |

Zinc finger protein 717 is a protein that in humans is encoded by the ZNF717 gene.

== Function ==
This gene encodes a Kruppel-associated box (KRAB) zinc-finger protein, which belongs to a large group of transcriptional regulators in mammals. These proteins bind nucleic acids and play important roles in various cellular functions, including cell proliferation, differentiation and apoptosis, and in regulating viral replication and transcription. A pseudogene of this gene was identified on chromosome 1.
