= MORC family CW-type zinc finger 1 =

Protein-coding gene in the species Homo sapiens

MORC1

Identifiers
- Aliases: MORC1, CT33, MORC, ZCW6, MORC family CW-type zinc finger 1
- External IDs: OMIM: 603205; MGI: 1316740; GeneCards: MORC1

Gene location (Human)
Chr.	Chromosome 3 (human)
Band	3q13.13	Start	108,958,248 bp
Band	3q13.13	End	109,118,134 bp

Gene location (Mouse)
Chr.	Chromosome 16 (mouse)
Band	16 B5|16 30.75 cM	Start	48,251,600 bp
Band	16 B5|16 30.75 cM	End	48,451,263 bp
RNA expression pattern
Bgee	Human / Mouse (ortholog); Top expressed in: testicle; gonad; right testis; left testis; monocyte; duodenum; placenta; anterior pituitary; hippocampus proper; substantia nigra / Top expressed in: zygote; Gonadal ridge; cartilage tissue; primary oocyte; secondary oocyte; blastocyst; morula; spermatocyte; spermatid; Meckel's cartilage; More reference expression data
BioGPS	n/a
Gene ontology
Molecular function	zinc ion binding; metal ion binding
Cellular component	nucleus; male germ cell nucleus
Biological process	multicellular organism development; cell differentiation; spermatogenesis; negative regulation of transposition; regulation of gene expression, epigenetic; DNA methylation involved in gamete generation; DNA hypermethylation; negative regulation of DNA-templated transcription, initiation; behavioral fear response; negative regulation of gene expression
Sources:Amigo / QuickGO
Orthologs
Databases	NCBI: entry; OMA: entry
Species	Human	Mouse
Entrez	27136	17450
Ensembl	ENSG00000114487	ENSMUSG00000022652
UniProt	Q86VD1	Q9WVL5
RefSeq (mRNA)	NM_014429	NM_010816
RefSeq (protein)	NP_055244	NP_034946
Location (UCSC)	Chr 3: 108.96 – 109.12 Mb	Chr 16: 48.25 – 48.45 Mb
PubMed search
- Wikidata
View/Edit Human	View/Edit Mouse

MORC family CW-type zinc finger 1 is a protein that in humans is encoded by the MORC1 gene.

== Function ==
This gene encodes the human homolog of mouse morc and like the mouse protein it is testis-specific. Mouse studies support a testis-specific function since only male knockout mice are infertile; infertility is the only apparent defect. These studies further support a role for this protein early in spermatogenesis, possibly by affecting entry into apoptosis because testis from knockout mice show greatly increased numbers of apoptotic cells. [provided by RefSeq, Jan 2009].
