= Zinc finger protein 620 =

Protein found in humans

ZNF620

Identifiers
- Aliases: ZNF620, zinc finger protein 620
- External IDs: GeneCards: ZNF620

Gene location (Human)
Chr.	Chromosome 3 (human)
Band	3p22.1	Start	40,477,131 bp
Band	3p22.1	End	40,518,736 bp
RNA expression pattern
Bgee	Human / Mouse (ortholog); Top expressed in: testicle; islet of Langerhans; ganglionic eminence; ventricular zone; skeletal muscle tissue; epithelium of colon; body of pancreas; placenta; popliteal artery; tibial arteries / n/a; More reference expression data
BioGPS	n/a
Gene ontology
Molecular function	DNA binding; metal ion binding; nucleic acid binding; DNA-binding transcription factor activity, RNA polymerase II-specific
Cellular component	intracellular anatomical structure; nucleus
Biological process	regulation of transcription, DNA-templated; transcription, DNA-templated; regulation of transcription by RNA polymerase II
Sources:Amigo / QuickGO
Orthologs
Databases	NCBI: entry; OMA: entry
Species	Human	Mouse
Entrez	253639	n/a
Ensembl	ENSG00000177842	n/a
UniProt	Q6ZNG0	n/a
RefSeq (mRNA)	NM_001256167; NM_001256168; NM_175888	n/a
RefSeq (protein)	NP_001243096; NP_001243097; NP_787084	n/a
Location (UCSC)	Chr 3: 40.48 – 40.52 Mb	n/a
PubMed search		n/a
- Wikidata
View/Edit Human

Zinc finger protein 620 is a protein that in humans is encoded by the ZNF620 gene.
