= FAM107A =

Protein-coding gene in the species Homo sapiens

Identifiers
- Aliases: FAM107A, DRR1, TU3A, family with sequence similarity 107 member A
- External IDs: OMIM: 608295; MGI: 3041256; HomoloGene: 48509; GeneCards: FAM107A; OMA:FAM107A - orthologs

Gene location (Human)
Chr.	Chromosome 3 (human)
Band	3p14.3-p14.2	Start	58,564,117 bp
Band	3p14.3-p14.2	End	58,627,610 bp

Gene location (Mouse)
Chr.	Chromosome 14 (mouse)
Band	14|14 A1	Start	14,151,750 bp
Band	14|14 A1	End	14,173,499 bp
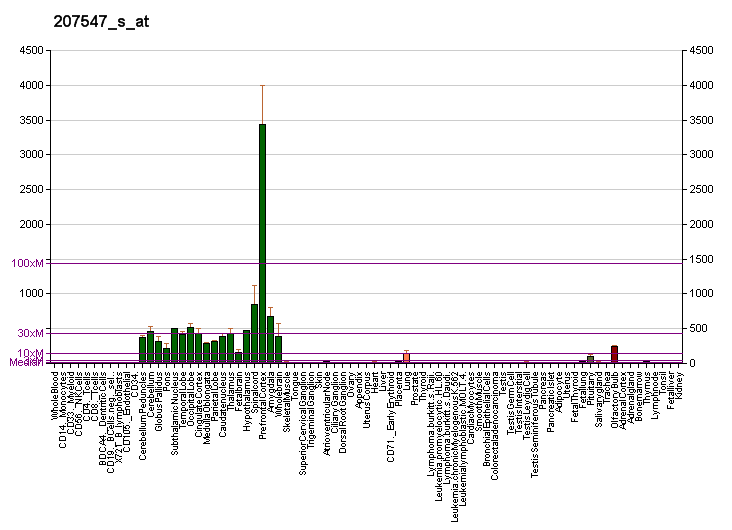

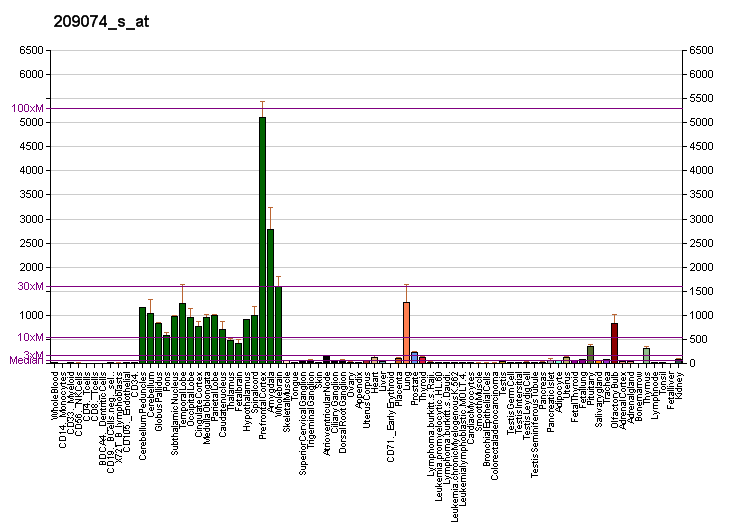
RNA expression pattern
Bgee	Human / Mouse (ortholog); Top expressed in: Region I of hippocampus proper; external globus pallidus; amygdala; right frontal lobe; C1 segment; optic nerve; putamen; nucleus accumbens; middle frontal gyrus; inferior olivary nucleus / Top expressed in: otolith organ; utricle; vestibular membrane of cochlear duct; cerebellar vermis; lobe of cerebellum; lateral septal nucleus; medial dorsal nucleus; Epithelium of choroid plexus; inferior colliculi; globus pallidus; More reference expression data
BioGPS	More reference expression data
Gene ontology
Molecular function	protein binding; molecular function; actin binding
Cellular component	neuron projection; nucleus; nuclear speck; stress fiber; cytoplasm; focal adhesion; actin cytoskeleton; ruffle membrane; synapse; cytoskeleton; plasma membrane; membrane; cell junction; cell projection
Biological process	regulation of growth; regulation of cell growth; actin filament polymerization; positive regulation of cell migration; positive regulation of protein ubiquitination; regulation of protein stability; cellular response to nutrient levels; regulation of actin cytoskeleton organization; cognition; actin filament bundle assembly; negative regulation of focal adhesion assembly; regulation of microtubule cytoskeleton organization; cellular response to glucocorticoid stimulus; negative regulation of long-term synaptic potentiation; negative regulation of G1/S transition of mitotic cell cycle; cell cycle
Sources:Amigo / QuickGO
Orthologs
Species	Human	Mouse
Entrez	11170	268709
Ensembl	ENSG00000168309	ENSMUSG00000021750
UniProt	O95990	Q78TU8
RefSeq (mRNA)	NM_001076778; NM_001282713; NM_001282714; NM_007177	NM_183187; NM_001360337; NM_001360338; NM_001360339
RefSeq (protein)	NP_001070246; NP_001269642; NP_001269643; NP_009108; NP_001269643.1	NP_001347266; NP_001347267; NP_001347268; NP_899010
Location (UCSC)	Chr 3: 58.56 – 58.63 Mb	Chr 14: 14.15 – 14.17 Mb
PubMed search
- Wikidata
View/Edit Human	View/Edit Mouse

Protein FAM107A is a protein that in humans is encoded by the FAM107A gene.
