= Chemokine-like protein TAFA-4 =

Protein-coding gene in the species Homo sapiens

TAFA4

Identifiers
- Aliases: TAFA4, TAFA-4, family with sequence similarity 19 (chemokine (C-C motif)-like), member A4, family with sequence similarity 19 member A4, C-C motif chemokine like, TAFA chemokine like family member 4, FAM19A4
- External IDs: OMIM: 617498; MGI: 2444563; HomoloGene: 18561; GeneCards: TAFA4; OMA:TAFA4 - orthologs

Gene location (Human)
Chr.	Chromosome 3 (human)
Band	3p14.1	Start	68,731,766 bp
Band	3p14.1	End	68,953,297 bp

Gene location (Mouse)
Chr.	Chromosome 6 (mouse)
Band	6|6 D3	Start	96,808,164 bp
Band	6|6 D3	End	97,037,374 bp
RNA expression pattern
Bgee	Human / Mouse (ortholog); Top expressed in: testicle; oocyte; secondary oocyte; lateral nuclear group of thalamus; right adrenal cortex; decidua; C1 segment; left adrenal gland; left adrenal cortex; prefrontal cortex / Top expressed in: lumbar spinal ganglion; cumulus cell; primary oocyte; embryo; secondary oocyte; embryo; zygote; morula; epithelium of lens; spermatid; More reference expression data
BioGPS	n/a
Gene ontology
Molecular function	protein binding; receptor ligand activity
Cellular component	extracellular region; extracellular space
Biological process	regulation of membrane potential; regulation of sensory perception of pain; phagocytosis; regulation of signaling receptor activity; superoxide anion generation; macrophage chemotaxis; signal transduction
Sources:Amigo / QuickGO
Orthologs
Species	Human	Mouse
Entrez	151647	320701
Ensembl	ENSG00000163377	ENSMUSG00000046500
UniProt	Q96LR4	Q7TPG5
RefSeq (mRNA)	NM_001005527; NM_182522	NM_177233
RefSeq (protein)	NP_001005527; NP_872328; NP_001005527.1; NP_872328.1	NP_796207
Location (UCSC)	Chr 3: 68.73 – 68.95 Mb	Chr 6: 96.81 – 97.04 Mb
PubMed search
- Wikidata
View/Edit Human	View/Edit Mouse

Chemokine-like protein TAFA-4 is a protein that in humans is encoded by the TAFA4 gene.

== Function ==
This gene is a member of the TAFA family which is composed of five highly homologous genes that encode small secreted proteins. These proteins contain conserved cysteine residues at fixed positions, and are distantly related to MIP-1alpha, a member of the CC-chemokine family. The TAFA proteins are predominantly expressed in specific regions of the brain, and are postulated to function as brain-specific chemokines or neurokines, that act as regulators of immune and nervous cells. Alternatively spliced transcript variants have been observed for this gene. [provided by RefSeq, Nov 2011].
