= Hydroxyacyl-thioester dehydratase type 2 =

Protein-coding gene in the species Homo sapiens

HTD2

Identifiers
- Aliases: HTD2, hydroxyacyl-thioester dehydratase type 2, mitochondrial, hydroxyacyl-thioester dehydratase type 2
- External IDs: MGI: 1914303; GeneCards: HTD2
Available structures
PDB	Ortholog search: PDBe RCSB
PDB	List of PDB id codes 3IR3
Enzyme activity
EC #	BRENDA	ExPASy	KEGG	MetaCyc
4.2.1.59	↗	↗	↗	↗

Gene location (Human)
Chr.	Chromosome 3 (human)
Band	3p14.3	Start	58,306,262 bp
Band	3p14.3	End	58,320,193 bp

Gene location (Mouse)
Chr.	Chromosome 14 (mouse)
Band	14|14 A1	Start	14,377,939 bp
Band	14|14 A1	End	14,389,406 bp
RNA expression pattern
Bgee	Human / Mouse (ortholog); Top expressed in: gonad; testicle; muscle of leg; gastrocnemius muscle; skeletal muscle tissue; duodenum; islet of Langerhans; left ventricle; muscle of thigh; rectum / Top expressed in: ventricular zone; seminal vesicula; embryo; embryo; morula; sternocleidomastoid muscle; epiblast; temporal muscle; triceps brachii muscle; facial motor nucleus; More reference expression data
BioGPS	n/a
Gene ontology
Molecular function	lyase activity; 3-hydroxyacyl-CoA dehydratase activity
Cellular component	nucleolus; mitochondrion; mitochondrial matrix
Biological process	fatty acid metabolic process; lipid metabolism; fatty-acyl-CoA biosynthetic process
Sources:Amigo / QuickGO
Orthologs
Databases	NCBI: entry; OMA: entry
Species	Human	Mouse
Entrez	109703458	67053
Ensembl	ENSG00000255154	ENSMUSG00000023156
UniProt	P86397	Q9CQH8
RefSeq (mRNA)	NM_001348712; NM_001348713; NM_001348714; NM_001348715	NM_025938
RefSeq (protein)	NP_001335641; NP_001335642; NP_001335643; NP_001335644	NP_080214
Location (UCSC)	Chr 3: 58.31 – 58.32 Mb	Chr 14: 14.38 – 14.39 Mb
PubMed search
- Wikidata
View/Edit Human	View/Edit Mouse

Hydroxyacyl-thioester dehydratase type 2 is a protein that in humans is encoded by the HTD2 gene.
