= Prickle planar cell polarity protein 2 =

Protein-coding gene in the species Homo sapiens

PRICKLE2

Identifiers
- Aliases: PRICKLE2, EPM5, prickle planar cell polarity protein 2
- External IDs: OMIM: 608501; MGI: 1925144; GeneCards: PRICKLE2

Gene location (Human)
Chr.	Chromosome 3 (human)
Band	3p14.1	Start	64,092,236 bp
Band	3p14.1	End	64,445,476 bp

Gene location (Mouse)
Chr.	Chromosome 6 (mouse)
Band	6|6 D1	Start	92,347,889 bp
Band	6|6 D1	End	92,683,136 bp
RNA expression pattern
Bgee	Human / Mouse (ortholog); Top expressed in: tail of epididymis; epithelium of colon; middle temporal gyrus; entorhinal cortex; Brodmann area 46; postcentral gyrus; superior frontal gyrus; Brodmann area 23; myometrium; endometrium / Top expressed in: piriform cortex; subdivision of hippocampus; Region I of hippocampus proper; amygdala; primary motor cortex; anterior amygdaloid area; subiculum; hippocampus proper; olfactory tubercle; prefrontal cortex; More reference expression data
BioGPS	n/a
Gene ontology
Molecular function	zinc ion binding; metal ion binding
Cellular component	cytoplasm; nuclear membrane; membrane; nucleus
Biological process	Wnt signaling pathway, planar cell polarity pathway
Sources:Amigo / QuickGO
Orthologs
Databases	NCBI: entry; OMA: entry
Species	Human	Mouse
Entrez	166336	243548
Ensembl	ENSG00000163637	ENSMUSG00000030020
UniProt	Q7Z3G6	Q80Y24
RefSeq (mRNA)	NM_198859; NM_001370528	NM_001081146; NM_001134459; NM_001134460; NM_001134461
RefSeq (protein)	NP_942559; NP_001357457	NP_001074615; NP_001127931; NP_001127932; NP_001127933; NP_001391015
Location (UCSC)	Chr 3: 64.09 – 64.45 Mb	Chr 6: 92.35 – 92.68 Mb
PubMed search
- Wikidata
View/Edit Human	View/Edit Mouse

Prickle planar cell polarity protein 2 is a protein that in humans is encoded by the PRICKLE2 gene.

== Function ==
This gene encodes a homolog of Drosophila prickle. The exact function of this gene is not known, however, studies in mice suggest that it may be involved in seizure prevention. Mutations in this gene are associated with progressive myoclonic epilepsy type 5. [provided by RefSeq, Dec 2011].
