= TUSC2 =

Protein-coding gene in the species Homo sapiens

Identifiers
- Aliases: TUSC2, C3orf11, FUS1, PAP, PDAP2, tumor suppressor candidate 2, tumor suppressor 2, mitochondrial calcium regulator
- External IDs: OMIM: 607052; MGI: 1931086; HomoloGene: 5264; GeneCards: TUSC2; OMA:TUSC2 - orthologs

Gene location (Human)
Chr.	Chromosome 3 (human)
Band	3p21.31	Start	50,320,027 bp
Band	3p21.31	End	50,328,251 bp

Gene location (Mouse)
Chr.	Chromosome 9 (mouse)
Band	9|9 F1	Start	107,440,454 bp
Band	9|9 F1	End	107,443,311 bp
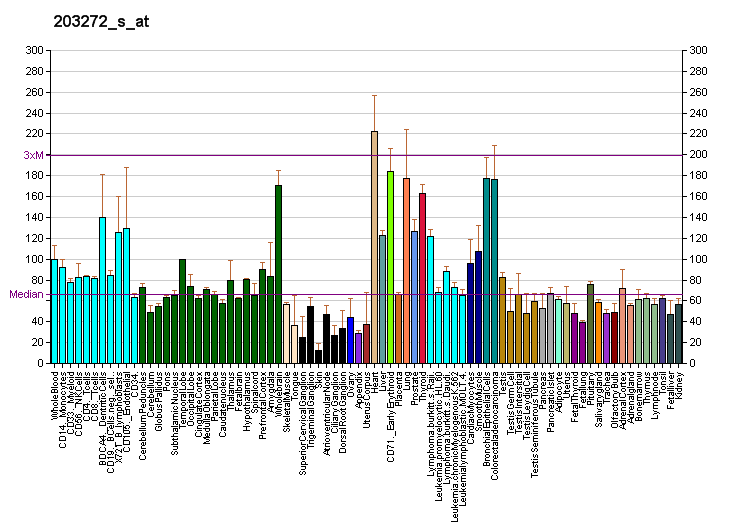

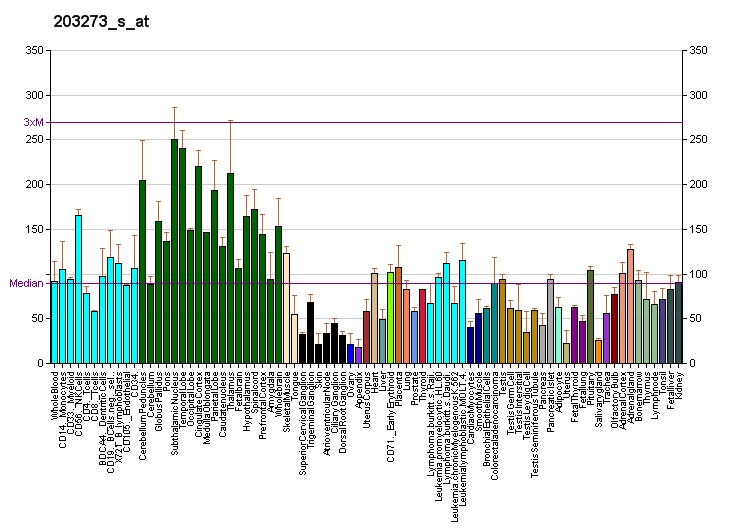
RNA expression pattern
Bgee	Human / Mouse (ortholog); Top expressed in: prefrontal cortex; cingulate gyrus; anterior cingulate cortex; right frontal lobe; Brodmann area 9; pars compacta; pars reticulata; nucleus accumbens; amygdala; lateral nuclear group of thalamus / Top expressed in: right kidney; superior frontal gyrus; muscle of thigh; primary visual cortex; dentate gyrus of hippocampal formation granule cell; gastrula; proximal tubule; neural layer of retina; cerebellar cortex; neural tube; More reference expression data
BioGPS	More reference expression data
Gene ontology
Molecular function	protein binding
Cellular component	mitochondrion
Biological process	regulation of mitochondrial membrane potential; cell-cell signaling; cell cycle; chemokine (C-C motif) ligand 5 production; cell population proliferation; inflammatory response; negative regulation of interleukin-17 production; cell maturation; neutrophil-mediated killing of gram-negative bacterium; regulation of reactive oxygen species metabolic process; defense response to Gram-negative bacterium; interleukin-15 production; positive regulation of interleukin-10 production; phagocytosis; natural killer cell differentiation
Sources:Amigo / QuickGO
Orthologs
Species	Human	Mouse
Entrez	11334	80385
Ensembl	ENSG00000114383	ENSMUSG00000010054
UniProt	O75896	Q9WVF8
RefSeq (mRNA)	NM_007275	NM_019742
RefSeq (protein)	NP_009206	NP_062716
Location (UCSC)	Chr 3: 50.32 – 50.33 Mb	Chr 9: 107.44 – 107.44 Mb
PubMed search
- Wikidata
View/Edit Human	View/Edit Mouse

Tumor suppressor candidate 2 is a protein that in humans is encoded by the TUSC2 gene.

This gene is a highly conserved lung cancer candidate gene. No other information about this gene is currently available.
