= SERP1 =

Protein-coding gene in the species Homo sapiens

Identifiers
- Aliases: SERP1, RAMP4, stress-associated endoplasmic reticulum protein 1, stress associated endoplasmic reticulum protein 1
- External IDs: OMIM: 617674; MGI: 92638; GeneCards: SERP1

Gene location (Human)
Chr.	Chromosome 3 (human)
Band	3q25.1	Start	150,541,998 bp
Band	3q25.1	End	150,603,228 bp

Gene location (Mouse)
Chr.	Chromosome 3 (mouse)
Band	3 D|3 28.58 cM	Start	58,427,238 bp
Band	3 D|3 28.58 cM	End	58,433,313 bp
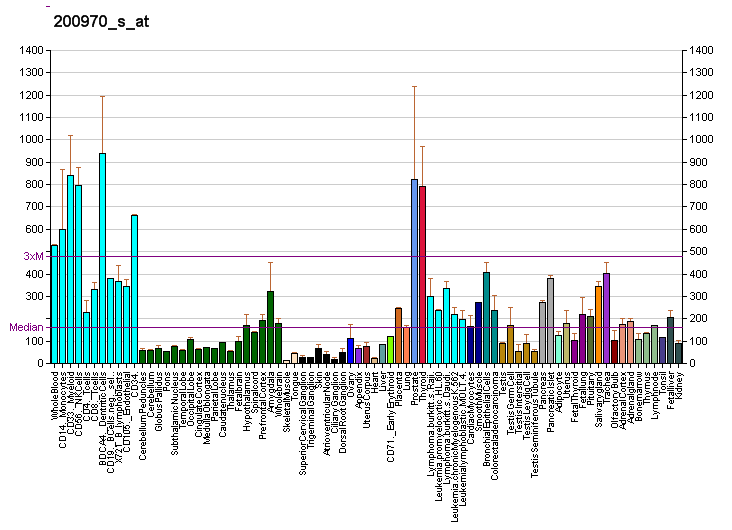

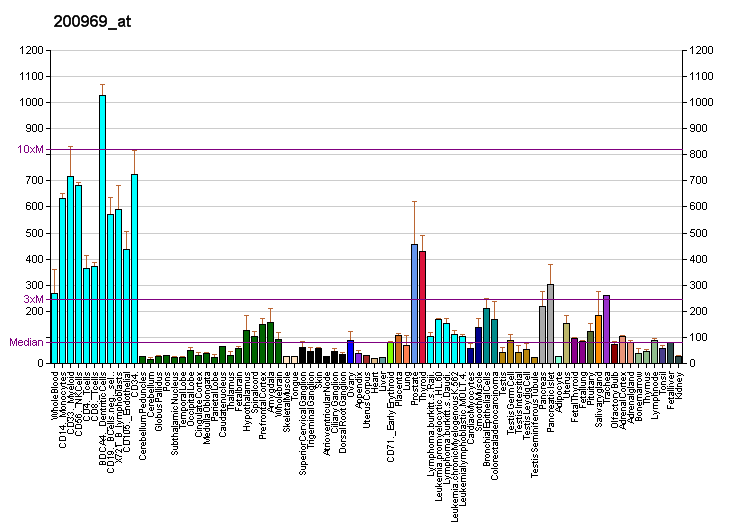

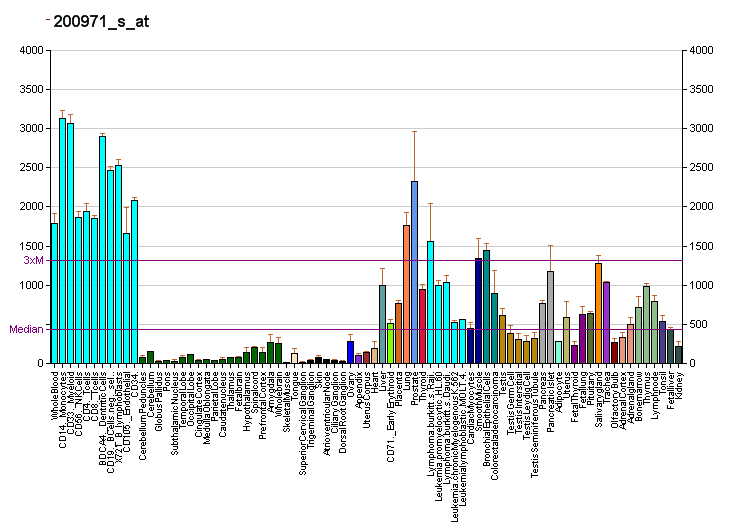
RNA expression pattern
Bgee	Human / Mouse (ortholog); Top expressed in: parotid gland; corpus epididymis; body of pancreas; caput epididymis; bronchial epithelial cell; amniotic fluid; palpebral conjunctiva; mucosa of paranasal sinus; superficial temporal artery; lower lobe of lung / Top expressed in: parotid gland; seminal vesicula; lacrimal gland; submandibular gland; crypt of lieberkuhn of small intestine; olfactory epithelium; lymph node; mesenteric lymph nodes; calvaria; pyloric antrum; More reference expression data
BioGPS	More reference expression data
Gene ontology
Molecular function	protein binding
Cellular component	integral component of membrane; cytosol; ribosome; endoplasmic reticulum membrane; membrane; endoplasmic reticulum; cytoplasmic microtubule
Biological process	skeletal system development; muscle organ morphogenesis; positive regulation of organ growth; post-embryonic development; positive regulation of translation; IRE1-mediated unfolded protein response; positive regulation of growth hormone secretion; glucose metabolic process; multicellular organism aging; protein transport; plasma membrane organization; positive regulation of insulin secretion; endoplasmic reticulum unfolded protein response; protein glycosylation
Sources:Amigo / QuickGO
Orthologs
Databases	NCBI: entry; OMA: entry
Species	Human	Mouse
Entrez	27230	28146
Ensembl	ENSG00000120742	ENSMUSG00000027808
UniProt	Q9Y6X1	Q9Z1W5
RefSeq (mRNA)	NM_014445	NM_030685
RefSeq (protein)	NP_055260	NP_109610
Location (UCSC)	Chr 3: 150.54 – 150.6 Mb	Chr 3: 58.43 – 58.43 Mb
PubMed search
- Wikidata
View/Edit Human	View/Edit Mouse

Stress-associated endoplasmic reticulum protein 1 is a protein that in humans is encoded by the SERP1 gene.
