= TTLL3 =

Protein-coding gene in the species Homo sapiens

Identifiers
- Aliases: TTLL3, HOTTL, tubulin tyrosine ligase like 3
- External IDs: MGI: 2141418; GeneCards: TTLL3

Gene location (Human)
Chr.	Chromosome 3 (human)
Band	3p25.3	Start	9,808,086 bp
Band	3p25.3	End	9,855,138 bp

Gene location (Mouse)
Chr.	Chromosome 6 (mouse)
Band	6|6 E3	Start	113,366,221 bp
Band	6|6 E3	End	113,391,548 bp
RNA expression pattern
Bgee	Human / Mouse (ortholog); Top expressed in: right uterine tube; left ovary; right ovary; canal of the cervix; right testis; left testis; sural nerve; left uterine tube; granulocyte; gastric mucosa / Top expressed in: granulocyte; Rostral migratory stream; spermatid; utricle; neural layer of retina; seminiferous tubule; cerebellar cortex; lumbar spinal ganglion; olfactory epithelium; spermatocyte; More reference expression data
BioGPS	n/a
Gene ontology
Molecular function	ATP binding; protein-glycine ligase activity, initiating; nucleotide binding; ligase activity; protein-glycine ligase activity
Cellular component	microtubule; axoneme; microtubule cytoskeleton; cytoplasm; cell projection; cilium; cytoskeleton; cytosol
Biological process	axoneme assembly; cilium assembly; protein polyglycylation
Sources:Amigo / QuickGO
Orthologs
Databases	NCBI: entry; OMA: entry
Species	Human	Mouse
Entrez	26140	101100
Ensembl	ENSG00000214021	ENSMUSG00000030276
UniProt	Q9Y4R7	A4Q9E5
RefSeq (mRNA)	NM_001025930; NM_015644; NM_001366051	NM_001142732; NM_133923
RefSeq (protein)	NP_001021100; NP_001352980	NP_001136204; NP_598684
Location (UCSC)	Chr 3: 9.81 – 9.86 Mb	Chr 6: 113.37 – 113.39 Mb
PubMed search
- Wikidata
View/Edit Human	View/Edit Mouse

Tubulin tyrosine ligase-like family, member 3 is a protein that in humans is encoded by the TTLL3 gene.
