= Zinc finger protein 197 =

Protein found in humans

ZNF197

Identifiers
- Aliases: ZNF197, D3S1363E, P18, VHLaK, ZKSCAN9, ZNF166, ZNF20, ZSCAN41, zinc finger protein 197
- External IDs: OMIM: 618359; GeneCards: ZNF197

Gene location (Human)
Chr.	Chromosome 3 (human)
Band	3p21.31	Start	44,584,888 bp
Band	3p21.31	End	44,648,471 bp
RNA expression pattern
Bgee	Human / Mouse (ortholog); Top expressed in: ganglionic eminence; ventricular zone; Achilles tendon; corpus callosum; skeletal muscle tissue; testicle; islet of Langerhans; gastrocnemius muscle; endometrium; stromal cell of endometrium / n/a; More reference expression data
BioGPS	n/a
Gene ontology
Molecular function	DNA binding; metal ion binding; nucleic acid binding; DNA-binding transcription factor activity; DNA-binding transcription factor activity, RNA polymerase II-specific
Cellular component	nucleus; intracellular anatomical structure
Biological process	transcription, DNA-templated; regulation of transcription, DNA-templated; regulation of transcription by RNA polymerase II
Sources:Amigo / QuickGO
Orthologs
Databases	NCBI: entry; OMA: entry
Species	Human	Mouse
Entrez	10168	n/a
Ensembl	ENSG00000281709; ENSG00000186448	n/a
UniProt	O14709	n/a
RefSeq (mRNA)	NM_001024855; NM_001323293; NM_001323294; NM_001323295; NM_001323296 NM_006991	n/a
RefSeq (protein)	NP_001020026; NP_001310222; NP_001310223; NP_001310224; NP_001310225 NP_008922	n/a
Location (UCSC)	Chr 3: 44.58 – 44.65 Mb	n/a
PubMed search		n/a
- Wikidata
View/Edit Human

Zinc finger protein 197 is a protein that in humans is encoded by the ZNF197 gene.

== Function ==
This gene product belongs to the zinc finger protein superfamily, members of which are regulatory proteins characterized by nucleic acid-binding zinc finger domains. The encoded protein contains 20 tandemly arrayed C2H2-type zinc fingers, a Kruppel-associated box (KRAB) domain, and a SCAN box. This transcript turns over rapidly and contains 3' UTR AUUUA motifs, which are often a hallmark of rapid turnover. It is overexpressed in some thyroid papillary carcinomas. This gene is located in a cluster of zinc finger genes at 3p21. Naturally occurring readthrough transcription is observed between this gene and the upstream zinc finger protein 660 gene and is represented by GeneID:110354863.
