= LSG1 =

Protein-coding gene in the species Homo sapiens

Identifiers
- Aliases: LSG1, large 60S subunit nuclear export GTPase 1
- External IDs: OMIM: 610780; MGI: 107236; HomoloGene: 5917; GeneCards: LSG1; OMA:LSG1 - orthologs

Gene location (Human)
Chr.	Chromosome 3 (human)
Band	3q29	Start	194,640,791 bp
Band	3q29	End	194,672,463 bp

Gene location (Mouse)
Chr.	Chromosome 16 (mouse)
Band	16 B2|16 21.34 cM	Start	30,379,312 bp
Band	16 B2|16 21.34 cM	End	30,406,410 bp
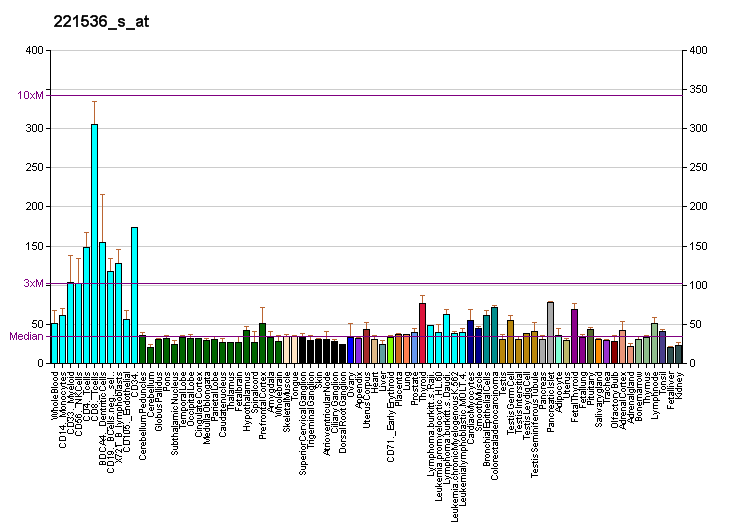

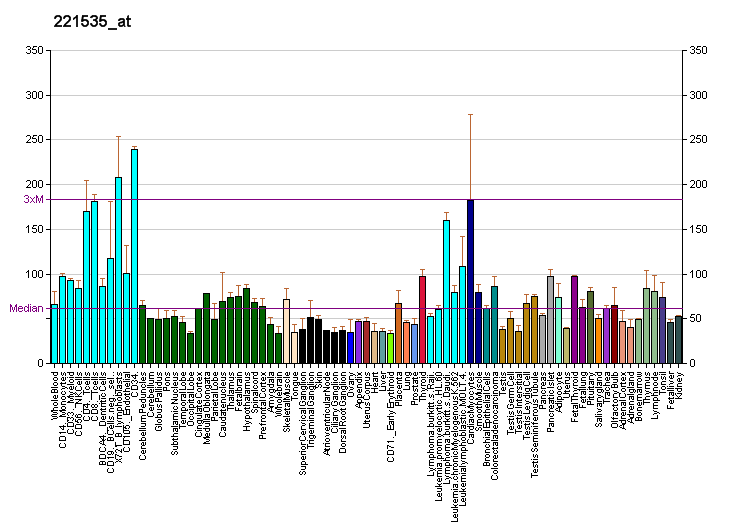
RNA expression pattern
Bgee	Human / Mouse (ortholog); Top expressed in: granulocyte; rectum; right lobe of liver; Achilles tendon; skin of abdomen; body of pancreas; skin of leg; upper lobe of left lung; lymph node; right ovary / Top expressed in: spermatocyte; tail of embryo; genital tubercle; epiblast; spermatid; ventricular zone; embryo; morula; morula; yolk sac; More reference expression data
BioGPS	More reference expression data
Gene ontology
Molecular function	nucleotide binding; GTP binding; hydrolase activity; GTPase activity
Cellular component	Cajal body; endoplasmic reticulum; nucleus; membrane; cytoplasm; nuclear body; cytosol
Biological process	protein transport; nuclear export; ribosome biogenesis; transport
Sources:Amigo / QuickGO
Orthologs
Species	Human	Mouse
Entrez	55341	224092
Ensembl	ENSG00000041802	ENSMUSG00000022538
UniProt	Q9H089	Q3UM18
RefSeq (mRNA)	NM_018385	NM_178069
RefSeq (protein)	NP_060855	NP_835170
Location (UCSC)	Chr 3: 194.64 – 194.67 Mb	Chr 16: 30.38 – 30.41 Mb
PubMed search
- Wikidata
View/Edit Human	View/Edit Mouse

Large subunit GTPase 1 homolog is an enzyme that in humans is encoded by the LSG1 gene.
