= TRAT1 =

Protein-coding gene in the species Homo sapiens

Identifiers
- Aliases: TRAT1, TCRIM, TRIM, HSPC062, pp29/30, T cell receptor associated transmembrane adaptor 1, T-cell receptor associated transmembrane adaptor 1
- External IDs: OMIM: 604962; MGI: 1924897; HomoloGene: 41130; GeneCards: TRAT1; OMA:TRAT1 - orthologs

Gene location (Human)
Chr.	Chromosome 3 (human)
Band	3q13.13	Start	108,822,770 bp
Band	3q13.13	End	108,855,005 bp

Gene location (Mouse)
Chr.	Chromosome 16 (mouse)
Band	16|16 B5	Start	48,551,137 bp
Band	16|16 B5	End	48,592,384 bp
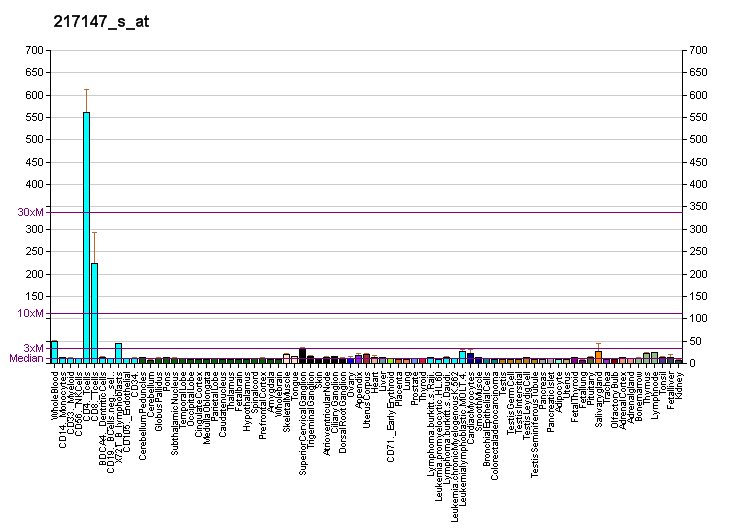
RNA expression pattern
Bgee	Human / Mouse (ortholog); Top expressed in: thymus; buccal mucosa cell; lymph node; testicle; blood; granulocyte; appendix; epithelium of nasopharynx; spleen; epithelium of colon / Top expressed in: thymus; blood; mesenteric lymph nodes; embryo; spleen; subcutaneous adipose tissue; superior frontal gyrus; gastrula; primary visual cortex; vastus lateralis muscle; More reference expression data
BioGPS	More reference expression data
Gene ontology
Molecular function	transmembrane receptor protein tyrosine kinase adaptor activity; phosphatidylinositol-4,5-bisphosphate 3-kinase activity
Cellular component	integral component of membrane; membrane; plasma membrane; integral component of plasma membrane; T cell receptor complex
Biological process	positive regulation of calcium-mediated signaling; adaptive immune response; immune system process; positive regulation of T cell receptor signaling pathway; negative regulation of transport; cellular defense response; T cell receptor signaling pathway; negative regulation of receptor recycling; signal transduction; phosphatidylinositol phosphate biosynthetic process; transmembrane receptor protein tyrosine kinase signaling pathway; positive regulation of protein kinase B signaling
Sources:Amigo / QuickGO
Orthologs
Species	Human	Mouse
Entrez	50852	77647
Ensembl	ENSG00000163519	ENSMUSG00000030775
UniProt	Q6PIZ9	Q3UU67
RefSeq (mRNA)	NM_016388; NM_001317747	NM_198297
RefSeq (protein)	NP_001304676; NP_057472	NP_938039
Location (UCSC)	Chr 3: 108.82 – 108.86 Mb	Chr 16: 48.55 – 48.59 Mb
PubMed search
- Wikidata
View/Edit Human	View/Edit Mouse

T-cell receptor-associated transmembrane adapter 1 is a protein that in humans is encoded by the TRAT1 gene.
