= 3-hydroxyacyl-CoA dehydratase 2 =

Enzyme found in humans

HACD2

Identifiers
- Aliases: HACD2, PTPLB, 3-hydroxyacyl-CoA dehydratase 2
- External IDs: OMIM: 615939; MGI: 1918007; GeneCards: HACD2
Enzyme activity
EC #	BRENDA	ExPASy	KEGG	MetaCyc
4.2.1.134	↗	↗	↗	↗

Gene location (Human)
Chr.	Chromosome 3 (human)
Band	3q21.1	Start	123,490,820 bp
Band	3q21.1	End	123,585,053 bp

Gene location (Mouse)
Chr.	Chromosome 16 (mouse)
Band	16|16 B3	Start	34,842,798 bp
Band	16|16 B3	End	34,929,547 bp
RNA expression pattern
Bgee	Human / Mouse (ortholog); Top expressed in: gingival epithelium; external globus pallidus; vulva; jejunal mucosa; skin of thigh; skin of hip; endothelial cell; mucosa of colon; mucosa of sigmoid colon; human penis / Top expressed in: right kidney; tail of embryo; lip; yolk sac; genital tubercle; zygote; esophagus; granulocyte; embryo; embryo; More reference expression data
BioGPS	n/a
Gene ontology
Molecular function	protein tyrosine phosphatase activity; enzyme binding; 3-hydroxyacyl-CoA dehydratase activity; protein binding; lyase activity; 3R-hydroxyacyl-CoA dehydratase activity; 3-hydroxy-behenoyl-CoA dehydratase activity; 3-hydroxy-lignoceroyl-CoA dehydratase activity; 3-hydroxy-arachidoyl-CoA dehydratase activity; very-long-chain 3-hydroxyacyl-CoA dehydratase activity
Cellular component	integral component of membrane; endoplasmic reticulum membrane; endoplasmic reticulum; membrane; integral component of endoplasmic reticulum membrane
Biological process	fatty acid elongation; fatty acid biosynthetic process; sphingolipid biosynthetic process; long-chain fatty-acyl-CoA biosynthetic process; very long-chain fatty acid biosynthetic process; fatty acid metabolic process; lipid metabolism; peptidyl-tyrosine dephosphorylation
Sources:Amigo / QuickGO
Orthologs
Databases	NCBI: entry; OMA: entry
Species	Human	Mouse
Entrez	201562	70757
Ensembl	ENSG00000206527	ENSMUSG00000035376
UniProt	Q6Y1H2	Q9D3B1
RefSeq (mRNA)	NM_001329783; NM_001329784; NM_001329786; NM_001329787; NM_198402	NM_023587
RefSeq (protein)	NP_001316712; NP_001316713; NP_001316715; NP_001316716; NP_940684	NP_076076
Location (UCSC)	Chr 3: 123.49 – 123.59 Mb	Chr 16: 34.84 – 34.93 Mb
PubMed search
- Wikidata
View/Edit Human	View/Edit Mouse

3-hydroxyacyl-CoA dehydratase 2 is an enzyme that in humans is encoded by the HACD2 gene.

== Function ==
The protein encoded by this gene can catalyze the third step (dehydration) in the conversion of long chain fatty acids to very long chain fatty acids. The encoded protein localizes to the endoplasmic reticulum membrane.
