= Zinc finger BED-type containing 2 =

Protein-coding gene in the species Homo sapiens

ZBED2

Identifiers
- Aliases: ZBED2, zinc finger BED-type containing 2
- External IDs: OMIM: 615246; GeneCards: ZBED2
Available structures
PDB	Human UniProt search: PDBe RCSB
PDB	List of PDB id codes 2DJR

Gene location (Human)
Chr.	Chromosome 3 (human)
Band	3q13.13	Start	111,592,900 bp
Band	3q13.13	End	111,595,346 bp
RNA expression pattern
Bgee	Human / Mouse (ortholog); Top expressed in: amniotic fluid; left lobe of thyroid gland; thymus; right lobe of thyroid gland; oral cavity; gums; gingival epithelium; testicle; vulva; right uterine tube / n/a; More reference expression data
BioGPS	n/a
Orthologs
Databases	NCBI: entry; OMA: entry
Species	Human	Mouse
Entrez	79413	n/a
Ensembl	ENSG00000177494	n/a
UniProt	Q9BTP6	n/a
RefSeq (mRNA)	NM_024508	n/a
RefSeq (protein)	NP_078784	n/a
Location (UCSC)	Chr 3: 111.59 – 111.6 Mb	n/a
PubMed search		n/a
- Wikidata
View/Edit Human

Zinc finger BED-type containing 2 is a protein that in humans is encoded by the ZBED2 gene.
