= Doublecortin like kinase 3 =

Protein-coding gene in the species Homo sapiens

DCLK3

Identifiers
- Aliases: DCLK3, CLR, DCAMKL3, DCDC3C, DCK3, doublecortin like kinase 3
- External IDs: OMIM: 613167; MGI: 3039580; GeneCards: DCLK3
Enzyme activity
EC #	BRENDA	ExPASy	KEGG	MetaCyc
2.7.11.1	↗	↗	↗	↗

Gene location (Human)
Chr.	Chromosome 3 (human)
Band	3p22.2	Start	36,712,421 bp
Band	3p22.2	End	36,764,553 bp

Gene location (Mouse)
Chr.	Chromosome 9 (mouse)
Band	9|9 F3	Start	111,268,149 bp
Band	9|9 F3	End	111,318,186 bp
RNA expression pattern
Bgee	Human / Mouse (ortholog); Top expressed in: sural nerve; testicle; gonad; ganglionic eminence; nucleus accumbens; trigeminal ganglion; caudate nucleus; putamen; spinal ganglia; prefrontal cortex / Top expressed in: olfactory tubercle; nucleus accumbens; superior frontal gyrus; right kidney; sciatic nerve; anterior amygdaloid area; globus pallidus; proximal tubule; hair follicle; lumbar spinal ganglion; More reference expression data
BioGPS	n/a
Gene ontology
Molecular function	transferase activity; nucleotide binding; protein kinase activity; ATP binding; kinase activity; protein serine/threonine kinase activity
Cellular component	nucleus; cytoplasm
Biological process	protein phosphorylation; phosphorylation; negative regulation of protein localization to nucleus; peptidyl-serine phosphorylation; peptidyl-threonine phosphorylation; intracellular signal transduction
Sources:Amigo / QuickGO
Orthologs
Databases	NCBI: entry; OMA: entry
Species	Human	Mouse
Entrez	85443	245038
Ensembl	ENSG00000163673	ENSMUSG00000032500
UniProt	Q9C098	Q8BWQ5
RefSeq (mRNA)	NM_033403; NM_001394672	NM_172928
RefSeq (protein)	NP_208382	NP_766516
Location (UCSC)	Chr 3: 36.71 – 36.76 Mb	Chr 9: 111.27 – 111.32 Mb
PubMed search
- Wikidata
View/Edit Human	View/Edit Mouse

Doublecortin like kinase 3 is a protein that in humans is encoded by the DCLK3 gene.
