= RETNLB =

Protein-coding gene in the species Homo sapiens

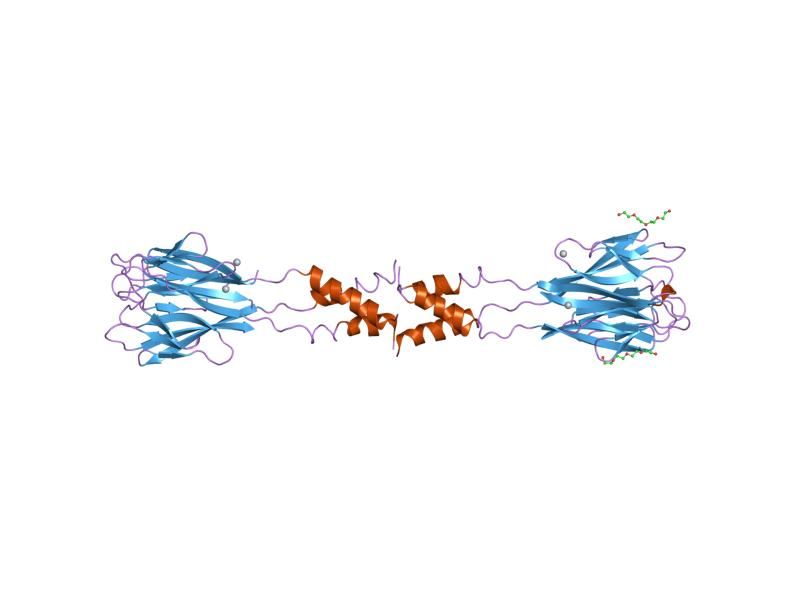

Identifiers
- Aliases: RETNLB, FIZZ1, FIZZ2, HXCP2, RELM-beta, RELMb, RELMbeta, XCP2, resistin like beta
- External IDs: OMIM: 605645; MGI: 1888505; HomoloGene: 10735; GeneCards: RETNLB; OMA:RETNLB - orthologs

Gene location (Human)
Chr.	Chromosome 3 (human)
Band	3q13.13	Start	108,743,424 bp
Band	3q13.13	End	108,757,410 bp

Gene location (Mouse)
Chr.	Chromosome 16 (mouse)
Band	16 B5|16 30.75 cM	Start	48,637,219 bp
Band	16 B5|16 30.75 cM	End	48,639,255 bp
RNA expression pattern
Bgee	Human / Mouse (ortholog); Top expressed in: mucosa of ileum; rectum; mucosa of sigmoid colon; mucosa of transverse colon; testicle; duodenum; jejunal mucosa; epithelium of colon; appendix; oocyte / Top expressed in: granulocyte; mucosa of large intestine; embryo; epithelium of colon; left colon; ileum; Paneth cell; duodenum; crypt of lieberkuhn of small intestine; sexually immature organism; More reference expression data
BioGPS	n/a
Gene ontology
Molecular function	hormone activity; molecular function
Cellular component	extracellular region; extracellular space; cellular component
Biological process	cell population proliferation; regulation of signaling receptor activity; signal transduction
Sources:Amigo / QuickGO
Orthologs
Species	Human	Mouse
Entrez	84666	57263
Ensembl	ENSG00000163515	ENSMUSG00000022650
UniProt	Q9BQ08	Q99P86
RefSeq (mRNA)	NM_032579	NM_023881
RefSeq (protein)	NP_115968	NP_076370
Location (UCSC)	Chr 3: 108.74 – 108.76 Mb	Chr 16: 48.64 – 48.64 Mb
PubMed search
- Wikidata
View/Edit Human	View/Edit Mouse

Resistin-like beta is a protein that in humans is encoded by the RETNLB gene.
