= HEMK1 =

Protein-coding gene in the species Homo sapiens

Identifiers
- Aliases: HEMK1, HEMK, MTQ1, HemK methyltransferase family member 1, MPRMC
- External IDs: MGI: 1916786; GeneCards: HEMK1
Enzyme activity
EC #	BRENDA	ExPASy	KEGG	MetaCyc
2.1.1.297	↗	↗	↗	↗

Gene location (Human)
Chr.	Chromosome 3 (human)
Band	3p21.31	Start	50,569,152 bp
Band	3p21.31	End	50,596,168 bp

Gene location (Mouse)
Chr.	Chromosome 9 (mouse)
Band	9|9 F1	Start	107,327,084 bp
Band	9|9 F1	End	107,338,350 bp
RNA expression pattern
Bgee	Human / Mouse (ortholog); Top expressed in: right uterine tube; right lobe of thyroid gland; right lobe of liver; left lobe of thyroid gland; mucosa of transverse colon; right testis; granulocyte; apex of heart; right adrenal gland; left testis / Top expressed in: Epithelium of choroid plexus; neural layer of retina; spermatocyte; brown adipose tissue; muscle of thigh; proximal tubule; skeletal muscle tissue; soleus muscle; right kidney; epiblast; More reference expression data
BioGPS	n/a
Gene ontology
Molecular function	N-methyltransferase activity; DNA binding; nucleic acid binding; methyltransferase activity; protein methyltransferase activity; transferase activity; protein binding; S-adenosylmethionine-dependent methyltransferase activity; protein-(glutamine-N5) methyltransferase activity
Cellular component	mitochondrion
Biological process	DNA methylation; protein methylation; methylation
Sources:Amigo / QuickGO
Orthologs
Databases	NCBI: entry; OMA: entry
Species	Human	Mouse
Entrez	51409	69536
Ensembl	ENSG00000114735	ENSMUSG00000032579
UniProt	Q9Y5R4	Q921L7
RefSeq (mRNA)	NM_016173; NM_001317851; NM_001377420; NM_001377421; NM_001377422 NM_001377423; NM_001377424; NM_001377425; NM_001377426; NM_001377427; NM_001377428; NM_001377429	NM_133984
RefSeq (protein)	NP_001304780; NP_057257; NP_001364349; NP_001364350; NP_001364351 NP_001364352; NP_001364353; NP_001364354; NP_001364355; NP_001364356; NP_001364357; NP_001364358	NP_598745
Location (UCSC)	Chr 3: 50.57 – 50.6 Mb	Chr 9: 107.33 – 107.34 Mb
PubMed search
- Wikidata
View/Edit Human	View/Edit Mouse

HemK methyltransferase family member 1 is a protein that in humans is encoded by the HEMK1 gene.
