= Mab-21 domain containing 2 =

Protein-coding gene in the species Homo sapiens

MB21D2

Identifiers
- Aliases: MB21D2, Mb21d2, 1600021P15Rik, A430031N04, C87006, C3orf59, Mab-21 domain containing 2, hMB21D2
- External IDs: MGI: 1917028; HomoloGene: 18614; GeneCards: MB21D2; OMA:MB21D2 - orthologs

Gene location (Human)
Chr.	Chromosome 3 (human)
Band	3q29	Start	192,796,815 bp
Band	3q29	End	192,917,856 bp

Gene location (Mouse)
Chr.	Chromosome 16 (mouse)
Band	16|16 B2	Start	28,644,928 bp
Band	16|16 B2	End	28,748,425 bp
RNA expression pattern
Bgee	Human / Mouse (ortholog); Top expressed in: secondary oocyte; endothelial cell; vena cava; middle temporal gyrus; pericardium; saphenous vein; placenta; buccal mucosa cell; testicle; mucosa of ileum / Top expressed in: otolith organ; utricle; lateral geniculate nucleus; zygote; medial dorsal nucleus; olfactory epithelium; otic vesicle; medial geniculate nucleus; fossa; secondary oocyte; More reference expression data
BioGPS	n/a
Orthologs
Species	Human	Mouse
Entrez	151963	239796
Ensembl	ENSG00000180611	ENSMUSG00000051065
UniProt	Q8IYB1	Q8C525
RefSeq (mRNA)	NM_178496	NM_177718
RefSeq (protein)	NP_848591	NP_808386; NP_001392828; NP_001392829
Location (UCSC)	Chr 3: 192.8 – 192.92 Mb	Chr 16: 28.64 – 28.75 Mb
PubMed search
- Wikidata
View/Edit Human	View/Edit Mouse

Mab-21 domain containing 2 is a protein in humans that is encoded by the MB21D2 gene.
