= CLDND1 =

Protein-coding gene in the species Homo sapiens

Identifiers
- Aliases: CLDND1, C3orf4, GENX-3745, claudin domain containing 1, Z38
- External IDs: MGI: 2447860; HomoloGene: 10534; GeneCards: CLDND1; OMA:CLDND1 - orthologs

Gene location (Human)
Chr.	Chromosome 3 (human)
Band	3q11.2|3q12.1	Start	98,497,912 bp
Band	3q11.2|3q12.1	End	98,523,066 bp

Gene location (Mouse)
Chr.	Chromosome 16 (mouse)
Band	16|16 C1.2	Start	58,548,273 bp
Band	16|16 C1.2	End	58,554,614 bp
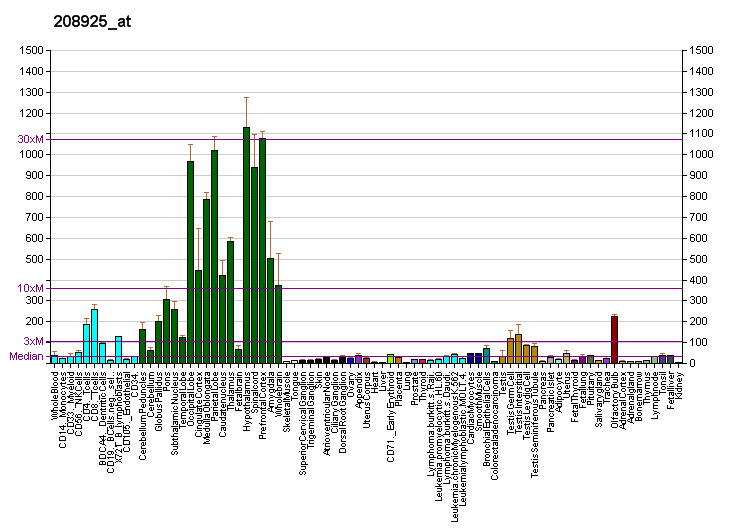
RNA expression pattern
Bgee	Human / Mouse (ortholog); Top expressed in: corpus callosum; C1 segment; middle frontal gyrus; inferior ganglion of vagus nerve; globus pallidus; internal globus pallidus; pons; subthalamic nucleus; external globus pallidus; pars reticulata / Top expressed in: Rostral migratory stream; epithelium of stomach; neural layer of retina; spermatid; genital tubercle; sternocleidomastoid muscle; triceps brachii muscle; human fetus; pyloric antrum; medial ganglionic eminence; More reference expression data
BioGPS	More reference expression data
Orthologs
Species	Human	Mouse
Entrez	56650	224250
Ensembl	ENSG00000080822	ENSMUSG00000022744
UniProt	Q9NY35	Q9CQX5
RefSeq (mRNA)	NM_019895; NM_001040181; NM_001040182; NM_001040183; NM_001040184 NM_001040199; NM_001040200	NM_001252450; NM_001252451; NM_171826; NM_001356488
RefSeq (protein)	NP_001035271; NP_001035272; NP_001035273; NP_001035289; NP_001035290 NP_063948	NP_001239379; NP_001239380; NP_741968; NP_001343417
Location (UCSC)	Chr 3: 98.5 – 98.52 Mb	Chr 16: 58.55 – 58.55 Mb
PubMed search
- Wikidata
View/Edit Human	View/Edit Mouse

Claudin domain-containing protein 1 is a protein that in humans is encoded by the CLDND1 gene.
