= Deleted in lung and esophageal cancer 1 =

Protein-coding gene in the species Homo sapiens

DLEC1

Identifiers
- Aliases: DLEC1, CFAP81, DLC1, F56, DLC-1, deleted in lung and esophageal cancer 1, cilia and flagella associated protein, DLEC1 cilia and flagella associated protein, FAP81
- External IDs: OMIM: 604050; MGI: 2443671; GeneCards: DLEC1

Gene location (Human)
Chr.	Chromosome 3 (human)
Band	3p22.2	Start	38,039,205 bp
Band	3p22.2	End	38,124,025 bp

Gene location (Mouse)
Chr.	Chromosome 9 (mouse)
Band	9|9 F3	Start	118,931,546 bp
Band	9|9 F3	End	118,977,314 bp
RNA expression pattern
Bgee	Human / Mouse (ortholog); Top expressed in: right uterine tube; epithelium of bronchus; bronchial epithelial cell; olfactory zone of nasal mucosa; mucosa of paranasal sinus; nasal epithelium; left testis; right testis; caput epididymis; epithelium of nasopharynx / Top expressed in: spermatid; renal cortex; spermatocyte; testicle; proximal tubule; human kidney; right kidney; ovary; hypothalamus; zygote; More reference expression data
BioGPS	n/a
Gene ontology
Molecular function	molecular function
Cellular component	cytoplasm; cytosol
Biological process	negative regulation of cell population proliferation
Sources:Amigo / QuickGO
Orthologs
Databases	NCBI: entry; OMA: entry
Species	Human	Mouse
Entrez	9940	320256
Ensembl	ENSG00000008226	ENSMUSG00000038060
UniProt	Q9Y238; Q32W76	Q8BLA1
RefSeq (mRNA)	NM_007335; NM_007336; NM_007337; NM_007338; NM_001321153	NM_177117; NM_001368820; NM_001368821
RefSeq (protein)	NP_001308082; NP_031361; NP_031363	n/a
Location (UCSC)	Chr 3: 38.04 – 38.12 Mb	Chr 9: 118.93 – 118.98 Mb
PubMed search
- Wikidata
View/Edit Human	View/Edit Mouse

Deleted in lung and esophageal cancer 1 is a protein that in humans is encoded by the DLEC1 gene.

== Function ==
The cytogenetic location of this gene is 3p21.3, and it is located in a region that is commonly deleted in a variety of malignancies. Down-regulation of this gene has been observed in several human cancers including lung, esophageal, renal tumors, and head and neck squamous cell carcinoma. In some cases, reduced expression of this gene in tumor cells is a result of aberrant promoter methylation. Several alternatively spliced transcripts have been observed that contain disrupted coding regions and likely encode nonfunctional proteins.[provided by RefSeq, Mar 2016].
