= SENP7 =

Protein-coding gene in the species Homo sapiens

Identifiers
- Aliases: SENP7, SUMO1/sentrin specific peptidase 7, SUMO specific peptidase 7
- External IDs: OMIM: 612846; MGI: 1913565; GeneCards: SENP7
Available structures
PDB	Ortholog search: PDBe RCSB
PDB	List of PDB id codes 3EAY

Gene location (Human)
Chr.	Chromosome 3 (human)
Band	3q12.3	Start	101,324,205 bp
Band	3q12.3	End	101,513,241 bp

Gene location (Mouse)
Chr.	Chromosome 16 (mouse)
Band	16|16 C1.1	Start	55,868,701 bp
Band	16|16 C1.1	End	56,010,375 bp
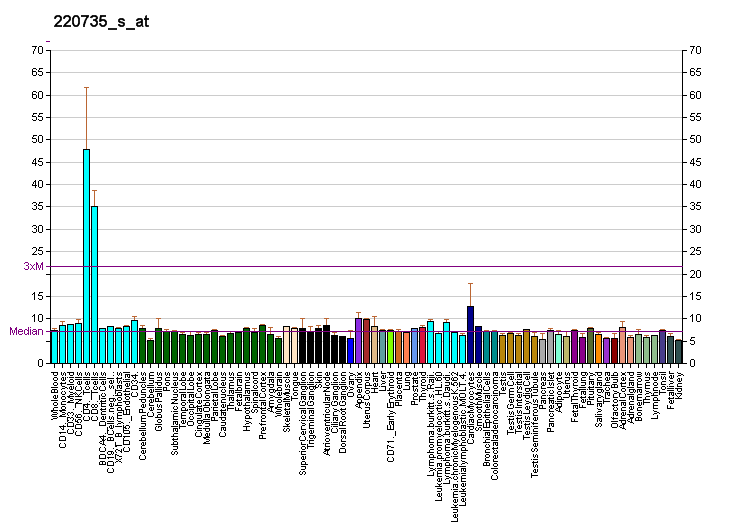
RNA expression pattern
Bgee	Human / Mouse (ortholog); Top expressed in: Achilles tendon; left ovary; right ovary; ganglionic eminence; ventricular zone; tibia; body of uterus; testicle; right uterine tube; gastric mucosa / Top expressed in: Rostral migratory stream; genital tubercle; hand; ciliary body; tail of embryo; superior cervical ganglion; retinal pigment epithelium; otolith organ; utricle; granulocyte; More reference expression data
BioGPS	More reference expression data
Gene ontology
Molecular function	peptidase activity; cysteine-type peptidase activity; protein binding; hydrolase activity; G protein-coupled receptor activity; SUMO-specific endopeptidase activity
Cellular component	intracellular anatomical structure; nucleus; plasma membrane; cytoplasm
Biological process	proteolysis; adenylate cyclase-modulating G protein-coupled receptor signaling pathway; protein desumoylation
Sources:Amigo / QuickGO
Orthologs
Databases	NCBI: entry; OMA: entry
Species	Human	Mouse
Entrez	57337	66315
Ensembl	ENSG00000138468	ENSMUSG00000052917
UniProt	Q9BQF6	Q8BUH8
RefSeq (mRNA)	NM_001077203; NM_001282801; NM_001282802; NM_001282803; NM_001282804 NM_020654	NM_001003971; NM_001003972; NM_001003973; NM_025483; NM_001304503 NM_001360073
RefSeq (protein)	NP_001070671; NP_001269730; NP_001269731; NP_001269732; NP_001269733 NP_065705	NP_001003972; NP_001003973; NP_001291432; NP_079759; NP_001347002
Location (UCSC)	Chr 3: 101.32 – 101.51 Mb	Chr 16: 55.87 – 56.01 Mb
PubMed search
- Wikidata
View/Edit Human	View/Edit Mouse

Sentrin-specific protease 7 is an enzyme that in humans is encoded by the SENP7 gene.
