= LINC01279 =

Identifiers
- Aliases: LINC01279, long intergenic non-protein coding RNA 1279
- External IDs: GeneCards: LINC01279
Orthologs
Databases	NCBI: entry
Species	Human	Mouse
Entrez	100506621	n/a
Ensembl	n/a	n/a
UniProt	n a	n/a
RefSeq (mRNA)	n/a	n/a
RefSeq (protein)	n/a	n/a
Location (UCSC)	n/a	n/a
PubMed search		n/a
- Wikidata
View/Edit Human

Long intergenic non-protein coding RNA 1279 is a protein that in humans is encoded by the LINC01279 gene.
