= PROSER1 =

Identifiers
- Aliases: PROSER1, C13orf23, proline and serine rich 1
- External IDs: MGI: 1919933; GeneCards: PROSER1

Gene location (Human)
Chr.	Chromosome 13 (human)
Band	13q13.3	Start	39,009,865 bp
Band	13q13.3	End	39,038,089 bp

Gene location (Mouse)
Chr.	Chromosome 3 (mouse)
Band	3|3 C	Start	53,371,087 bp
Band	3|3 C	End	53,389,176 bp
RNA expression pattern
Bgee	Human / Mouse (ortholog); Top expressed in: secondary oocyte; ganglionic eminence; body of pancreas; epithelium of colon; cerebellar hemisphere; skin of abdomen; right hemisphere of cerebellum; skin of leg; placenta; rectum / Top expressed in: otic vesicle; genital tubercle; tail of embryo; Rostral migratory stream; epiblast; primitive streak; ventricular zone; ganglionic eminence; trigeminal ganglion; yolk sac; More reference expression data
BioGPS	n/a
Orthologs
Databases	NCBI: entry; OMA: entry
Species	Human	Mouse
Entrez	80209	212127
Ensembl	ENSG00000120685	ENSMUSG00000049504
UniProt	Q86XN7	Q5PRE5
RefSeq (mRNA)	NM_025138; NM_170719	NM_173382
RefSeq (protein)	NP_079414; NP_733837	NP_775558
Location (UCSC)	Chr 13: 39.01 – 39.04 Mb	Chr 3: 53.37 – 53.39 Mb
PubMed search
- Wikidata
View/Edit Human	View/Edit Mouse

PROSER1 is a protein that in humans is encoded by the PROSER1 gene.

== Nomenclature ==
PROSER1 has several aliases: C13orf23, KIAA2032, and proline and serine-rich protein 1.

=== Location ===
PROSER1 is located on the negative (reverse) strand of chromosome 13 at position 13q13.3. It spans from 39,009,865 base pairs from the pter to 39,038,095 bp from the pter, with a size of 28,231 bases. PROSER1 has a total of 13 exons in its primary unspliced transcript mRNA of 5,185 bp. There are 2 isoforms of PROSER1, both within the 5,000 bp range.

=== Gene neighborhood ===
Genes STOML3 and NHLRC3 neighbor PROSER1 on chromosome 13.

=== Tissue distribution ===
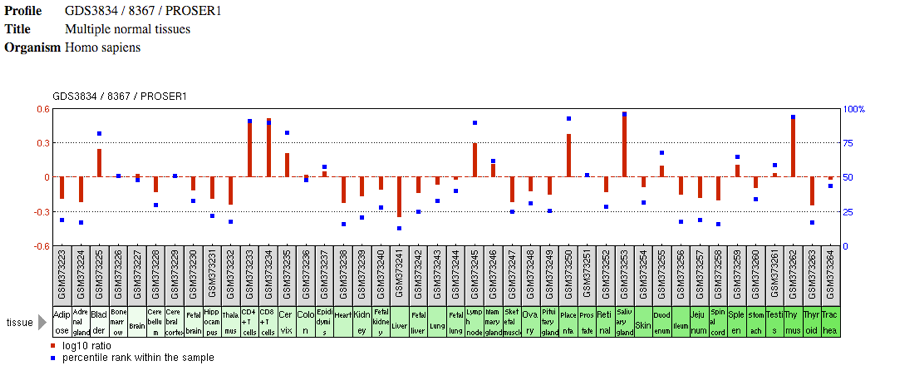
Diagram depicting the level of expression of PROSER1 in various parts of the human body.

Expressed Sequence Tag mapping of PROSER1 expression shows that it has particularly high expression in lymph, embryonic tissue, thymus, and uterus sites. It has moderate expression in testis, larynx, nerve, blood, and adipose tissue sites. According to the Human Protein Atlas, PROSER1 has general cytoplasmic expression and is expressed in all RNA tissue categories.

== Homology ==
=== Paralogs ===
PROSER1 has no paralogs.

=== Orthologs ===
PROSER1 is highly conserved among mammals. It is less highly conserved, though has been found, in fish, birds, and some invertebrates. It is not expressed in bacteria, plants, or fungi. Show below is table of orthologs compiled from NCBI.

Latin name	Common name	Date of divergence (from H. sapiens)	Accession number	Protein sequence length	Sequence identity	Sequence similarity
Homo sapiens	Human	-	NP_079414.3	944 amino acids	-	-
Gorilla gorilla	Gorilla	8.9 million years ago	XP_004054459	994 aa	99%	99%
Colobus angolensis palliatus	Angola colobus	29.1 MYA	XP_011798372	947 aa	97%	97%
Nannospalax galili	Spalax	90.9 MYA	XP_008847583	916 aa	80%	85%
Cricetulus griseus	Chinese Hamster	90.9 MYA	XP_007626898	912 aa	79%	84%
Panthera tigris altaica	Siberian Tiger	97.5 MYA	XP_007097793	665 aa	85%	89%
Acinonyx jubatus	Cheetah	97.5 MYA	XP_014926409	770 aa	79%	83%
Tursiops truncatus	Common Bottlenose Dolphin	97.5 MYA	XP_004332367	1064 aa	77%	83%
Ornithorhynchus anatinus	Platypus	179.2 MYA	XP_007666895	888 aa	69%	74%
Chelonia mydas	Green Sea Turtle	320.5 MYA	XP_007070970	936 aa	75%	83%
Pygoscelis adeliae	Adelie Penguin	320.5 MYA	XP_009318201	938 aa	75%	83%
Calidris (philomachus) pugnax	Ruff	320.5 MYA	XP_014821534	899 aa	74%	83%
Chrysemys picta bellii	Painted Turtle	320.5 MYA	XP_008175998	825 aa	73%	82%
Aquila chrysaetos Canadensis	Golden Deagle	320.5 MYA	XP_011579121	916 aa	73%	81%
Alligator sinensis	Chinese Alligator	320.5 MYA	XP_014376376	940 aa	72%	81%
Gekko japonicus	Japanese Gecko	320.5 MYA	XP_015281837	1053 aa	65%	75%
Python bivittatus	Burmese Python	320.5 MYA	XP_007438154	924 aa	65%	75%
Anolis carolinensis	Carolina Anole	320.5 MYA	XP_008124125	920 aa	64%	75%
Xenopus tropicalis	Western Clawed Frog	355.7 MYA	XP_012813331	944 aa	51%	63%
Lepisosteus oculatus	Spotted Gar	429.6 MYA	XP_015197497	885 aa	47%	58%
Callorhinchus milii	Australian Ghost Shark	482.9 MYA	XP_007889503	965 aa	64%	75%

== Protein ==
=== General properties ===
The translated PROSER1 protein is 944 amino acids long. Its predicted molecular weight is 95.7 kdal. PROSER1 has an isoelectric point of 9. It is predicted to be localized to the nucleus.

=== Composition ===
The sequence is rich in proline and serine and not particularly low in any other amino acids.

=== Domains ===
PROSER1 contains one domain of unknown function, DUF 4476, part of pfam14771. The DUF spans from amino acids 26 to 121. The molecular weight of DUF 4476 is 11.1 kdal.

Detailed location of DUF 4476 on PROSER1.

=== Secondary structure ===
PROSER1 is composed primarily of alpha helices, beta sheets, and coils. The protein is largely coiled. The DUF is composed mainly of alpha helices and coils. It has slightly fewer beta sheets compared to the protein as a whole.
