= FRA3A =

Gene in the species Homo sapiens

Identifiers
- Aliases: FRA3A, fragile site, aphidicolin type, common, fra(3)(p24.2)
- External IDs: GeneCards: FRA3A; OMA:FRA3A - orthologs
Orthologs
Species	Human	Mouse
Entrez	2384	n/a
Ensembl	n/a	n/a
UniProt	n a	n/a
RefSeq (mRNA)	n/a	n/a
RefSeq (protein)	n/a	n/a
Location (UCSC)	n/a	n/a
PubMed search		n/a
- Wikidata
View/Edit Human

Fragile site, aphidicolin type, common, fra(3)(p24.2) is a protein that in humans is encoded by the FRA3A gene.
