= SPG14 =

Genetic element in the species Homo sapiens

Identifiers
- Aliases: SPG14, spastic paraplegia 14 (autosomal recessive)
- External IDs: GeneCards: SPG14; OMA:SPG14 - orthologs
Orthologs
| Species | Human | Mouse |
| Entrez | 57309 | n/a |
| Ensembl | n/a | n/a |
| UniProt | n a | n/a |
| RefSeq (mRNA) | n/a | n/a |
| RefSeq (protein) | n/a | n/a |
| Location (UCSC) | n/a | n/a |
| PubMed search | | n/a |
- Wikidata
| View/Edit Human |

Spastic paraplegia 14 (autosomal recessive) is a protein that in humans is encoded by the SPG14 gene.
