= Hereditary sensory neuropathy, type ib =

Genetic element in the species Homo sapiens

HSN1B

Identifiers
- Aliases: Hereditary sensory neuropathytype IB
- External IDs: GeneCards: ; OMA:- orthologs
Orthologs
Species	Human	Mouse
Entrez	378888	n/a
Ensembl	n/a	n/a
UniProt	n a	n/a
RefSeq (mRNA)	n/a	n/a
RefSeq (protein)	n/a	n/a
Location (UCSC)	n/a	n/a
PubMed search		n/a
- Wikidata
View/Edit Human

Hereditary sensory neuropathy, type IB is a protein that in humans is encoded by the HSN1B gene.
