= Long intergenic non-protein coding RNA 312 =

LINC00312

Identifiers
- Aliases: LINC00312, ERR-10, ERR10, LMCD1DN, LOH3CR2A, NAG-7, NCRNA00312, NAG7, long intergenic non-protein coding RNA 312
- External IDs: OMIM: 610485; GeneCards: LINC00312; OMA:LINC00312 - orthologs
Orthologs
Species	Human	Mouse
Entrez	29931	n/a
Ensembl	n/a	n/a
UniProt	n a	n/a
RefSeq (mRNA)	NM_013343	n/a
RefSeq (protein)	n/a	n/a
Location (UCSC)	n/a	n/a
PubMed search		n/a
- Wikidata
View/Edit Human

Long intergenic non-protein coding RNA 312 is a protein that in humans is encoded by the LINC00312 gene.
