= MicroRNA 425 =

Non-coding RNA in the species Homo sapiens

MicroRNA 425 is a microRNA that in humans is encoded by the MIR425 gene.
