= Daz interacting zinc finger protein 3 =

Protein-coding gene in the species Homo sapiens

DZIP3

Identifiers
- Aliases: DZIP3, PPP1R66, UURF2, hRUL138, DAZ interacting zinc finger protein 3
- External IDs: OMIM: 608672; MGI: 1917433; GeneCards: DZIP3
Enzyme activity
| EC # | BRENDA | ExPASy | KEGG | MetaCyc |
|---|---|---|---|---|
| 2.3.2.27 | ↗ | ↗ | ↗ | ↗ |

Gene location (Mouse)
| Chr. | Chromosome 16 (mouse) |
| Band | 16|16 B5 | Start | 48,744,595 bp |
| Band | 16|16 B5 | End | 48,814,528 bp |
RNA expression pattern
| Bgee | Human / Mouse (ortholog); Top expressed in: bronchial epithelial cell; Brodmann area 23; sperm; Achilles tendon; middle temporal gyrus; right uterine tube; superior frontal gyrus; postcentral gyrus; entorhinal cortex; tibia / Top expressed in: superior cervical ganglion; hand; ventromedial nucleus; Rostral migratory stream; arcuate nucleus; mammillary body; paraventricular nucleus of hypothalamus; lateral hypothalamus; dorsomedial hypothalamic nucleus; lateral septal nucleus; More reference expression data |
| BioGPS | n/a |
Gene ontology
| Molecular function | phosphatase binding; polyubiquitin modification-dependent protein binding; protein binding; metal ion binding; RNA binding; ubiquitin-protein transferase activity; transferase activity; unfolded protein binding; ubiquitin protein ligase activity; ubiquitin-specific protease binding |
| Cellular component | cytoplasm; Hrd1p ubiquitin ligase complex; Derlin-1 retrotranslocation complex; endoplasmic reticulum quality control compartment |
| Biological process | protein polyubiquitination; protein ubiquitination; ubiquitin-dependent ERAD pathway; endoplasmic reticulum unfolded protein response |
Sources:Amigo / QuickGO
Orthologs
| Databases | NCBI: entry |
| Species | Human | Mouse |
| Entrez | 9666 | 224170 |
| Ensembl | n/a | ENSMUSG00000064061 |
| UniProt | Q86Y13 | Q7TPV2 |
| RefSeq (mRNA) | NM_014648 | NM_001110017; NM_027341; NM_001356425 |
| RefSeq (protein) | NP_055463 | NP_001103487; NP_081617; NP_001343354 |
| Location (UCSC) | n/a | Chr 16: 48.74 – 48.81 Mb |
| PubMed search |
- Wikidata
| View/Edit Human | View/Edit Mouse |

E3 ubiquitin-protein ligase DZIP3 is a protein that in humans is encoded by the DZIP3 gene.
