= CDKN2BAS =

Non-coding RNA in humans

CDKN2B-AS1

Identifiers
- Aliases: CDKN2B-AS1, ANRIL, CDKN2B-AS, CDKN2BAS, NCRNA00089, PCAT12, p15AS, CDKN2B antisense RNA 1
- External IDs: OMIM: 613149; GeneCards: CDKN2B-AS1

Gene location (Human)
Chr.	Chromosome 9 (human)
Band	9p21.3	Start	21,994,139 bp
Band	9p21.3	End	22,128,103 bp
RNA expression pattern
Bgee	Human / Mouse (ortholog); Top expressed in: mucosa of transverse colon; rectum; epithelium of colon; testicle; gonad; right uterine tube; anterior pituitary; pancreatic ductal cell; tibialis anterior muscle; sural nerve / n/a; More reference expression data
BioGPS	n/a
Orthologs
Databases	NCBI: entry; OMA: entry
Species	Human	Mouse
Entrez	100048912	n/a
Ensembl	ENSG00000240498	n/a
UniProt	n a	n/a
RefSeq (mRNA)	n/a	n/a
RefSeq (protein)	n/a	n/a
Location (UCSC)	Chr 9: 21.99 – 22.13 Mb	n/a
PubMed search		n/a
- Wikidata
View/Edit Human

CDKN2B antisense RNA 1 intronic convserved region
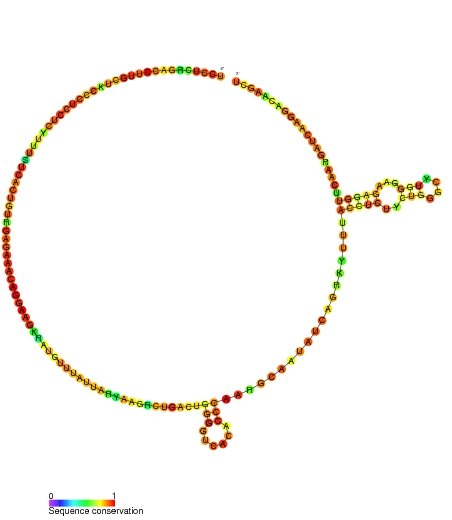
- Predicted secondary structure and sequence conservation of CDKN2B-AS

Identifiers
- Symbol: CDKN2B-AS
- Alt. Symbols: ANRIL
- Rfam: RF01909

Other data
- RNA type: Gene;
- Domain: Eukaryota;
- GO: GO:0006342 GO:0005515
- SO: SO:0001463
- PDB structures: PDBe

CDKN2B and CDKN2A antisense cis and trans regulatory RNA 1, also known as ANRIL (antisense non-coding RNA in the INK4 locus), is a non-coding RNA that in humans is encoded by the gene CDKN2B-AS1 (previously CDKN2BAS). CDKN2B-AS1 consists of 19 exons, spanning 126.3kb in the genome, and its spliced product is a 3834bp RNA. It is located within the p15/CDKN2B-p16/CDKN2A-p14/ARF gene cluster, in the antisense direction. Single nucleotide polymorphisms (SNPs) which alter the expression of CDKN2B-AS are associated with human healthy life expectancy, as well as with multiple diseases, including coronary artery disease, diabetes and many cancers. It binds to chromobox 7 (CBX7) within the polycomb repressive complex 1 and to SUZ12, a component of polycomb repression complex 2 and through these interactions is involved in transcriptional repression.

== See also ==
- Long noncoding RNA
