= KCNQ1OT1 =

Identifiers
- Aliases: KCNQ1OT1, KCNQ1-AS2, KCNQ10T1, KvDMR1, KvLQT1-AS, LIT1, NCRNA00012, Kncq1, KCNQ1 opposite strand/antisense transcript 1 (non-protein coding), KCNQ1 opposite strand/antisense transcript 1
- External IDs: OMIM: 604115; GeneCards: KCNQ1OT1

Gene location (Human)
Chr.	Chromosome 11 (human)
Band	11p15.5	Start	2,608,328 bp
Band	11p15.5	End	2,699,994 bp
RNA expression pattern
Bgee	Human / Mouse (ortholog); Top expressed in: tibia; tendon of biceps brachii; mucosa of paranasal sinus; sperm; germinal epithelium; parietal pleura; internal globus pallidus; visceral pleura; pancreatic ductal cell; testicle / n/a; More reference expression data
BioGPS	n/a
Orthologs
Databases	NCBI: entry; OMA: entry
Species	Human	Mouse
Entrez	10984	n/a
Ensembl	ENSG00000269821	n/a
UniProt	n a	n/a
RefSeq (mRNA)	n/a	n/a
RefSeq (protein)	n/a	n/a
Location (UCSC)	Chr 11: 2.61 – 2.7 Mb	n/a
PubMed search		n/a
- Wikidata
View/Edit Human

KCNQ1 overlapping transcript 1, also known as KCNQ1OT1, is a long non-coding RNA gene found in the KCNQ1 locus. This locus consists of 8–10 protein-coding genes, specifically expressed from the maternal allele (including the KCNQ1 gene), and the paternally expressed non-coding RNA gene KCNQ1OT1. KCNQ1OT1 and KCNQ1 are imprinted genes and are part of an imprinting control region (ICR). Mitsuya identified that KCNQ1OT1 is an antisense transcript of KCNQ1. KCNQ1OT1 is a paternally expressed allele and KCNQ1 is a maternally expressed allele. KCNQ1OT1 is a nuclear, 91 kb transcript, found in close proximity to the nucleolus in certain cell types.

It interacts with chromatin, the histone methyltransferase G9a (responsible for the mono- and dimethylation of histone 3 lysine 9, H3K9), and the Polycomb Repressive Complex 2, PRC2, (responsible for the trimethylation of H3K27). It plays an important role in the transcriptional silencing of the KCNQ1 locus by regulating histone methylation. An 890 bp region at the 5′ end of KCNQ1OT1 acts as a silencing domain. This region regulates CpG methylation levels of somatically acquired differentially methylated regions (DMRs), mediates the interaction of KCNQ1OT1 with chromatin and with DNA (cytosine-5)-methyltransferase 1 (DNMT1), but does not affect the interactions of histone methyltransferases with KCNQ1OT1.

The misregulation of the imprinted gene KCNQ1OT1 can lead to a variety of abnormalities. The loss of the maternal methylation of the KCNQ1OT1 allele is most commonly associated with Beckwith-Wiedemann syndrome. The deletion of KCNQ1OT1 in males can result in a removal of the repressor in six cis genes. Offspring from the males that had KCNQ1OT1 knocked out weighed 20–25% less than the control. If the deletion occurred in females, their offspring had no growth restrictions. Furthermore, uniparental paternal disomy (UPD) of KCNQ1OT1 is strongly associated with Wilms' tumor. In fact, three out of four patients with Beckwith-Wiedemann Syndrome and Wilms' tumor had UPD. When KCNQ1OT1 transcript is truncated, normally repressed alleles on the paternal chromosome are instead expressed. As the evidence shows, the misregulation of KCNQ1OT1 can lead to disastrous physical and genetic effects.

== Clinical significance ==
Rare familial KCNQ1 variants that disrupt transcription through the maternally methylated IC2 (KCNQ1OT1:TSS-DMR) have been reported to cause loss of IC2 methylation, biallelic KCNQ1OT1 expression, and Beckwith-Wiedemann syndrome when maternally transmitted. Paternal transmission of the same variants has instead been reported to present as isolated long QT syndrome without Beckwith-Wiedemann syndrome.

== See also ==
- Long noncoding RNA
- Beckwith-Wiedemann syndrome
