= Antisense RNA =

Single stranded RNA

Antisense RNA (asRNA), also referred to as antisense transcript, natural antisense transcript (NAT) or antisense oligonucleotide, is a single stranded RNA that is complementary to a protein coding messenger RNA (mRNA) with which it hybridizes, and thereby blocks its translation into protein. The asRNAs (which occur naturally) have been found in both prokaryotes and eukaryotes, and can be classified into short (<200 nucleotides) and long (>200 nucleotides) non-coding RNAs (ncRNAs). The primary function of asRNA is regulating gene expression. asRNAs may also be produced synthetically and have found widespread use as research tools for gene knockdown. They may also have therapeutic applications.

== Discovery and history in drug development ==
Some of the earliest asRNAs were discovered while investigating functional proteins. An example was micF asRNA. While characterizing the outer membrane porin ompC in E.coli, some of the ompC promoter clones observed were capable of repressing the expression of other membrane porin such as ompF. The region responsible for this repression function was found to be a 300 base-pair locus upstream of the ompC promoter. This 300 base-pair region shows 70% sequence identity with the 5' end of the ompF mRNA and thus the transcript of this 300 base pair locus was complementary to the ompF mRNA. Later on, this transcript, denoted micF, was found to be an asRNA of ompF and capable of downregulating the expression of ompF under stress by forming a duplex with the ompF mRNA. This induces the degradation of the ompF mRNA.

Unlike micF RNA being discovered by accident, the majority of asRNAs were discovered by genome wide searches for small regulatory RNAs and by transcriptome analysis. Conventionally, the first step involves computational predictions based on some known characteristics of asRNAs. During computational searches, the encoding regions are excluded. The regions that are predicted to have conserved RNA structures and act as orphan promoters and Rho independent terminators are preferenced during analysis. Because computational searches focuses on the intergenic region, the asRNAs that are transcribed from the opposite strand of an encoding gene are likely to be missed using this method. To detect asRNA transcribed from the encoding region, oligonucleotide microarrays can be used. In this method, one or both strands of encoding genes can be used as probes. In addition to computational searches and microarrays, some asRNAs were discovered by sequencing cDNA clones as well as mapping promoter elements. Although many findings from the approaches mentioned above gave rise to a lot of possible asRNAs, only few were proven to be actual asRNAs via further functional tests. To minimize the number of false positive results, new approaches from recent years have been focusing on strand-specific transcription, chromatin binding noncoding RNAs and single cell studies.

The idea of asRNAs as drug targets started in 1978 when Zamecnik and Stephenson found an antisense oligonucleotide to the viral RNA of Rous scarcoma virus that was capable of inhibiting viral replication and protein synthesis. Since then, much effort has been devoted to developing asRNAs as drug candidates. In 1998, the first asRNA drug, fomivirsen, was approved by FDA. Fomivirsen, a 21 base-pair oligonucleotide, was developed to treat cytomegalovirus retinitis in patients with AIDS. It works by targeting the transcribed mRNA of the virus and consequently inhibiting replication of cytomegalovirus. Despite fomivirsen being discontinued in 2004 due to the loss of the market, it served as a successful and inspiring example of using asRNAs as drug targets or drug candidates.

Another example of using an asRNA as a therapeutic agent is mipomersen, which was approved by FDA in 2013. Mipomersen was developed to manage the level of low-density lipoprotein cholesterol (LDL) in patients with homozygous familial hypercholesterolemia (HoFH), which is a rare autosomal dominant genetic condition. Because of the high level of total cholesterol (650–1000 mg/dL) and LDL receptor (above 600 mg/dL) in HoFH, patients with HoFH has a high risk for coronary heart disease. Because the protein apo-B-100 has been found to be required to produce very low-density lipoprotein (VLDL) and LDL, mipomersen complements with the mRNA of apo-B-100 and target it for RNAse H dependent degradation. Ultimately, mipomersen is able to reduce the level of LDL.

== Examples across species ==
The initial asRNAs discovered were in prokaryotes including plasmids, bacteriophage and bacteria. For example, in plasmid ColE1, the asRNA termed RNA I plays an important role in determining the plasmid copy number by controlling replication. The replication of ColE1 relies on the transcription of a primer RNA named RNA II. Once RNA II is transcribed, it hybridizes to its DNA template and later cleaved by RNase H. In the presence of the asRNA RNA I, RNA I and RNA II forms a duplex which introduces a conformational change of RNA II. Consequently, RNA II cannot hybridize with its DNA template which results in a low copy number of ColE1. In bacteriophage P22, the asRNA sar helps regulate between lytic and lysogenic cycle by control the expression of Ant. Besides being expressed in prokaryotes, asRNAs were also discovered in plants. The most well described example of asRNA regulation in plants is on Flowering Locus C (FLC) gene. FLC gene in Arabidopsis thaliana encodes for a transcription factor that prevent expression of a range of genes that induce floral transition. In cold environment, the asRNA of FLC gene, denoted COOLAIR, is expressed and inhibits the expression of FLC via chromatin modification which consequently allows for flowering. Another well studied example is DOG1 (Delay of Germination 1) gene. Its expression level is negatively regulated by the antisense transcript (asDOG1 or 1GOD) acting in cis. In mammalian cells, a typical example of asRNA regulation is X chromosome inactivation. Xist, an asRNA, can recruit polycomb repressive complex 2 (PRC2) which results in heterochromatinization of the X chromosome.

== Classification ==
Antisense RNAs can be classified in different ways. In terms of regulatory mechanisms, some authors group asRNAs into RNA-DNA interactions, RNA-RNA interactions either in nucleus or cytoplasm and RNA-protein interactions (epigenetic). Antisense RNAs can be categorized by the type of the promoters that initiate expression of asRNAs: independent promoters, shared bidirectional promoters or cryptic promoters. In terms of length, although asRNA in general is classified as lncRNAs, there are short asRNAs with length of less than 200 base pairs. Because the regulatory mechanism of asRNAs are found to be species specific, asRNAs can also be classified by species. One of the common ways of classifying asRNAs is by where the asRNAs are transcribe relatively to their target genes: cis-acting and trans-acting.

=== Cis-acting ===
Cis-acting asRNAs are transcribed from the opposite strand of the target gene at the target gene locus. They often show high degree or complete complementarity with the target gene. If the cis-acting asRNA regulates gene expression by targeting mRNA, it can only target individual mRNA. Upon interactions with the targeting mRNAs, cis-acting asRNAs can either block ribosome binding or recruit RNAase to degrade the targeting mRNAs. Consequently, the function of these cis-acting asRNAs is to repress translation of the targeting mRNAs. Besides cis-acting asRNAs that target mRNAs, there are cis-acting epigenetic silencers and activators. Antisense RNA has been shown to repress the translation of LINE1-ORF2 domain of Entamoeba histolytica. However it is not confirmed yet whether its cis-acting or trans.

In terms of epigenetic modification, cis-acting refers to the nature of these asRNAs that regulate epigenetic changes around the loci where they are transcribed. Instead of targeting individual mRNAs, these cis-acting epigenetic regulators can recruit chromatin modifying enzymes which can exert effects on both the transcription loci and the neighboring genes.

=== Trans-acting ===
Trans-acting asRNAs are transcribed from loci that are distal from the targeting genes. In contrast to cis-acting asRNAs, they display low degree of complementarity with the target gene but can be longer than cis-acting asRNAs. They can also target multiple loci. Because of these properties of trans-acting asRNAs, they form less stable complexes with their targeting transcripts and sometimes require aids from RNA chaperone protein such as Hfq to exert their functions. Due to the complexity of the trans-acting asRNAs, they are currently considered to be less druggable targets.

=== Function ===
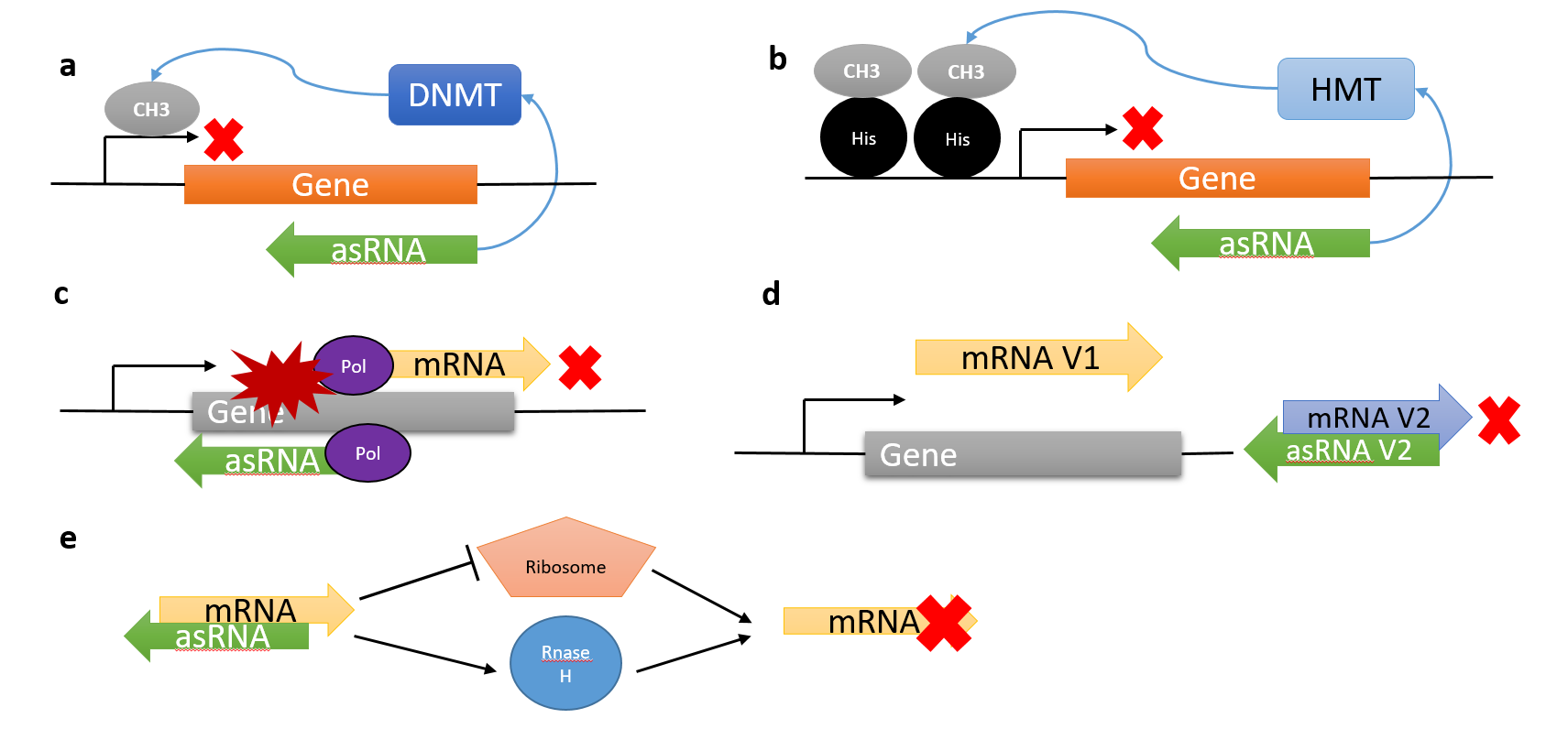
'Epigenetic regulation:' a) AsRNAs can induce DNA methylation by recruiting a DNA methyltransferase (DNMT). b) AsRNAs can induce histone methylation by recruiting of a histone methyltransferase (HMT). 'Co-transcriptional regulation:' c) AsRNAs can cause RNA polymerase (Pol) collision and stop the transcription. d) AsRNAs can preference translation of a specific splice variant (mRNA V1) by blocking the other splice variant (mRNA V2). 'Post-transcriptional regulation:' e) AsRNA-mRNA duplex can either block ribosome from binding to the mRNA or recruit RNase H to degrade the mRNA. By this mechanism, asRNAs directly inhibit translation of the mRNAs.

==== Epigenetic regulation ====
Many examples of asRNAs show the inhibitory effect on transcription initiation via epigenetic modifications.

===== DNA methylation =====
DNA methylation can result in long term downregulation of specific genes. Repression of functional proteins via asRNA induced DNA methylation has been found in several human disease. In a class of alpha-thalassemia, a type of blood disorder that has reduced level of hemoglobin leading to insufficient oxygen in the tissues, hemoglobin alpha1 gene (HBA1) is downregulated by an abnormal transcript of putative RNA-binding protein Luc7-like (LUC71) that serves as an asRNA to HBA1 and induces methylation of HBA1's promoter. Another example is silencing of a tumor suppressor gene p15INK4b, also called CDKN2B, in acute lymphoblastic leukemia and acute myeloid leukemia. The asRNA that is responsible for this silencing effect is antisense non-coding RNA in the INK locus (ANRIL), which is expressed in the same locus that encodes for p15INK4b.

===== Histone modification =====
In eukaryotic cells, DNA is tightly packed by histones. Modification on histones can change interactions with DNA which can further induce changes in gene expression. The biological consequences of histone methylation are context dependent. In general, histone methylation leads to gene repression but gene activation can also be achieved. Evidence has shown histone methylation can be induced by asRNAs. For instance, ANRIL, in addition to the ability to induce DNA methylation, can also repress the neighboring gene of CDKN2B, CDKN2A, by recruiting polycomb repressive complex 2 (PRC2) which leads to histone methylation (H3K27me). Another classic example is X chromosome inactivation by XIST.

ANRIL induced epigenetic modification is an example of cis acting epigenetic regulation. In addition, Antisense RNA-induced chromatin modification can be both trans-acting. For example, in mammals, the asRNA HOTAIR is transcribed from homeobox C (HOXC) locus but it recruits PRC2 to HOXD which deposits H3K27 and silences HOXD. HOTAIR is highly expressed in primary breast tumors.

==== Co-transcriptional regulation ====
Epigenetic regulations such as DNA methylation and histone methylation can repress gene expression by inhibiting initiation of transcription. Sometimes, however, gene repression can be achieved by prematurely terminating or slowing down transcription process. AsRNAs can be involved in this level of gene regulation. For example, in bacterial or eukaryotic cells where complex RNA polymerases are present, bidirectional transcription at the same locus can lead to polymerase collision and results in the termination of transcription. Even when polymerase collision is unlikely during weak transcription, polymerase pausing can also occur which blocks elongation and leads to gene repression. One of the examples is repression of IME4 gene by its asRNA RME2. Another way of affecting transcription co-transcriptionally is by blocking splicing. One classic example in human is zinc-finger E-box binding homeobox 2 gene (ZEB2) which encodes E-cadherin, a transcriptional repressor. Efficient translation of ZEB2 mRNA requires the presence of an internal ribosome entry site (IRES) in intron of the mRNA at the 5' end. With the asRNA of ZEB2 being expressed, it can mask the splicing site and maintain the IRES in the mRNA which results in an efficient synthesis of E-cadherin. Lastly, depending on the level of asRNA expression, different isoforms of the sense transcript can be produced. Therefore, asRNA dependent regulation is not limited to on/off mechanism; rather, it presents a fine tone control system.

==== Post-transcriptional regulation ====
The direct post transcriptional modulation by asRNAs refers to mRNAs being targeted by asRNAs directly; thus, the translation is affected. Some characteristics of this type of asRNAs are described in the cis- and trans- acting asRNAs. This mechanism is relatively fast because both the targeting mRNA and its asRNA need to be present simultaneously in the same cell. As described in the cis-acting asRNAs, the mRNA-asRNA pairing can result in blockage of ribosome entry and RNase H dependent degradation. Overall, mRNA-targeting asRNAs can either activate or inhibit translation of the sense mRNAs with inhibitory effect being the most abundant.

=== Therapeutic potential ===
As a regulatory element, asRNAs bear many advantages to be considered as a drug target. First of all, asRNAs regulate gene expression at multiple levels including transcription, post-transcription and epigenetic modification. Secondly, the cis-acting asRNAs are sequence specific and exhibits high degree of complementarity with the targeting genes. Thirdly, the expression level of asRNAs is very small compared to that of the targeting mRNAs; therefore, only small amount of asRNAs is required to produce an effect. In terms of drug targets, this represents a huge advantage because only a low dosage is required for effectiveness.

Recent years the idea of targeting asRNAs to increase gene expression in a locus specific manner has been drawing much attention. Due to the nature of drug development, it is always easier to have drugs functioning as downregulators or inhibitors. However, there is a need in developing drugs that can activate or upregulate gene expression such as tumor suppressor genes, neuroprotective growth factors and genes that are found silenced in certain Mendelian disorders. Currently, the approach to restore deficient gene expression or protein function include enzyme replacement therapies, microRNA therapies and delivery of functional cDNA. However, each bears some drawbacks. For example, the synthesized protein used in the enzyme replacement therapies often cannot mimic the whole function of the endogenous protein. In addition, enzyme replacement therapies are life-long commitment and carry a large financial burden for the patient. Because of the locus specific nature of asRNAs and evidences of changes in asRNA expression in many diseases, there have been attempts to design single stranded oligonucleotides, referred as antagoNATs, to inhibit asRNAs and ultimately to increase specific gene expression.

Despite the promises of asRNAs as drug targets or drug candidates, there are some challenges remained to be addressed. First of all, asRNAs and antagoNATs can be easily degraded by RNase or other degrading enzymes. To prevent degradation of the therapeutic oliogoneucleotides, chemical modification is usually required. The most common chemical modification on the oligonucleotides is adding a phosphorothioate linkage to the backbones. However, the phosphrothioate modification can be proinflammatory. Adverse effects including fever, chills or nausea have been observed after local injection of phosphrothioate modified oligonucleotides. Secondly, off target toxicity also represents a big problem. Despite the locus-specific nature of the endogenous asRNAs, only 10–50% synthesized oligonucleotides showed expected targeting effect. One possible reason for this problem is the high requirement on the structure of the asRNAs to be recognized by the target sequence and RNase H. A single mismatch can result in distortion in the secondary structure and lead to off target effects. Lastly, artificial asRNAs have been shown to have limited intracellular uptake. Although neurons and glia have been shown to have the ability to freely uptake naked antisense oligonucleotides, a traceable carriers such as virus and lipid vesicles would still be ideal to control and monitor the intracellular concentration and metabolism.

== See also ==
- Cis-natural antisense transcript
