= HTT-AS1 =

HTT-AS

Identifiers
- Aliases: HTT-AS, HTT-AS1, HTT antisense RNA (head to head), HTT antisense RNA
- External IDs: GeneCards: HTT-AS
Orthologs
Databases	NCBI: entry; OMA: entry
Species	Human	Mouse
Entrez	100750326	n/a
Ensembl	ENSG00000251075	n/a
UniProt	n a	n/a
RefSeq (mRNA)	n/a	n/a
RefSeq (protein)	n/a	n/a
Location (UCSC)	n/a	n/a
PubMed search		n/a
- Wikidata
View/Edit Human

HTT antisense RNA 1 is a non-coding RNA that in humans is encoded by the gene HTT-AS1. It is a long non-coding RNA and antisense RNA which regulates the expression of the huntingtin gene.

== See also ==
- Long noncoding RNA
