= Six3OS1 =

Long non-coding RNA

In molecular biology, Six3OS1 is a long non-coding RNA. It was originally identified in the murine embryonic and postnatal retina. It is located in the distal promoter region of the gene encoding Six3, a homeodomain transcription factor. It regulates the activity of Six3 in the developing mouse retina, by binding to transcriptional co-regulators of Six3 and to histone modification enzymes and acting as a transcriptional scaffold.
