= SMAD5-AS1 =

Identifiers
- Aliases: SMAD5-AS1, DAMS, SMAD5AS, SMAD5OS, SMAD5 antisense RNA 1
- External IDs: GeneCards: SMAD5-AS1

Gene location (Human)
Chr.	Chromosome 5 (human)
Band	5q31.1	Start	136,129,507 bp
Band	5q31.1	End	136,134,890 bp
RNA expression pattern
Bgee	Human / Mouse (ortholog); Top expressed in: skin of thigh; skin of abdomen; skin of hip; ventricular zone; tibialis anterior muscle; ganglionic eminence; Achilles tendon; vulva; muscle of thigh; liver / n/a; More reference expression data
BioGPS	n/a
Orthologs
Databases	NCBI: entry; OMA: entry
Species	Human	Mouse
Entrez	9597	n/a
Ensembl	ENSG00000164621	n/a
UniProt	n a	n/a
RefSeq (mRNA)	NM_022001	n/a
RefSeq (protein)	n/a	n/a
Location (UCSC)	Chr 5: 136.13 – 136.13 Mb	n/a
PubMed search		n/a
- Wikidata
View/Edit Human

In molecular biology, SMAD5 antisense RNA 1 (non-protein coding), also known as SMAD5-AS1 or DAMS, is a long non-coding RNA. It is antisense to, and nested within, the SMAD5 gene. In humans it is found on chromosome 5. In humans, expression of this RNA is detected in foetal heart, foetal adrenal glands and in pancreatic tumours. It may play a role in regulation of SMAD5.

== See also ==
- Long noncoding RNA
