= Cancer susceptibility 21 =

Non-coding RNA in the species Homo sapiens

CASC21

Identifiers
- Aliases: CASC21, CARLo-2, LINC01244, cancer susceptibility candidate 21 (non-protein coding), cancer susceptibility 21 (non-protein coding), CARLO2, cancer susceptibility 21
- External IDs: OMIM: 617702; GeneCards: CASC21; OMA:CASC21 - orthologs
Orthologs
Species	Human	Mouse
Entrez	103021164	n/a
Ensembl	ENSG00000253929	n/a
UniProt	n a	n/a
RefSeq (mRNA)	n/a	n/a
RefSeq (protein)	n/a	n/a
Location (UCSC)	n/a	n/a
PubMed search		n/a
- Wikidata
View/Edit Human

Cancer susceptibility 21 (CASC21), is a long non-coding RNA (lncRNA) that in humans is encoded by the CASC21 gene.
