= Adaptive response 33 =

Long non-coding RNA

In molecular biology, Adaptive response 33 (adapt33) is a long non-coding RNA. It was originally identified in hamster fibroblast cells. Its expression is induced by oxidative stress.

== See also ==
- Long noncoding RNA
