= TUG1 =

Non-coding RNA in the species Homo sapiens

Identifiers
- Aliases: TUG1, LINC00080, NCRNA00080, TI-227H, taurine up-regulated 1 (non-protein coding)
- External IDs: OMIM: 614971; GeneCards: TUG1; OMA:TUG1 - orthologs
Orthologs
Species	Human	Mouse
Entrez	55000	n/a
Ensembl	ENSG00000253352	n/a
UniProt	n a	n/a
RefSeq (mRNA)	n/a	n/a
RefSeq (protein)	n/a	n/a
Location (UCSC)	n/a	n/a
PubMed search		n/a
- Wikidata
View/Edit Human

TUG1 (taurine upregulated gene 1) is a long non-coding RNA expressed in the retina and in the brain. It was first identified in a screen for genes upregulated by in developing retinal cells in response to taurine. It is required for the normal development of photoreceptors in the retina.

== See also ==
- Long noncoding RNA
