= Vax2os1 =

In molecular biology, Vax2os1 is a long non-coding RNA. It is found on the opposite strand of the chromosome to the gene encoding the Vax2 homeobox transcription factor. In mice it is expressed in the developing ventral retina, where it is involved in the control of cell cycle progression of photoreceptor progenitor cells.

== See also ==
- Long noncoding RNA
