= LncRNA p53 regulated and ESC associated 1 =

Non-coding RNA in the species Homo sapiens

LNCPRESS1

Identifiers
- Aliases: LNCPRESS1, lncRNA p53 regulated and ESC associated 1
- External IDs: GeneCards: LNCPRESS1

Gene location (Human)
Chr.	Chromosome 7 (human)
Band	7q22.1	Start	101,299,558 bp
Band	7q22.1	End	101,301,346 bp
RNA expression pattern
Bgee	Human / Mouse (ortholog); Top expressed in: adrenal gland; blood; monocyte; liver; prefrontal cortex; endometrium; subdivision of respiratory system; renal cortex; right lobe of liver; left ventricle / n/a; More reference expression data
BioGPS	n/a
Orthologs
Databases	NCBI: entry; OMA: entry
Species	Human	Mouse
Entrez	101927721	n/a
Ensembl	ENSG00000232301	n/a
UniProt	n a	n/a
RefSeq (mRNA)	n/a	n/a
RefSeq (protein)	n/a	n/a
Location (UCSC)	Chr 7: 101.3 – 101.3 Mb	n/a
PubMed search		n/a
- Wikidata
View/Edit Human

LncRNA p53 regulated and ESC associated 1 is a non-coding RNA that in humans is encoded by the LNCPRESS1 gene.
