= MIMT1 =

Non-coding RNA

Identifiers
- Aliases: MIMT1, LINC00067, MIM1, NCRNA00067, MER1 repeat containing imprinted transcript 1 (non-protein coding), MER1 repeat containing imprinted transcript 1
- External IDs: GeneCards: MIMT1

Gene location (Human)
| Chr. | Chromosome 19 (human) |
| Band | 19q13.43 | Start | 56,840,866 bp |
| Band | 19q13.43 | End | 56,848,556 bp |
RNA expression pattern
| Bgee | Human / Mouse (ortholog); Top expressed in: testicle; ventricular zone; ganglionic eminence; right testis; prefrontal cortex; superior frontal gyrus; left testis; primary visual cortex; placenta; nucleus accumbens / n/a; More reference expression data |
| BioGPS | n/a |
Orthologs
| Databases | NCBI: entry; OMA: entry |
| Species | Human | Mouse |
| Entrez | 100073347 | n/a |
| Ensembl | ENSG00000268654 | n/a |
| UniProt | n a | n/a |
| RefSeq (mRNA) | n/a | n/a |
| RefSeq (protein) | n/a | n/a |
| Location (UCSC) | Chr 19: 56.84 – 56.85 Mb | n/a |
| PubMed search | | n/a |
- Wikidata
| View/Edit Human |

In molecular biology, MER1 repeat containing imprinted transcript 1 (non-protein coding), also known as MIMT1, is a long non-coding RNA. It is an imprinted gene, which is paternally expressed. Deletion of this gene is lethal in cattle, causing still births and abortions. It is lethal in 85% of individuals with the deletion, it is thought that incomplete silencing of maternally imprinted alleles allows some individuals with the deletion to survive.

== See also ==
- Long noncoding RNA
