= GHRLOS =

Identifiers
- Aliases: GHRLOS, GHRL-AS1, GHRLAS, NCRNA00068, ghrelin opposite strand/antisense RNA
- External IDs: OMIM: 618445; GeneCards: GHRLOS

Gene location (Human)
| Chr. | Chromosome 3 (human) |
| Band | 3p25.3 | Start | 10,285,754 bp |
| Band | 3p25.3 | End | 10,294,903 bp |
RNA expression pattern
| Bgee | Human / Mouse (ortholog); Top expressed in: testicle; bone marrow cell; tendon of biceps brachii; pancreatic ductal cell; sural nerve; granulocyte; body of stomach; monocyte; apex of heart; blood / n/a; More reference expression data |
| BioGPS | n/a |
Orthologs
| Databases | NCBI: entry; OMA: entry |
| Species | Human | Mouse |
| Entrez | 100126793 | n/a |
| Ensembl | ENSG00000240288 | n/a |
| UniProt | n a | n/a |
| RefSeq (mRNA) | n/a | n/a |
| RefSeq (protein) | n/a | n/a |
| Location (UCSC) | Chr 3: 10.29 – 10.29 Mb | n/a |
| PubMed search | | n/a |
- Wikidata
| View/Edit Human |

In molecular biology, ghrelin opposite strand (non-protein coding), also known as GHRLOS, is a long non-coding RNA. It is antisense to the GHRL gene, which encodes ghrelin. In humans, it is located on chromosome 3p25. It is alternatively spliced into multiple isoforms.

== See also ==
- Long noncoding RNA
