= SOX2OT =

SOX2-OT

Identifiers
- Aliases: SOX2-OT, NCRNA00043, SOX2 overlapping transcript
- External IDs: OMIM: 616338; GeneCards: SOX2-OT; OMA:SOX2-OT - orthologs

Gene location (Human)
| Chr. | Chromosome 3 (human) |
| Band | 3q26.33 | Start | 180,989,762 bp |
| Band | 3q26.33 | End | 181,836,880 bp |
RNA expression pattern
| Bgee | Human / Mouse (ortholog); Top expressed in: corpus callosum; subthalamic nucleus; inferior ganglion of vagus nerve; external globus pallidus; pars reticulata; C1 segment; Medulla Oblongata; Pons; superior vestibular nucleus; pars compacta / n/a; More reference expression data |
| BioGPS | n/a |
Orthologs
| Species | Human | Mouse |
| Entrez | 347689 | n/a |
| Ensembl | ENSG00000242808 | n/a |
| UniProt | n a | n/a |
| RefSeq (mRNA) | n/a | n/a |
| RefSeq (protein) | n/a | n/a |
| Location (UCSC) | Chr 3: 180.99 – 181.84 Mb | n/a |
| PubMed search | | n/a |
- Wikidata
| View/Edit Human |

SOX2 overlapping transcript (SOX2OT) is a long non-coding RNA, containing at least 5 exons. The SOX2 gene, an important regulator of neurogenesis, lies within one of the introns of SOX2OT. SOX2OT and SOX2DOT (an isoform of SOXOT transcribed from a distal highly conserved element) are expressed in zones of neurogenesis within the brain. It is associated with central nervous system structures in zebrafish and chicken embryonic brains, and is dynamically regulated during embryogenesis. SOX2OT may play a role in vertebrate development.

== See also ==
- Long noncoding RNA
