= TP53TG1 =

Long non-coding RNA

Identifiers
- Aliases: TP53TG1, LINC00096, NCRNA00096, P53TG1, P53TG1-D, TP53AP1, TP53 target 1 (non-protein coding), TP53 target 1
- External IDs: OMIM: 616403; GeneCards: TP53TG1

Gene location (Human)
Chr.	Chromosome 7 (human)
Band	7q21.12	Start	87,322,943 bp
Band	7q21.12	End	87,345,552 bp
RNA expression pattern
Bgee	Human / Mouse (ortholog); Top expressed in: mucosa of transverse colon; olfactory zone of nasal mucosa; right lobe of liver; right uterine tube; muscle of thigh; right adrenal gland; right adrenal cortex; skin of abdomen; C1 segment; epithelium of bronchus / n/a; More reference expression data
BioGPS	n/a
Orthologs
Databases	NCBI: entry; OMA: entry
Species	Human	Mouse
Entrez	11257	n/a
Ensembl	ENSG00000182165	n/a
UniProt	n a	n/a
RefSeq (mRNA)	NM_007233	n/a
RefSeq (protein)	n/a	n/a
Location (UCSC)	Chr 7: 87.32 – 87.35 Mb	n/a
PubMed search		n/a
- Wikidata
View/Edit Human

In molecular biology, TP53 target 1 (non-protein coding), also known as TP53TG1, is a long non-coding RNA. Its expression is induced by p53 under conditions of cellular stress.

== See also ==
- Long noncoding RNA
