= PCGEM1 =

Identifiers
- Aliases: PCGEM1, LINC00071, NCRNA00071, PCAT9, prostate-specific transcript (non-protein coding), prostate-specific transcript, PCGEM1 prostate-specific transcript
- External IDs: OMIM: 605443; GeneCards: PCGEM1

Gene location (Human)
| Chr. | Chromosome 2 (human) |
| Band | 2q32.3 | Start | 192,749,845 bp |
| Band | 2q32.3 | End | 192,776,899 bp |
RNA expression pattern
| Bgee | Human / Mouse (ortholog); Top expressed in: ganglionic eminence; prostate; epithelium of colon; prefrontal cortex; monocyte; reproductive organ; amygdala; islet of Langerhans; olfactory zone of nasal mucosa; primary visual cortex / n/a; More reference expression data |
| BioGPS | n/a |
Orthologs
| Databases | NCBI: entry; OMA: entry |
| Species | Human | Mouse |
| Entrez | 64002 | n/a |
| Ensembl | ENSG00000227418 | n/a |
| UniProt | n a | n/a |
| RefSeq (mRNA) | n/a | n/a |
| RefSeq (protein) | n/a | n/a |
| Location (UCSC) | Chr 2: 192.75 – 192.78 Mb | n/a |
| PubMed search | | n/a |
- Wikidata
| View/Edit Human |

Prostate-specific transcript 1
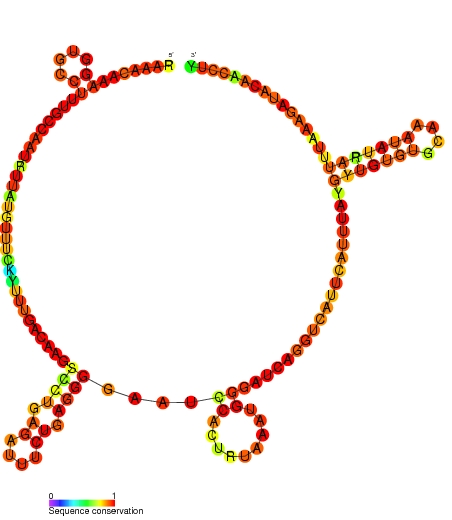
- Predicted secondary structure and sequence conservation of PCGEM1

Identifiers
- Symbol: PCGEM1
- Rfam: RF01981

Other data
- RNA type: Gene;
- Domain: Eukaryota;
- GO: GO:0042981
- SO: SO:0001463
- PDB structures: PDBe

Prostate-specific transcript 1 (non-protein coding), also known as PCGEM1, is a long non-coding RNA gene. In humans, it is located on chromosome 2q32. It is over-expressed in prostate cancer. In a study of prostate tumours from 88 men, levels of PCGEM1 were found to be higher in prostate cancer cells in African-American men than in Caucasian-American men. The mortality rate of prostate cancer is highest in African-American men.

PCGEM1 inhibits doxorubicin-induced apoptosis of cells, via delayed induction of p53 and p21.

== See also ==
- Long noncoding RNA
- Prostate cancer
