= UCA1 =

Non-coding RNA in the species Homo sapiens

Identifiers
- Aliases: UCA1, CUDR, LINC00178, NCRNA00178, UCAT1, onco-lncRNA-36, urothelial cancer associated 1 (non-protein coding), urothelial cancer associated 1, UCA1 RNA, human
- External IDs: OMIM: 617500; GeneCards: UCA1

Gene location (Human)
Chr.	Chromosome 19 (human)
Band	19p13.12	Start	15,828,206 bp
Band	19p13.12	End	15,836,328 bp
RNA expression pattern
Bgee	Human / Mouse (ortholog); Top expressed in: endometrium; testicle; gallbladder; islet of Langerhans; placenta; urinary bladder; epithelium of colon; gonad; rectum; bone marrow / n/a; More reference expression data
BioGPS	n/a
Orthologs
Databases	NCBI: entry; OMA: entry
Species	Human	Mouse
Entrez	652995	n/a
Ensembl	ENSG00000214049	n/a
UniProt	n a	n/a
RefSeq (mRNA)	n/a	n/a
RefSeq (protein)	n/a	n/a
Location (UCSC)	Chr 19: 15.83 – 15.84 Mb	n/a
PubMed search		n/a
- Wikidata
View/Edit Human

In molecular biology, Urothelial cancer associated 1 (non-protein coding), also known as UCA1, is a long non-coding RNA, it is upregulated in bladder cancer. It is believed to function in regulation of embryonic development and in bladder cancer invasion and progression. It regulates the expression of several genes involved in tumourgenesis and/or embryonic development.

== See also ==
- Long noncoding RNA
