= TP73-AS1 =

Identifiers
- Aliases: TP73-AS1, KIAA0495, PDAM, TP73 antisense RNA 1
- External IDs: GeneCards: TP73-AS1

Gene location (Human)
Chr.	Chromosome 1 (human)
Band	1p36.32	Start	3,735,511 bp
Band	1p36.32	End	3,747,373 bp
RNA expression pattern
Bgee	Human / Mouse (ortholog); Top expressed in: left ovary; right ovary; body of uterus; saphenous vein; right hemisphere of cerebellum; left uterine tube; apex of heart; muscle layer of sigmoid colon; pancreatic ductal cell; popliteal artery / n/a; More reference expression data
BioGPS	n/a
Orthologs
Databases	NCBI: entry; OMA: entry
Species	Human	Mouse
Entrez	57212	n/a
Ensembl	ENSG00000227372	n/a
UniProt	n a	n/a
RefSeq (mRNA)	NM_207306	n/a
RefSeq (protein)	n/a	n/a
Location (UCSC)	Chr 1: 3.74 – 3.75 Mb	n/a
PubMed search		n/a
- Wikidata
View/Edit Human

In molecular biology, P73 antisense RNA 1T (non-protein coding), also known as TP73-AS1 or PDAM, is a long non-coding RNA. It may regulate apoptosis via regulation of p53-dependent anti-apoptotic genes. It may play a role in the development of oligodendroglial tumours.
