= NPPA-AS1 =

Long non-coding RNA

Identifiers
- Aliases: NPPA-AS1, NPPA-AS, NPPAAS, NPPA antisense RNA 1
- External IDs: GeneCards: NPPA-AS1
Orthologs
Databases	NCBI: entry; OMA: entry
Species	Human	Mouse
Entrez	100379251	n/a
Ensembl	ENSG00000242349	n/a
UniProt	n a	n/a
RefSeq (mRNA)	n/a	n/a
RefSeq (protein)	n/a	n/a
Location (UCSC)	n/a	n/a
PubMed search		n/a
- Wikidata
View/Edit Human

In molecular biology, NPPA antisense RNA 1 (non-protein coding), also known as NPPA-AS1, is a long non-coding RNA. It is an antisense transcript of the NPPA gene, which encodes the precursor of cardiodilatin-related peptide and atrial natriuretic factor. NPPA-AS1 is alternatively spliced. At least one isoform of NPPA-AS1 can regulate the expression of spliced and unspliced variants of NPPA, possibly by the formation of duplexes with NPPA mRNA.

== See also ==
- Long noncoding RNA
