= LncRNAdb =

lncRNAdb

Content
- Description: Long non-coding RNAs.

Contact
- Research center: The University of Queensland, Brisbane
- Authors: Paulo P Amaral
- Primary citation: Amaral & al. (2011)
- Release date: 2010

Access
- Website: www.lncrnadb.org

In bioinformatics, lncRNAdb is a biological database of Long non-coding RNAs The database focuses on those RNAs which have been experimentally characterised with a biological function. The database currently holds over 290 lncRNAs from around 60 species. Example lncRNAs in the database are HOTAIR and Xist.
