= List of long non-coding RNA databases =

This is a list of long noncoding RNA databases, which provide information about lncRNAs.

== Long non-coding RNA databases ==
Name	Description	References
deepBase	Identification, expression, evolution and function of long non-coding RNAs (LncRNAs), small RNAs and circular RNAs from deep-sequencing data	
LNCipedia	A comprehensive compendium of human long non-coding RNAs.	
lncRNAdb	The Reference Database For Functional Long Noncoding RNAs.	
LncRNAWiki	A wiki-based, publicly editable and open-content platform for community curation of human long non-coding RNAs (lncRNAs)	
LncBook	A comprehensive collection of 270,044 human lncRNAs and systematic curation of lncRNAs’ annotation by multi-omics data integration, function annotation and disease association	
MONOCLdb	The MOuse NOnCode Lung database provides the annotations and expression profiles of mouse long non-coding RNAs (lncRNAs) involved in influenza and SARS-CoV infections.	
NONCODE	An integrated knowledge database dedicated to ncRNAs, especially lncRNAs	
lncRNome	A comprehensive searchable biologically oriented knowledgebase for long noncoding RNAs in Humans.	
NRED	A database of long noncoding RNA expression.	
C-It-Loci	A tool to explore and to compare the expression profiles of conserved loci among various tissues in three organisms	
MiTranscriptome	A catalog of human long poly-adenylated RNA transcripts derived from computational analysis of high-throughput RNA-Seq data from over 6,500 samples, spanning diverse cancer and tissue types	
slncky Evolution Browser	This site contains alignments and evolutionary metrics of conserved lncRNAs.	
Cancer LncRNA Census (CLC)	Database of long-noncoding RNAs causally implicated in cancer through in vivo, in vitro and other evidence.	
BIGTranscriptome	High-confidence of coding and noncoding transcriptomes assembled with hundreds of pseudo-stranded and stranded RNA-seq datasets.	
lncRNAKB	A knowledgebase of tissue-specific functional annotation and trait association of long noncoding RNA	
lncHUB2	Functional predictions of human and mouse long non-coding RNAs based on lncRNA-gene co-expression correlations.	
