= VIS1 =

Gene in the species Homo sapiens

Identifiers
- Aliases: VIS1, HIS-1, HIS1, viral integration site 1
- External IDs: OMIM: 164755; GeneCards: VIS1; OMA:VIS1 - orthologs
Orthologs
Species	Human	Mouse
Entrez	7435	n/a
Ensembl	ENSG00000276706	n/a
UniProt	n a	n/a
RefSeq (mRNA)	n/a	n/a
RefSeq (protein)	n/a	n/a
Location (UCSC)	n/a	n/a
PubMed search		n/a
- Wikidata
View/Edit Human

VIS1 (viral integration site 1), also known as HIS-1, is a long non-coding RNA. It was originally identified in mice in a screen for genes involved in the development of myeloid leukemia. In murine myeloid leukemias, this gene is a common site of viral insertion by the murine ecotropic retrovirus CasBrM It is conserved amongst vertebrates, including human, mice, cats, pigs, cattle and dogs. Expression of VIS1 is restricted to epithelial cells, leukemias and carcinomas.

== See also ==
- Long noncoding RNA
