= Noncoding RNA activated by DNA damage =

Type of long noncoding RNA

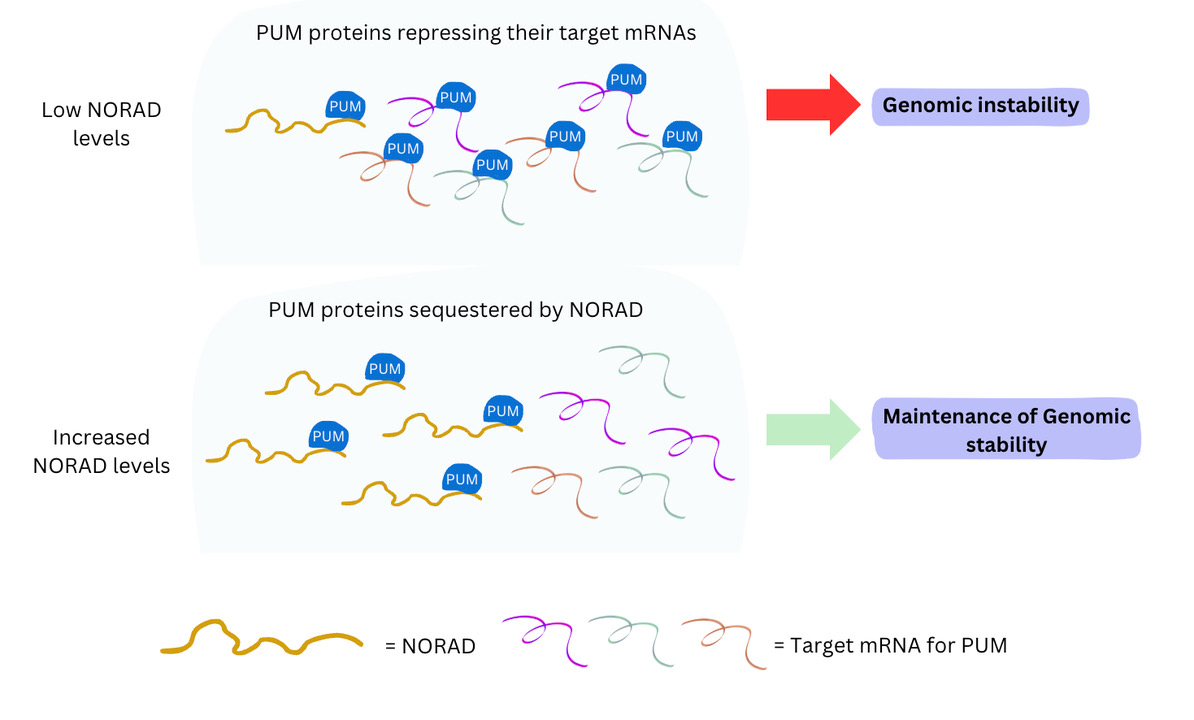
How NORAD works with PUM proteins to contribute to genomic instability.

Noncoding RNA Activated by DNA Damage (NORAD) is a long non-coding RNA (lncRNA) that responds to DNA damage and plays a significant role in preserving stability (keeping it accurate and unchanged) of genetic information (genome) within cells. Upon DNA damage, the amount of NORAD increases within cells and work to prevent proteins responsible for stabilizing genomes (PUMILIO proteins) such as PUM1 and PUM2 from reaching their mRNA targets and destabilizing them. By sequestering the PUMILIO proteins, NORAD allows the involved mRNA (pieces of genetic information derived from DNA that act as protein-coding messengers), to exert their function and maintain many cellular processes. These functions include the repair of the DNA itself, the control of cell division, and the proper segregation of chromosomes, which are tightly bundled forms of DNA. Lack of enough NORAD can cause aneuploidy as a possible result, which is an improper segregation of chromosomes that can be extremely harmful in proper cell division and in the creation of healthy gametes like sperm and egg cells.

== Relevance in cancer ==
Cancer refers to a large number of diseases where irregular cell growth occurs, characterized by cells dividing uncontrollably. It has the ability to spread beyond the place it started to invade multiple parts of the body. Recent studies suggest that NORAD may be involved in the progression of certain cancer cells by increasing the amount of activity in genes that have the potential to cause uncontrollable cell growth (oncogenes), and decreasing the amount of genes that protect the genome (tumor suppressors). This dysregulation was found in cancers such as pancreatic cancer, stomach cancer, breast cancer and more. NORAD affects processes involved in the transformation of healthy cells into cancer cells including cell death (apoptosis), cell growth and divisions (cell proliferation), the spread of cancer cells to healthy cells (metastasis), and a cell's ability to gain migratory characteristics (epithelial-mesenchymal transition (EMT)).

=== Gastrointestinal cancer ===
Gastrointestinal cancer includes all cancers that involve the organs and accessory organs of the digestive system. NORAD levels have been observed to be elevated in various gastrointestinal cancers including pancreatic and colorectal cancer. Increased NORAD is believed to be in response to the low oxygen levels seen in the environment of these cancer cells. This environment allows cancer cells to become more invasive and resistant to treatment. Research has indicated that NORAD works against miRNAs to spread cancer. Specifically, miRNAs are short RNAs that bind to their target mRNAs and lead to their degradation or inability to produce encoded proteins. Some miRNAs work to prevent cancer however, NORAD competes against these miRNAs, allowing cancer to spread more efficiently. In this process, NORAD acts as a competing endogenous RNA (ceRNA). For example, in pancreatic cancer, NORAD helps cancer cells gain the ability to migrate by preventing miRNA from inhibiting a protein that drives EMT.

== Other relevant conditions ==
=== Rheumatoid arthritis ===
NORAD levels are seen to be elevated in the fluid component of blood (serum) of patients suffering from Rheumatoid arthritis (RA), an autoimmune disorder that causes deformities in the joints. These elevated NORAD levels are positively correlated to other inflammatory markers such as C-reactive protein (CRP), rheumatoid factor (RF), and erythrocyte sedimentation rate (ESR). Ultimately, this would allow the possibility of using NORAD levels to help in the future early diagnosis of RA.

=== Premature aging ===
Premature aging symptoms have been attributed to the loss of NORAD as it leads to increased activity of the PUMILIO proteins, resulting in the repression of genes needed for cell division and mitochondrial health, the main energy-supplying compartment of cells. This was seen in mice who were missing NORAD through visible aging signs such as hair loss (alopecia), grey fur, and abnormal caving-in of the spine (kyphosis) by 12 months old. Other aging markers were seen on a cellular level, such as mitochondrial dysfunction and chromosomal instability.
