= DLX6-AS1 =

Non-coding RNA

Evf-2
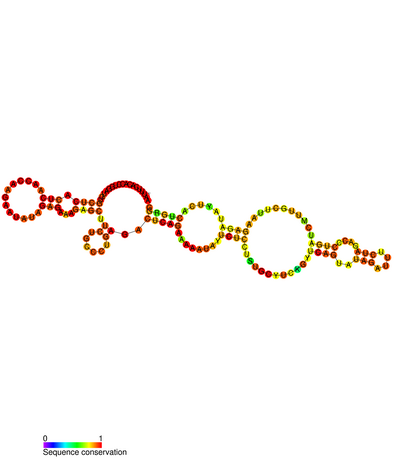
- Conserved secondary structure of Evf2 (an alternatively-spliced Evf1) RNA.

Identifiers
- Symbol: Evf-2
- Rfam: RF01887

Other data
- RNA type: RNA gene
- Domain: Mammalia
- PDB structures: PDBe

DLX6 antisense RNA 1 (DLX6-AS1) (Evf-1 (Embryonic ventral forebrain-1)) is a developmentally-regulated long non-coding RNA. In rats, it is expressed in neurons in the subventricular zone of the developing forebrain. Its expression is linked to that of the Shh (sonic hedgehog) and DLX families of genes, which are important in ventral forebrain and craniofacial development. An alternatively spliced form of DLX6-AS1, DLX6-AS2, forms a stable complex with the Dlx-2 protein. This complex activates transcription of Dlx-5 and Dlx-6.

DLX6-AS2 regulates gene expression in a region of the brain which produces GABAergic interneurons during development. It is involved in the signaling pathway and works in conjunction with DLX homeodomain proteins to increase the effectiveness of the Dlx5/6 enhancer element within neural stem cells. The interneurons are found in the hippocampus of the adult brain, an area responsible for learning and memory.

GABAergic interneurons have been implicated in a number of psychiatric disorders including autism, schizophrenia and epilepsy; as DLX6-AS2 controls the development of these neurons, it has been subject to studies regarding the causation of these disorders.

DLX6-AS2 is the first known long non-coding RNA to be involved in organogenesis.

== See also ==
- Long noncoding RNA
- Dlx (gene)
- Gamma-Aminobutyric acid
- Chemoaffinity hypothesis
