= HOTAIR =

Gene found in humans

Identifiers
- Aliases: HOTAIR, HOXAS, HOXC-AS4, HOXC11-AS1, NCRNA00072, HOX transcript antisense RNA, HOTAIR long untranslated RNA, human
- External IDs: OMIM: 611400; GeneCards: HOTAIR

Gene location (Human)
Chr.	Chromosome 12 (human)
Band	12q13.13	Start	53,962,308 bp
Band	12q13.13	End	53,974,956 bp
RNA expression pattern
Bgee	Human / Mouse (ortholog); Top expressed in: testicle; Achilles tendon; popliteal artery; tibial arteries; gonad; skin of leg; saphenous vein; right testis; skin of abdomen; sural nerve / n/a; More reference expression data
BioGPS	n/a
Orthologs
Databases	NCBI: entry; OMA: entry
Species	Human	Mouse
Entrez	100124700	n/a
Ensembl	ENSG00000228630	n/a
UniProt	n a	n/a
RefSeq (mRNA)	n/a	n/a
RefSeq (protein)	n/a	n/a
Location (UCSC)	Chr 12: 53.96 – 53.97 Mb	n/a
PubMed search		n/a
- Wikidata
View/Edit Human

HOTAIR (for HOX transcript antisense RNA) is a human gene located between HOXC11 and HOXC12 on chromosome 12. It is the first example of an RNA expressed on one chromosome that has been found to influence the transcription of the HOXD cluster posterior genes located on chromosome 2. The sequence and function of HOTAIR are different in humans and mice. Sequence analysis of HOTAIR revealed that it exists in mammals, has poorly conserved sequences and considerably conserved structures, and has evolved faster than nearby HoxC genes. A subsequent study identified HOTAIR has 32 nucleotides long conserved noncoding element (CNE) that has a paralogous copy in HOXD cluster region (located between HOXD11 and HOXD12), suggesting that the HOTAIR conserved sequences predate whole genome duplication events at the root of vertebrate. While the conserved sequence paralogous with HOXD cluster is 32 nucleotide long, the HOTAIR sequence conserved from human to fish is about 200 nucleotide long and is marked by active enhancer features (bidirectional transcription, H3K4me1 and H3K27ac peaks).

== Gene and transcribed RNA product ==
The HOTAIR gene contains 6,232 bp and encodes a 2.2 kb long noncoding RNA molecule, which controls gene expression. Its source DNA is located within a HOXC gene cluster. It is shuttled from chromosome 12 to chromosome 2 by the Suz-Twelve protein.

== Function ==
The 5′ end of HOTAIR interacts with a Polycomb-group protein Polycomb Repressive Complex 2 (PRC2) and as a result regulates chromatin state. It is required for gene-silencing of the HOXD locus by PRC2. PRC2 is dispensable for HOTAIR-mediated transcriptional silencing. The 3′ end of HOTAIR interacts with the histone demethylase LSD1.

It is an important factor in the epigenetic differentiation of skin over the surface of the body. Skin from various anatomical positions is distinct, e.g. the skin of the eyelid differs markedly from that on the sole.

== Clinical significance ==
HOTAIR is highly expressed in metastatic breast cancers. High levels of expression in primary breast tumours are a significant predictor of subsequent metastasis and death. This is partially due to HOTAIR-mediated overexpression of the HER2 oncogene through sequestration of miR-331-3p, which is a negative regulator of HER2 expression. In cells, especially those that over express PRC2, the prevention of HOTAIR expression leads to a reduction in invasive potential of that cell. It is also involved in esophageal squamous cell carcinoma.
