= NONCODE =

Content
- Description: annotation of long noncoding RNAs.

Contact
- Authors: Dechao Bu
- Primary citation: Bu & al. (2012)
- Release date: 2011

Access
- Website: http://www.noncode.org

Miscellaneous
- Version: v3.0

The NONCODE database is a collection of expression and functional lncRNA data obtained from re-annotated microarray studies.

== See also ==
- lncRNA
