= Sphinx (gene) =

Long non-coding RNA found in Drosophila

In molecular biology, Sphinx (spx) is a long non-coding RNA found in Drosophila. It is expressed in the brain, within the antennal lobe and inner antennocerebral tract. It is involved in the regulation of male courtship behaviour, this may be via olfactory neuron mediated regulation. Sphinx may act as a negative regulator of target genes. It is a chimeric gene, originating from a retroposed sequence of the ATP synthase chain F gene from chromosome 2 to chromosome 4. Nearby sequences were recruited to form an intron and an exon of this chimeric gene.

== See also ==
- Long noncoding RNA
