= GreeNC =

Wiki-database of plant lncRNAs

Content
- Description: plant lncRNA annotation and sequences
- Data types captured: provide a tool for the scientific community that can boost the research on lncRNAs
- Organisms: Plants and algae

Contact
- Research center: Sequentia Biotech
- Authors: Andreu Paytuvi Gallart; Antonio Hermoso Pulido; Irantzu Anzar Martinez de Lagran; Walter Sanseverino; Riccardo Aiese Cigliano
- Primary citation: doi:10.1093/nar/gkv1215
- Release date: 2015

Access
- Website: http://greenc.sciencedesigners.com/wiki/Main_Page

In bioinformatics, The Green Non-Coding Database, GreeNC, is a biological database that acts as an archive of plant lncRNAs and annotations. Started on 2015, the GreeNC database provides information on sequence, genome coordinates, coding potential and folding energy of lncRNAs. GreeNC includes about 200.000 pages with information on more than 190.000 transcripts from 37 plants and six algae. According to Paytuví and collaborators, by using the same pipeline to annotate lncRNAs GreeNC make it possible to compare lncRNA sequences and distribution from different species.
