= Pinc =

Pregnancy-induced noncoding RNA

Pregnancy induced noncoding RNA

Identifiers
- Organism: mouse
- Symbol: Pinc
- Entrez: 723792
- RefSeq (mRNA): NR_003202

Other data
- Chromosome: 1: 73.44 - 73.45 Mb

Pinc (pregnancy induced noncoding RNA) is a long non-coding RNA. It was originally identified in the mammary glands of oestrogen and progesterone-treated rats. Pinc may be a mammal-specific gene. It is conserved in a number of mammalian genomes (human, mouse, rat, chimpanzee, dog, cow and opossum), but not in fugu, zebrafish or xenopus genomes.

In mice, Pinc is expressed in the developing embryo and in the mammary glands of adults. Its expression in the mammary gland is induced by pregnancy and drops during lactation. It may have a role in cell survival and in the regulation of cell cycle progression.

== See also ==
- Long noncoding RNA
