= Polycomb repressive complex 1 =

Polycomb repressive complex 1 (PRC1) is one of the two classes of Polycomb Repressive complexes, the other being PRC2. Polycomb-group proteins play a major role in transcriptional regulation during development. Polycomb Repressive Complexes PRC1 and PRC2 function in the silencing of expression of the Hox gene network involved in development as well as the inactivation of the X chromosome. PRC1 inhibits the activated form of RNA polymerase II preinitiation complex with the use of H3K27me. PRC1 binds to three nucleosomes, this is believed to limit access of transcription factors to the chromatin, and therefore limit gene expression.
