= ZNRD1ASP =

Identifiers
- Aliases: ZNRD1ASP, C6orf12, HTEX4, NCRNA00171, TCTEX4, ZNRD1-AS, ZNRD1AS, ZNRD1AS1, ZNRD1-AS1, zinc ribbon domain containing 1 antisense, pseudogene, HCGVIII-1, HCG8, HCGVIII, ZNRD1 antisense RNA 1
- External IDs: OMIM: 615714; GeneCards: ZNRD1ASP

Gene location (Human)
Chr.	Chromosome 6 (human)
Band	6p22.1	Start	29,976,042 bp
Band	6p22.1	End	30,061,640 bp
Orthologs
Databases	NCBI: entry; OMA: entry
Species	Human	Mouse
Entrez	80862	n/a
Ensembl	ENSG00000235394; ENSG00000204623; ENSG00000236598; ENSG00000196299; ENSG00000229653 ENSG00000235814; ENSG00000225618; ENSG00000232691	n/a
UniProt	n a	n/a
RefSeq (mRNA)	n/a	n/a
RefSeq (protein)	n/a	n/a
Location (UCSC)	Chr 6: 29.98 – 30.06 Mb	n/a
PubMed search		n/a
- Wikidata
View/Edit Human

In molecular biology, ZNRD1ASP, also known as HTEX4 or ZNRD1-AS1, is non-function pseudogene. In humans, it is located in the MHC class I region of chromosome 6.
