= HP1BP3 =

Protein-coding gene in humans

Identifiers
- Aliases: HP1BP3, HP1-BP74, HP1BP74, heterochromatin protein 1 binding protein 3
- External IDs: OMIM: 616072; MGI: 109369; GeneCards: HP1BP3
Available structures
| PDB | Ortholog search: PDBe RCSB |
| PDB | List of PDB id codes 2RQP |

Gene location (Human)
| Chr. | Chromosome 1 (human) |
| Band | 1p36.12 | Start | 20,742,679 bp |
| Band | 1p36.12 | End | 20,787,323 bp |

Gene location (Mouse)
| Chr. | Chromosome 4 (mouse) |
| Band | 4|4 D3 | Start | 137,943,607 bp |
| Band | 4|4 D3 | End | 137,971,994 bp |
RNA expression pattern
| Bgee | Human / Mouse (ortholog); Top expressed in: Brodmann area 23; ventricular zone; tibia; trabecular bone; parietal pleura; visceral pleura; skin of hip; Achilles tendon; parotid gland; seminal vesicula / Top expressed in: renal corpuscle; medullary collecting duct; ventricular zone; condyle; ascending aorta; aortic valve; neural layer of retina; ganglionic eminence; vestibular membrane of cochlear duct; thymus; More reference expression data |
| BioGPS | n/a |
Gene ontology
| Molecular function | DNA binding; nucleosome binding; protein binding; chromatin binding |
| Cellular component | nucleosome; nucleus; chromosome; nuclear speck |
| Biological process | regulation of nucleus size; nucleosome assembly; heterochromatin organization; regulation of transcription, DNA-templated; regulation of cell population proliferation; cellular response to hypoxia |
Sources:Amigo / QuickGO
Orthologs
| Databases | NCBI: entry; OMA: entry |
| Species | Human | Mouse |
| Entrez | 50809 | 15441 |
| Ensembl | ENSG00000127483 | ENSMUSG00000028759 |
| UniProt | Q5SSJ5 | Q3TEA8 |
| RefSeq (mRNA) | NM_016287; NM_001372052 | NM_001122896; NM_001122897; NM_001285478; NM_001285479; NM_001285480 NM_001285481; NM_010470; NM_001356431; NM_001356432 |
| RefSeq (protein) | NP_057371; NP_001358981; NP_001363716; NP_001363717; NP_001363718 NP_001363719; NP_001363720; NP_001363721; NP_001363722; NP_001363723; NP_001363724; NP_001363725; NP_001363726 | NP_001116368; NP_001116369; NP_001272407; NP_001272408; NP_001272409 NP_001272410; NP_034600; NP_001343360; NP_001343361 |
| Location (UCSC) | Chr 1: 20.74 – 20.79 Mb | Chr 4: 137.94 – 137.97 Mb |
| PubMed search |
- Wikidata
| View/Edit Human | View/Edit Mouse |

Heterochromatin protein 1, binding protein 3 is a protein that in humans is encoded by the HP1BP3 gene. It has been identified as a novel subtype of the linker histone H1, involved in the structure of heterochromatin.
