= IGF2-AS =

Identifiers
- Aliases: IGF2-AS, IGF2-AS1, PEG8, IGF2 antisense RNA
- External IDs: OMIM: 610146; GeneCards: IGF2-AS; OMA:IGF2-AS - orthologs

Gene location (Human)
Chr.	Chromosome 11 (human)
Band	11p15.5	Start	2,140,501 bp
Band	11p15.5	End	2,148,666 bp
RNA expression pattern
Bgee	Human / Mouse (ortholog); Top expressed in: cartilage tissue; placenta; right lobe of liver; stromal cell of endometrium; islet of Langerhans; developmental structure; face; mucosa of nose; tibial nerve; ganglionic eminence / n/a; More reference expression data
BioGPS	n/a
Orthologs
Species	Human	Mouse
Entrez	51214	n/a
Ensembl	ENSG00000099869	n/a
UniProt	n a	n/a
RefSeq (mRNA)	NM_016412	n/a
RefSeq (protein)	n/a	n/a
Location (UCSC)	Chr 11: 2.14 – 2.15 Mb	n/a
PubMed search		n/a
- Wikidata
View/Edit Human

IGF2 antisense RNA is a protein that in humans is encoded by the IGF2-AS gene.

== Function ==
This gene is expressed in antisense to the insulin-like growth factor 2 (IGF2) gene and is imprinted and paternally expressed. It is thought to be non-coding because the putative protein is not conserved and translation is predicted to trigger nonsense mediated decay (NMD). Transcripts from this gene are produced in tumors and may function to suppress cell growth. Alternative splicing results in multiple transcript variants. [provided by RefSeq, Nov 2015].
