= H3K27 =

H3K27 is the 27th amino acid in Histone H3, which as a lysine is written "K" in single-letter amino acid notation. It is subject to posttranslational modifications with epigenetic effects:

- H3K27ac, an acetylation
- H3K27me3, a tri methylation
