= Chromobox 7 =

Protein-coding gene in humans

CBX7

Identifiers
- Aliases: CBX7, chromobox 7
- External IDs: OMIM: 608457; MGI: 1196439; GeneCards: CBX7
Available structures
PDB	Ortholog search: PDBe RCSB
PDB	List of PDB id codes 2K1B, 2L12, 2L1B, 3GS2, 4MN3, 5EPJ

Gene location (Human)
Chr.	Chromosome 22 (human)
Band	22q13.1	Start	39,120,167 bp
Band	22q13.1	End	39,152,680 bp

Gene location (Mouse)
Chr.	Chromosome 15 (mouse)
Band	15 E1|15 37.85 cM	Start	79,800,008 bp
Band	15 E1|15 37.85 cM	End	79,855,320 bp
RNA expression pattern
Bgee	Human / Mouse (ortholog); Top expressed in: cerebellar vermis; paraflocculus of cerebellum; Brodmann area 10; right hemisphere of cerebellum; frontal pole; gastric mucosa; middle frontal gyrus; pons; right coronary artery; right frontal lobe / Top expressed in: yolk sac; spermatocyte; neural layer of retina; cerebellar cortex; muscle of thigh; superior frontal gyrus; mesenteric lymph nodes; epiblast; lip; right kidney; More reference expression data
BioGPS	n/a
Gene ontology
Molecular function	protein binding; methylated histone binding; chromatin binding; single-stranded RNA binding
Cellular component	PcG protein complex; nucleus; nucleoplasm; cytosol; PRC1 complex
Biological process	regulation of transcription, DNA-templated; negative regulation of transcription by RNA polymerase II; transcription, DNA-templated; chromatin organization; sebaceous gland development
Sources:Amigo / QuickGO
Orthologs
Databases	NCBI: entry; OMA: entry
Species	Human	Mouse
Entrez	23492	52609
Ensembl	ENSG00000100307	ENSMUSG00000053411
UniProt	O95931	Q8VDS3
RefSeq (mRNA)	NM_175709; NM_001346743; NM_001346744	NM_144811
RefSeq (protein)	NP_001333672; NP_001333673; NP_783640; NP_783640.1	NP_659060
Location (UCSC)	Chr 22: 39.12 – 39.15 Mb	Chr 15: 79.8 – 79.86 Mb
PubMed search
- Wikidata
View/Edit Human	View/Edit Mouse

Chromobox homolog 7 is a protein that in humans is encoded by the CBX7 gene. The loss of CBX7 gene expression has been shown to correlate with a malignant form of thyroid cancer.
