= SUZ12 =

Protein-coding gene in the species Homo sapiens

Identifiers
- Aliases: SUZ12, CHET9, JJAZ1, SUZ12 polycomb repressive complex 2 subunit, polycomb repressive complex 2 subunit, IMMAS
- External IDs: OMIM: 606245; MGI: 1261758; GeneCards: SUZ12
Available structures
PDB	Ortholog search: PDBe RCSB
PDB	List of PDB id codes 5IJ7, 5IJ8, 5HYN

Gene location (Human)
Chr.	Chromosome 17 (human)
Band	17q11.2	Start	31,937,007 bp
Band	17q11.2	End	32,001,038 bp

Gene location (Mouse)
Chr.	Chromosome 11 (mouse)
Band	11 B5|11 47.36 cM	Start	79,883,932 bp
Band	11 B5|11 47.36 cM	End	79,924,949 bp
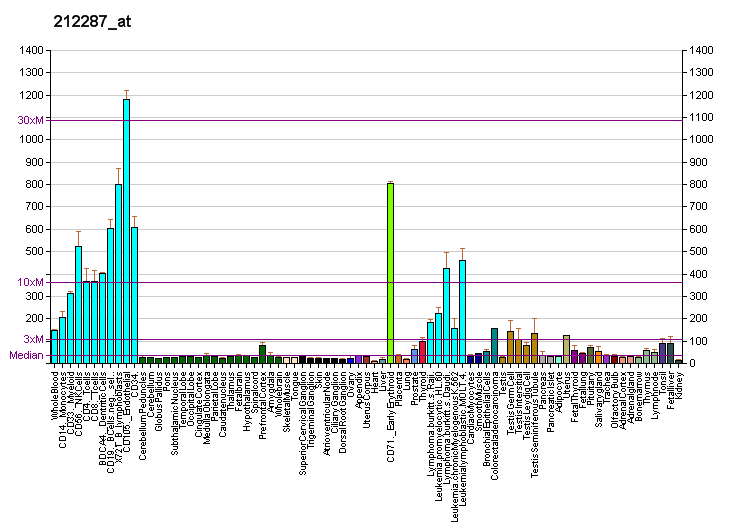

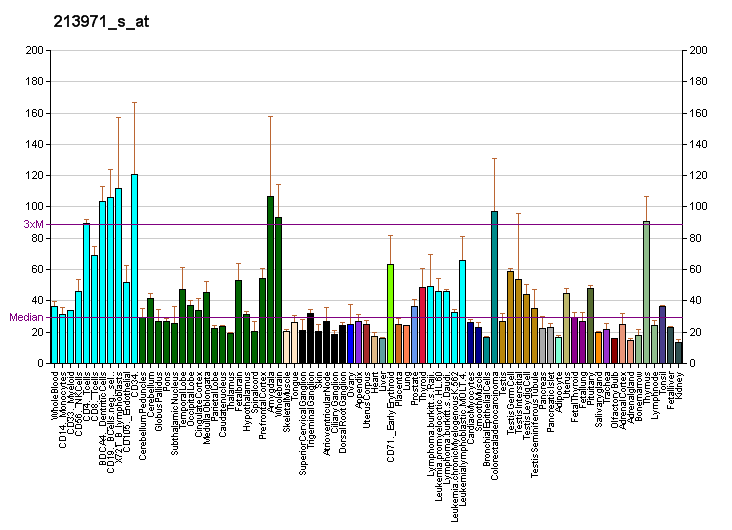
RNA expression pattern
Bgee	Human / Mouse (ortholog); Top expressed in: trabecular bone; mucosa of paranasal sinus; buccal mucosa cell; Epithelium of choroid plexus; pylorus; renal medulla; seminal vesicula; hair follicle; cartilage tissue; ventricular zone / Top expressed in: medullary collecting duct; zygote; secondary oocyte; renal corpuscle; primary oocyte; atrioventricular valve; saccule; ventricular zone; tail of embryo; otic placode; More reference expression data
BioGPS	More reference expression data
Gene ontology
Molecular function	histone methyltransferase activity; sequence-specific DNA binding; chromatin binding; metal ion binding; methylated histone binding; protein binding; RNA binding; RNA polymerase II core promoter sequence-specific DNA binding; chromatin DNA binding; promoter-specific chromatin binding; histone methyltransferase activity (H3-K27 specific); RNA polymerase II cis-regulatory region sequence-specific DNA binding
Cellular component	sex chromatin; ESC/E(Z) complex; nucleoplasm; protein-DNA complex; nucleolus; nucleus; RSC-type complex; nuclear body
Biological process	negative regulation of cell differentiation; negative regulation of transcription by RNA polymerase II; transcription, DNA-templated; negative regulation of gene expression, epigenetic; positive regulation of cell population proliferation; histone methylation; histone ubiquitination; regulation of transcription, DNA-templated; histone H3-K27 methylation; negative regulation of G0 to G1 transition; chromatin organization
Sources:Amigo / QuickGO
Orthologs
Databases	NCBI: entry; OMA: entry
Species	Human	Mouse
Entrez	23512	52615
Ensembl	ENSG00000178691	ENSMUSG00000017548
UniProt	Q15022	Q80U70
RefSeq (mRNA)	NM_015355; NM_001321207	NM_001163018; NM_199196
RefSeq (protein)	NP_001308136; NP_056170	NP_001156490; NP_954666
Location (UCSC)	Chr 17: 31.94 – 32 Mb	Chr 11: 79.88 – 79.92 Mb
PubMed search
- Wikidata
View/Edit Human	View/Edit Mouse

Polycomb protein SUZ12 is a protein that in humans is encoded by the SUZ12 gene.

== Function ==
This zinc finger gene has been identified at the breakpoints of a recurrent chromosomal translocation reported in endometrial stromal sarcoma. Recombination of these breakpoints results in the fusion of this gene and JAZF1. The protein encoded by this gene contains a zinc finger domain in the C terminus of the coding region. The specific function of this gene has not yet been determined.

SUZ12, as part of Polycomb Repressive Complex 2 (PRC2), may be involved with chromatin silencing in conjunction with HOTAIR ncRNA, using its zinc-finger domain to bind the RNA molecule.
