= Polycomb Repressive Complex 2 =

Protein complex

3D reconstruction of the human PRC2-AEBP2 complex.

Polycomb repressive complex 2 (PRC2) is one of the two classes of polycomb-group proteins or (PcG). The other component of this group of proteins is PRC1 (Polycomb Repressive Complex 1).

This complex has histone methyltransferase activity and primarily methylates histone H3 on lysine 27 (i.e. H3K27me3), a mark of transcriptionally silent chromatin. PRC2 is required for initial targeting of genomic region (PRC Response Elements or PRE) to be silenced, while PRC1 is required for stabilizing this silencing and underlies cellular memory of silenced region after cellular differentiation. PRC1 also mono-ubiquitinates histone H2A on lysine 119 (H2AK119Ub1). These proteins are required for long term epigenetic silencing of chromatin and have an important role in stem cell differentiation and early embryonic development. PRC2 are present in most multicellular organisms.

The mouse PRC2 has four subunits: Suz12 (zinc finger), Eed, Ezh1 or Ezh2 (SET domain with histone methyltransferase activity) and Rbbp4 (histone binding domain). PRC2 can bind to H3K27me3 and repress neighboring nucleosomes, thus spreading the repression.

PRC2 has a role in X chromosome inactivation, in maintenance of stem cell fate, and in imprinting. Aberrant expression of PRC2 has been observed in cancer. Both loss and gain-of-function mutations in PRC2 components have been identified in various human cancers, suggesting complex roles of these components in malignancy.

Polycomb group genes directly and indirectly regulate the DNA damage response which acts as an anti-cancer barrier. The PRC2 complex appears to be present at sites of DNA double-strand breaks where it promotes repair of such breaks by non-homologous end joining.

The PRC2 is evolutionarily conserved, and has been found in mammals, insects, fungi, and plants.

== In plants ==
In Arabidopsis thaliana, a plant model organism, several variants of the core subunits have been identified. Homologs of the Suz12 subunit are: Embryonic flower 2 (EMF2), reduced vernalization response 2 (VRN2), fertilization independent seed 2 (FIS2). There is one Eed homolog, fertilization independent endosperm (FIE). three Ezh1/Ezh2 homologs, curly leaf (CLF), swinger (SWN), medea (MEA), and one Rbbp4 homolog, multicopy suppressor of IRA1 (MSI1). Many other accessory components of PRC2 complex in Arabidopsis have been identified.

== See also ==
- Epigenetics
