= Long non-coding RNA =

Non-protein coding transcripts longer than 200 nucleotides

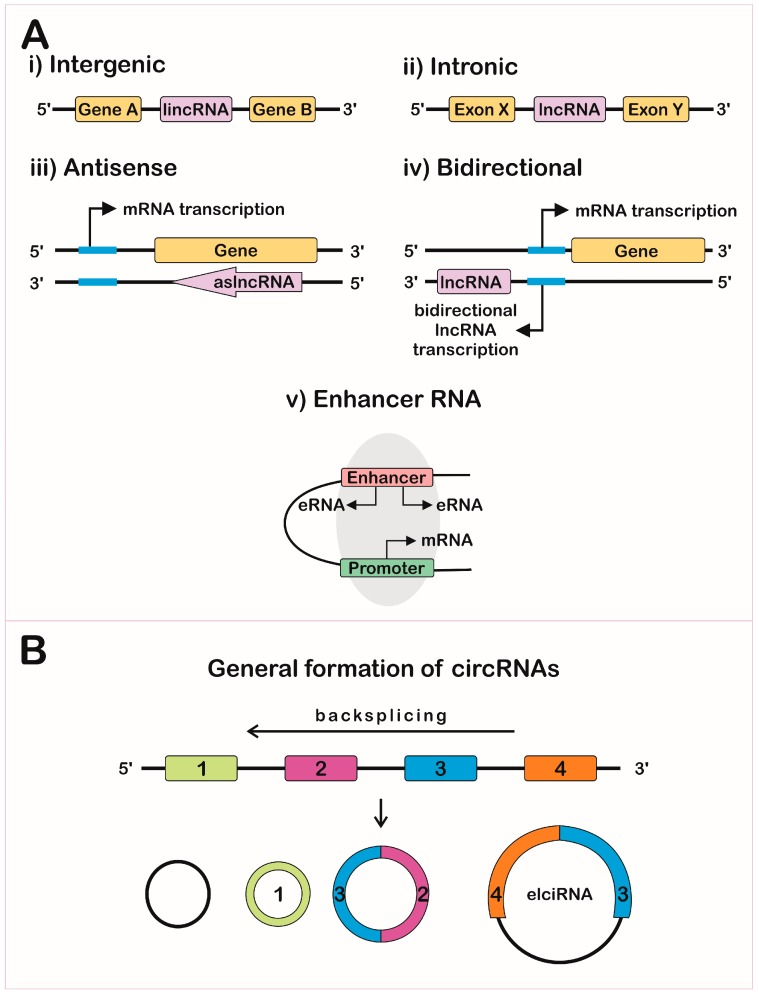
Different types of long non-coding RNAs.

Long non-coding RNAs (long ncRNAs, lncRNA) are a type of RNA, generally defined as transcripts of more than 200 nucleotides that are not translated into protein. This arbitrary limit distinguishes long ncRNAs from small non-coding RNAs, such as microRNAs (miRNAs), small interfering RNAs (siRNAs), Piwi-interacting RNAs (piRNAs), small nucleolar RNAs (snoRNAs), and other short RNAs. Given that some genuine lncRNAs may encode small proteins, the latest definition of lncRNA is a class of transcripts of over 200 nucleotides that have no or limited coding capacity.

The definition of lncRNAs differs from that of other RNAs such as siRNAs, mRNAs, miRNAs, and snoRNAs because it is not connected to the function of the RNA. A lncRNA is any transcript that is not one of the other well-characterized RNAs and is longer than 200-500 nucleotides. Some scientists think that most lncRNAs do not have a biologically relevant function because they are transcripts of junk DNA.

== Abundance ==
Long non-coding transcripts are found in many species. Large-scale complementary DNA (cDNA) sequencing projects such as FANTOM reveal the complexity of these transcripts in humans. The FANTOM3 project identified ~35,000 non-coding transcripts that bear many signatures of messenger RNAs, including 5' capping, splicing, and poly-adenylation, but have little or no open reading frame (ORF). This number represents a conservative lower estimate, since it omitted many singleton transcripts and non-polyadenylated transcripts (tiling array data shows more than 40% of transcripts are non-polyadenylated). Identifying ncRNAs within these cDNA libraries is challenging since it can be difficult to distinguish protein-coding transcripts from non-coding transcripts. It has been suggested through multiple studies that testis, and neural tissues express the greatest amount of long non-coding RNAs of any tissue type. Using FANTOM5, 27,919 long ncRNAs have been identified in various human sources.

Quantitatively, these transcripts demonstrate ~10-fold lower abundance than mRNAs, much of which is explained by higher cell-to-cell variation of expression levels of lncRNAs in the individual cells, when compared to protein-coding genes and well-characterized non-coding genes. This is consistent with the idea that many of these transcripts are non-functional spurious transcripts and the transcribed regions are not genes by any standard definition.

In general, the majority (~78%) of lncRNAs are characterized as tissue-specific, as opposed to only ~19% of mRNAs. In addition to higher tissue specificity, lncRNAs are characterized by higher developmental stage specificity, and cell subtype specificity in tissues such as human neocortex and other parts of the brain, regulating correct brain development and function. In 2022, a comprehensive integration of lncRNAs from existing databases, revealed that there are 95,243 lncRNAs and 323,950 transcripts in humans.

In comparison to mammals relatively few studies have focused on the prevalence of lncRNAs in plants. However an extensive study considering 37 higher plant species and six algae identified ~200,000 non-coding transcripts using an in-silico approach, which also established the associated Green Non-Coding Database (GreeNC), a repository of plant lncRNAs.

== Genomic organization ==
In 2005 the landscape of the mammalian genome was described as numerous 'foci' of transcription that are separated by long stretches of intergenic space. While some long ncRNAs are located within the intergenic stretches, the majority are overlapping sense and antisense transcripts that often include protein-coding genes, giving rise to a complex hierarchy of overlapping isoforms. Genomic sequences within these transcriptional foci are often shared within a number of coding and non-coding transcripts in the sense and antisense directions For example, 3012 out of 8961 cDNAs previously annotated as truncated coding sequences within FANTOM2 were later designated as genuine ncRNA variants of protein-coding cDNAs. While the abundance and conservation of these arrangements suggest they have biological relevance, the complexity of these foci frustrates easy evaluation.

The GENCODE consortium has collated and analysed a comprehensive set of human lncRNA annotations and their genomic organisation, modifications, cellular locations and tissue expression profiles. Their analysis indicates human lncRNAs show a bias toward two-exon transcripts.

== Translation ==
There has been considerable debate about whether lncRNAs have been misannotated and do in fact encode proteins. Several lncRNAs have been found to in fact encode for peptides with biologically significant function. Ribosome profiling studies have suggested that anywhere from 40% to 90% of annotated lncRNAs are in fact translated, although there is disagreement about the correct method for analyzing ribosome profiling data. Additionally, it is thought that many of the peptides produced by lncRNAs may be highly unstable and without biological function.

== Conservation ==
The sequences of most long non-coding transcripts are not conserved, which supports the idea that most of them are spurious transcripts with no biological function. Initial studies into lncRNA conservation noted that some of them were enriched for conserved sequence elements, depleted in substitution and insertion/deletion rates and depleted in rare frequency variants, indicative of purifying selection maintaining lncRNA function. However, further investigations into vertebrate lncRNAs revealed that while some lncRNAs are conserved in sequence, they are not conserved in transcription. In other words, even when the sequence of a human lncRNA is conserved in another vertebrate species, there is often no transcription of a lncRNA in the orthologous genomic region. Some argue that these observations suggest non-functionality of the majority of lncRNAs, while others argue that they may be indicative of rapid species-specific adaptive selection.

While most long non-coding transcripts are not conserved, hundreds of lncRNAs are conserved at the sequence level. There have been several attempts to delineate the different categories of selection signatures seen amongst lncRNAs including: lncRNAs with strong sequence conservation across the entire length of the gene, lncRNAs in which only a portion of the transcript (e.g. 5′ end, splice sites) is conserved, and lncRNAs that are transcribed from syntenic regions of the genome but have no recognizable sequence similarity. Additionally, there have been attempts to identify conserved secondary structures in lncRNAs, though these studies have currently given way to conflicting results. Several of the most well studied lncRNA have indicated conservation of structure within the functional domains of lncRNA, with lack of sequence similarity across species.

== Functions ==
Some groups have claimed that the majority of long noncoding RNAs in mammals are likely to be functional, but other groups have claimed the opposite. This is an active area of research.

Some lncRNAs have been functionally annotated in LncRNAdb (a database of literature described lncRNAs), with the majority of these being described in humans. Over 2600 human lncRNAs with experimental evidences have been community-curated in LncRNAWiki (a wiki-based, publicly editable and open-content platform for community curation of human lncRNAs). According to the curation of functional mechanisms of lncRNAs based on the literatures, lncRNAs are extensively reported to be involved in ceRNA regulation, transcriptional regulation, and epigenetic regulation. A further large-scale sequencing study provides evidence that many transcripts thought to be lncRNAs may, in fact, be translated into proteins.

=== In the regulation of gene transcription ===
==== In gene-specific transcription ====
In eukaryotes, RNA transcription is a tightly regulated process. Noncoding RNAs act upon different aspects of this process, targeting transcriptional modulators, RNA polymerase (RNAP) II and even the DNA duplex to regulate gene expression.

NcRNAs modulate transcription by several mechanisms, including functioning themselves as co-regulators, modifying transcription factor activity, or regulating the association and activity of co-regulators. For example, the noncoding RNA Evf-2 functions as a co-activator for the homeobox transcription factor Dlx2, which plays important roles in forebrain development and neurogenesis. Sonic hedgehog induces transcription of Evf-2 from an ultra-conserved element located between the Dlx5 and Dlx6 genes during forebrain development. Evf-2 then recruits the Dlx2 transcription factor to the same ultra-conserved element whereby Dlx2 subsequently induces expression of Dlx5. The existence of other similar ultra- or highly conserved elements within the mammalian genome that are both transcribed and fulfill enhancer functions suggest Evf-2 may be illustrative of a generalised mechanism that regulates developmental genes with complex expression patterns during vertebrate growth. Indeed, the transcription and expression of similar non-coding ultraconserved elements was shown to be abnormal in human leukaemia and to contribute to apoptosis in colon cancer cells, suggesting their involvement in tumorigenesis in like fashion to protein-coding RNA.

Local ncRNAs can also recruit transcriptional programmes to regulate adjacent protein-coding gene expression.

The RNA binding protein TLS binds and inhibits the CREB binding protein and p300 histone acetyltransferase activities on a repressed gene target, cyclin D1. The recruitment of TLS to the promoter of cyclin D1 is directed by long ncRNAs expressed at low levels and tethered to 5' regulatory regions in response to DNA damage signals. Moreover, these local ncRNAs act cooperatively as ligands to modulate the activities of TLS. In the broad sense, this mechanism allows the cell to harness RNA-binding proteins, which make up one of the largest classes within the mammalian proteome, and integrate their function in transcriptional programs. Nascent long ncRNAs have been shown to increase the activity of CREB binding protein, which in turn increases the transcription of that ncRNA. A study found that a lncRNA in the antisense direction of the Apolipoprotein A1 (APOA1) regulates the transcription of APOA1 through epigenetic modifications.

Recent evidence has raised the possibility that transcription of genes that escape from X-inactivation might be mediated by expression of long non-coding RNA within the escaping chromosomal domains.

==== Regulating basal transcription machinery ====
NcRNAs also target general transcription factors required for the RNAP II transcription of all genes. These general factors include components of the initiation complex that assemble on promoters or involved in transcription elongation. A ncRNA transcribed from an upstream minor promoter of the dihydrofolate reductase (DHFR) gene forms a stable RNA-DNA triplex within the major promoter of DHFR to prevent the binding of the transcriptional co-factor TFIIB. This novel mechanism of regulating gene expression may represent a widespread method of controlling promoter usage, as thousands of RNA-DNA triplexes exist in eukaryotic chromosome. The U1 ncRNA can induce transcription by binding to and stimulating TFIIH to phosphorylate the C-terminal domain of RNAP II. In contrast the ncRNA 7SK is able to repress transcription elongation by, in combination with HEXIM1/2, forming an inactive complex that prevents PTEFb from phosphorylating the C-terminal domain of RNAP II, repressing global elongation under stressful conditions. These examples, which bypass specific modes of regulation at individual promoters provide a means of quickly affecting global changes in gene expression.

The ability to quickly mediate global changes is also apparent in the rapid expression of non-coding repetitive sequences. The short interspersed nuclear (SINE) Alu elements in humans and analogous B1 and B2 elements in mice have succeeded in becoming the most abundant mobile elements within the genomes, comprising ~10% of the human and ~6% of the mouse genome, respectively. These elements are transcribed as ncRNAs by RNAP III in response to environmental stresses such as heat shock, where they then bind to RNAP II with high affinity and prevent the formation of active pre-initiation complexes. This allows for the broad and rapid repression of gene expression in response to stress.

A dissection of the functional sequences within Alu RNA transcripts has drafted a modular structure analogous to the organization of domains in protein transcription factors. The Alu RNA contains two 'arms', each of which may bind one RNAP II molecule, as well as two regulatory domains that are responsible for RNAP II transcriptional repression in vitro. These two loosely structured domains may even be concatenated to other ncRNAs such as B1 elements to impart their repressive role. The abundance and distribution of Alu elements and similar repetitive elements throughout the mammalian genome may be partly due to these functional domains being co-opted into other long ncRNAs during evolution, with the presence of functional repeat sequence domains being a common characteristic of several known long ncRNAs including Kcnq1ot1, Xlsirt and Xist.

In addition to heat shock, the expression of SINE elements (including Alu, B1, and B2 RNAs) increases during cellular stress such as viral infection in some cancer cells where they may similarly regulate global changes to gene expression. The ability of Alu and B2 RNA to bind directly to RNAP II provides a broad mechanism to repress transcription. Nevertheless, there are specific exceptions to this global response where Alu or B2 RNAs are not found at activated promoters of genes undergoing induction, such as the heat shock genes. This additional hierarchy of regulation that exempts individual genes from the generalised repression also involves a long ncRNA, heat shock RNA-1 (HSR-1). It was argued that HSR-1 is present in mammalian cells in an inactive state, but upon stress is activated to induce the expression of heat shock genes. This activation involves a conformational alteration of HSR-1 in response to rising temperatures, permitting its interaction with the transcriptional activator HSF-1, which trimerizes and induces the expression of heat shock genes. In the broad sense, these examples illustrate a regulatory circuit nested within ncRNAs whereby Alu or B2 RNAs repress general gene expression, while other ncRNAs activate the expression of specific genes.

==== Transcribed by RNA polymerase III ====
Many of the ncRNAs that interact with general transcription factors or RNAP II itself (including 7SK, Alu and B1 and B2 RNAs) are transcribed by RNAP III, uncoupling their expression from RNAP II, which they regulate. RNAP III also transcribes other ncRNAs, such as BC2, BC200 and some microRNAs and snoRNAs, in addition to housekeeping ncRNA genes such as tRNAs, 5S rRNAs and snRNAs. The existence of an RNAP III-dependent ncRNA transcriptome that regulates its RNAP II-dependent counterpart is supported by the finding of a set of ncRNAs transcribed by RNAP III with sequence homology to protein-coding genes. This prompted the authors to posit a 'cogene/gene' functional regulatory network, showing that one of these ncRNAs, 21A, regulates the expression of its antisense partner gene, CENP-F in trans.

=== In post-transcriptional regulation ===
In addition to regulating transcription, ncRNAs also control various aspects of post-transcriptional mRNA processing. Similar to small regulatory RNAs such as microRNAs and snoRNAs, these functions often involve complementary base pairing with the target mRNA. The formation of RNA duplexes between complementary ncRNA and mRNA may mask key elements within the mRNA required to bind trans-acting factors, potentially affecting any step in post-transcriptional gene expression including pre-mRNA processing and splicing, transport, translation, and degradation.

==== In splicing ====
The splicing of mRNA can induce its translation and functionally diversify the repertoire of proteins it encodes. The Zeb2 mRNA requires the retention of a 5'UTR intron that contains an internal ribosome entry site for efficient translation. The retention of the intron depends on the expression of an antisense transcript that complements the intronic 5' splice site. Therefore, the ectopic expression of the antisense transcript represses splicing and induces translation of the Zeb2 mRNA during mesenchymal development. Likewise, the expression of an overlapping antisense Rev-ErbAa2 transcript controls the alternative splicing of the thyroid hormone receptor ErbAa2 mRNA to form two antagonistic isoforms. Another well-characterized lncRNA involved in splicing is MALAT1 (metastasis associated lung adenocarcinoma transcript 1). MALAT1 localizes predominantly to nuclear speckles and has been reported to regulate the distribution and activity of splicing factors, thereby influencing alternative splicing of a subset of pre-mRNAs.

==== In translation ====
NcRNA may also apply additional regulatory pressures during translation, a property particularly exploited in neurons where the dendritic or axonal translation of mRNA in response to synaptic activity contributes to changes in synaptic plasticity and the remodelling of neuronal networks. The RNAP III transcribed BC1 and BC200 ncRNAs, that previously derived from tRNAs, are expressed in the mouse and human central nervous system, respectively. BC1 expression is induced in response to synaptic activity and synaptogenesis and is specifically targeted to dendrites in neurons. Sequence complementarity between BC1 and regions of various neuron-specific mRNAs also suggest a role for BC1 in targeted translational repression. Indeed, it was recently shown that BC1 is associated with translational repression in dendrites to control the efficiency of dopamine D2 receptor-mediated transmission in the striatum and BC1 RNA-deleted mice exhibit behavioural changes with reduced exploration and increased anxiety.

==== In siRNA-directed gene regulation ====
In addition to masking key elements within single-stranded RNA, the formation of double-stranded RNA duplexes can also provide a substrate for the generation of endogenous siRNAs (endo-siRNAs) in Drosophila and mouse oocytes. The annealing of complementary sequences, such as antisense or repetitive regions between transcripts, forms an RNA duplex that may be processed by Dicer-2 into endo-siRNAs. Also, long ncRNAs that form extended intramolecular hairpins may be processed into siRNAs, compellingly illustrated by the esi-1 and esi-2 transcripts. Endo-siRNAs generated from these transcripts seem particularly useful in suppressing the spread of mobile transposon elements within the genome in the germline. However, the generation of endo-siRNAs from antisense transcripts or pseudogenes may also silence the expression of their functional counterparts via RISC effector complexes, acting as an important node that integrates various modes of long and short RNA regulation, as exemplified by the Xist and Tsix (see above).

=== In epigenetic regulation ===
Epigenetic modifications, including histone and DNA methylation, histone acetylation and sumoylation, affect many aspects of chromosomal biology, primarily including regulation of large numbers of genes by remodeling broad chromatin domains. While it has been known for some time that RNA is an integral component of chromatin, it is only recently that we are beginning to appreciate the means by which RNA is involved in pathways of chromatin modification. For example, Oplr16 epigenetically induces the activation of stem cell core factors by coordinating intrachromosomal looping and recruitment of DNA demethylase TET2.

Studies using adult human cells have shown that the embryonic pattern of Hox gene expression is maintained in adult cells, indicating that the Hox loci are under strong epigenetic control. Indeed, the human Hox genes are associated with hundreds of ncRNAs that are sequentially expressed along both the spatial and temporal axes of human development and define chromatin domains of differential histone methylation and RNA polymerase accessibility. One ncRNA, termed HOTAIR, that originates from the HOXC locus represses transcription across 40 kb of the HOXD locus by altering chromatin trimethylation state. HOTAIR is thought to achieve this by directing the action of Polycomb chromatin remodeling complexes in trans to govern the cells' epigenetic state and subsequent gene expression. Components of the Polycomb complex, including Suz12, EZH2 and EED, contain RNA binding domains that may potentially bind HOTAIR and probably other similar ncRNAs. This example nicely illustrates a broader theme whereby ncRNAs recruit the function of a generic suite of chromatin modifying proteins to specific genomic loci, underscoring the complexity of recently published genomic maps. Interestingly, long ncRNAs interact with chromatin modifying proteins such as the PRC2 complex to guide gene silencing in several malignancies. In MM, the long ncRNA PVT1 interacts with EZH2, the catalytic subunit of PRC2, to guide the silencing of genes with pro-apoptotic and tumor suppressor properties thus facilitating tumor growth and progression. Indeed, the prevalence of long ncRNAs associated with protein coding genes may contribute to localised patterns of chromatin modifications that regulate gene expression during development. For example, the majority of protein-coding genes have antisense partners, including many tumour suppressor genes that are frequently silenced by epigenetic mechanisms in cancer. A recent study observed an inverse expression profile of the p15 gene and an antisense ncRNA in leukaemia. A detailed analysis showed the p15 antisense ncRNA (CDKN2BAS) was able to induce changes to heterochromatin and DNA methylation status of p15 by an unknown mechanism, thereby regulating p15 expression. Therefore, misexpression of the associated antisense ncRNAs may subsequently silence the tumour suppressor gene contributing towards cancer.

==== Imprinting ====
Many emergent themes of ncRNA-directed chromatin modification were first apparent within the phenomenon of imprinting, whereby only one allele of a gene is expressed from either the maternal or the paternal chromosome. In general, imprinted genes are clustered together on chromosomes, suggesting the imprinting mechanism acts upon local chromosome domains rather than individual genes. These clusters are also often associated with long ncRNAs whose expression is correlated with the repression of the linked protein-coding gene on the same allele. Indeed, detailed analysis has revealed a crucial role for the ncRNAs Kcnqot1 and Igf2r/Air in directing imprinting.

Almost all the genes at the Kcnq1 loci are maternally inherited, except the paternally expressed antisense ncRNA Kcnqot1. Transgenic mice with truncated Kcnq1ot fail to silence the adjacent genes, suggesting that Kcnqot1 is crucial to the imprinting of genes on the paternal chromosome. It appears that Kcnqot1 is able to direct the trimethylation of lysine 9 (H3K9me3) and 27 of histone 3 (H3K27me3) to an imprinting centre that overlaps the Kcnqot1 promoter and actually resides within a Kcnq1 sense exon. Similar to HOTAIR (see above), Eed-Ezh2 Polycomb complexes are recruited to the Kcnq1 loci paternal chromosome, possibly by Kcnqot1, where they may mediate gene silencing through repressive histone methylation. A differentially methylated imprinting centre also overlaps the promoter of a long antisense ncRNA Air that is responsible for the silencing of neighbouring genes at the Igf2r locus on the paternal chromosome. The presence of allele-specific histone methylation at the Igf2r locus suggests Air also mediates silencing via chromatin modification.

==== Xist and X-chromosome inactivation ====
The inactivation of a X-chromosome in female placental mammals is directed by one of the earliest and best characterized long ncRNAs, Xist. The expression of Xist from the future inactive X-chromosome, and its subsequent coating of the inactive X-chromosome, occurs during early embryonic stem cell differentiation. Xist expression is followed by irreversible layers of chromatin modifications that include the loss of the histone (H3K9) acetylation and H3K4 methylation that are associated with active chromatin, and the induction of repressive chromatin modifications including H4 hypoacetylation, H3K27 trimethylation, H3K9 hypermethylation and H4K20 monomethylation as well as H2AK119 monoubiquitylation. These modifications coincide with the transcriptional silencing of the X-linked genes. Xist RNA also localises the histone variant macroH2A to the inactive X–chromosome. There are additional ncRNAs that are also present at the Xist loci, including an antisense transcript Tsix, which is expressed from the future active chromosome and able to repress Xist expression by the generation of endogenous siRNA. Together these ncRNAs ensure that only one X-chromosome is active in female mammals.

==== Telomeric non-coding RNAs ====
Telomeres form the terminal region of mammalian chromosomes and are essential for stability and aging and play central roles in diseases such as cancer. Telomeres have been long considered transcriptionally inert DNA-protein complexes until it was shown in the late 2000s that telomeric repeats may be transcribed as telomeric RNAs (TelRNAs) or telomeric repeat-containing RNAs. These ncRNAs are heterogeneous in length, transcribed from several sub-telomeric loci and physically localise to telomeres. Their association with chromatin, which suggests an involvement in regulating telomere specific heterochromatin modifications, is repressed by SMG proteins that protect chromosome ends from telomere loss. In addition, TelRNAs block telomerase activity in vitro and may therefore regulate telomerase activity. Although early, these studies suggest an involvement for telomeric ncRNAs in various aspects of telomere biology.

=== In regulation of DNA replication timing and chromosome stability ===
Asynchronously replicating autosomal RNAs (ASARs) are very long (~200kb) non-coding RNAs that are non-spliced, non-polyadenylated, and are required for normal DNA replication timing and chromosome stability. Deletion of any one of the genetic loci containing ASAR6, ASAR15, or ASAR6-141 results in the same phenotype of delayed replication timing and delayed mitotic condensation (DRT/DMC) of the entire chromosome. DRT/DMC results in chromosomal segregation errors that lead to increased frequency of secondary rearrangements and an unstable chromosome. Similar to Xist, ASARs show random monoallelic expression and exist in asynchronous DNA replication domains. Although the mechanism of ASAR function is still under investigation, it is hypothesized that they work via similar mechanisms as the Xist lncRNA, but on smaller autosomal domains resulting in allele specific changes in gene expression.

Incorrect reparation of DNA double-strand breaks (DSB) leading to chromosomal rearrangements is one of the oncogenesis's primary causes. A number of lncRNAs are crucial at the different stages of the main pathways of DSB repair in eukaryotic cells: nonhomologous end joining (NHEJ) and homology-directed repair (HDR). Gene mutations or variation in expression levels of such RNAs can lead to local DNA repair defects, increasing the chromosome aberration frequency. Moreover, it was demonstrated that some RNAs could stimulate long-range chromosomal rearrangements.

== Structure ==
It took over two decades after the discovery of the first human long non-coding transcripts for the functional significance of lncRNA structures to be fully recognized. Early structural studies led to the proposal of several hypotheses for classifying lncRNA architectures. One hypothesis suggests that lncRNAs may feature a compact tertiary structure, similar to ribozymes like the ribosome or self-splicing introns. Another possibility is that lncRNAs could have structured protein-binding sites arranged in a decentralized scaffold, lacking a compact core. A third hypothesis posits that lncRNAs might exhibit a largely unstructured architecture, with loosely organized protein-binding domains interspersed with long regions of disordered single-stranded RNA.

Studying the tertiary structure of lncRNAs by conventional methods such as X- ray crystallography, cryo-EM and nuclear magnetic resonance (NMR) is hampered by their size and conformational dynamics, and by the fact that for now we still know little about their mechanism to reconstruct stable and functionally-active lncRNA-ribonucleoprotein complexes. But some pioneering studies, showed that lncRNAs can already be studied by low-resolution single-particle and in-solution methods, such as atomic force microscopy (AFM) and small-angle X-ray scattering (SAXS), in some cases even in complexes with small molecule modulators.

For instance, lncRNA MEG3 was shown to regulate transcription factor p53 thanks to its compact structured core. Moreover, lncRNA Braveheart (Bvht) was shown to have a well-defined, albeit flexible 3D structure that is remodeled upon binding CNBP (Cellular Nucleic-acid Binding Protein) which recognizes distal domains in the RNA. Finally, Xist a master regulator of X chromosome inactivation was shown to specifically bind a small molecule compound, which alters the conformation of Xist RepA motif and displaces two known interacting protein factors (PRC2 and SPEN) from the RNA. By such mechanism of action, the compound abrogates the initiation of X-chromosome inactivation.

== See also ==
- List of long non-coding RNA databases
- NONCODE
- Pinc
- Sphinx (gene)
- VIS1
- ZNRD1-AS1
- Noncoding RNA activated by DNA damage
