= Skewed X-inactivation =

Inactivation of one parent's X chromosome more so than the other's

Skewed X-chromosome inactivation (skewed X-inactivation) occurs when the X-inactivation of one X chromosome is favored over the other, leading to an uneven number of cells with each chromosome inactivated. It is usually defined as one allele being found on the active X chromosome in over 75% of cells, and extreme skewing is when over 90% of cells have inactivated the same X chromosome. It can be caused by primary nonrandom inactivation, either by chance due to a small cell pool or directed by genes, or by secondary nonrandom inactivation, which occurs by selection.

X-chromosome inactivation occurs in females to provide dosage compensation between the sexes. If females kept both X chromosomes active, they would have twice the number of active X genes than males, who only have one copy of the X chromosome. At approximately the time of embryonic implantation, one of the two X chromosomes in each cell of the female embryo is randomly selected for inactivation. Cells then undergo transcriptional and epigenetic changes to ensure this inactivation is permanent (such as methylation and being modified into Barr bodies). All progeny from these initial cells will maintain the inactivation of the same chromosome, resulting in a phenotypic mosaic pattern of cells in females although not a genotypic mosaic.

Most females will have some levels of skewing. It is relatively common in adult females; around 35% of women have a skewed ratio over 70:30, and 7% of women have an extreme skewed ratio of over 90:10. This is of medical significance, due to the potential for the expression of disease genes present on the X chromosome that are normally not expressed due to random X-inactivation.

== Causes ==
=== Primary nonrandom inactivation ===
Nonrandom X-inactivation leads to skewed X-inactivation. Nonrandom X-inactivation can be caused by chance or directed by genes. If the initial pool of cells in which X-inactivation occurs is small, chance can cause skewing to occur in some individuals by causing a bigger proportion of the initial cell pool to inactivate one X chromosome. A reduction in the size of this initial cell pool would increase the likelihood of skewing occurring. This skewing can then be inherited by progeny cells, or increased by secondary selection.

The X-chromosome controlling element (Xce) gene in mice has been found to influence genetically mediated skewing. It is unknown whether a similar gene plays a role in human X-inactivation, although a 2008 study found that skewing in humans is mostly caused by secondary events rather than a genetic tendency.

There is a much higher concordance rate in genetically identical (monozygotic) twins compared to non-identical (dizygotic) twins, which suggests a strong genetic input. A 10% difference in the skewing of genetically identical twins did exist however, so there are other contributing factors outside of genetics alone. It is difficult to identify primary nonrandom inactivation in humans, as early cell selection occurs in the embryo. Mutation and imprinting of the XIST gene, a part of the X-inactivation centre, can result in skewing. This is rare in humans.

==== Xce ====
Skewed X-inactivation in mice is controlled by the Xce gene on the X chromosome. Xce acts in cis, which means that it acts upon the chromosome from which it was transcribed. There are four alleles of Xce, labeled a, b, c, and d. Each allele has a different likelihood of inactivation, with a < b < c < d, where d is the most likely to remain active and a is the least likely. The strength differences between the four alleles are likely due to variations in the number of binding sites for a crucial actor in inactivation. The specific transfactor is not known currently.

Homozygotic mouse cells will have roughly even levels of inactivation due to both alleles having equal chance of being inactivated. For example, a mouse with the genotype dd will have an inactivation ratio very close to 50:50. Heterozygotes, will experience greater levels of skewing due to the differing inactivation likelihood of the two alleles. A mouse cell with the Xce genotype ad will have a greater number of the a-carrying than d-carrying X chromosomes inactivated, because the d-carrying X chromosome is less likely to be inactivated.

There are two theories on the mechanism Xce uses to affect inactivation. The first is that genomic differences in the Xce alleles alter the sequence of the long non-coding RNA that is an integral part of X chromosome inactivation. The second is that Xce acts as a binding site for dosage factors that will affect XIST gene and Tsix expression (long non-coding RNAs involved in X chromosome inactivation).

==== Parent-of-origin ====
Skewing can also be influenced by the parent-of-origin effect, in which skewing becomes biased towards either the maternal or paternal X chromosome. Studies have suggested an X-linked gene or genes that control this effect, but the exact gene has not yet been identified.

A 2010 study found a small but significant under-expression of the paternal X chromosome in mice. Extra-embryonic tissues are found to preferentially inactivate the paternal X chromosome. Marsupials will always inactivate the paternal X chromosome, in a process named imprinting. Researchers hypothesized a link between the slight preference for inactivation of the paternal X in mice tissue, and the preference in extra-embryonic tissue and Marsupials. There may be a conserved epigenetic mark that drives this preference.

==== Promoter mutations ====
Skewed inactivation patterns can also emerge due to mutations that change the quantity of guanine on the Xist promoter. The Xist gene is responsible for inactivating the X chromosome from which it is transcribed. X-chromosome inactivation in general is influenced by the number of guanine-containing nucleotides on the Xist promoter, although generally inactivation still follows a random pattern. A rare mutation can occur, however, in which a cytosine residue is converted to guanine on the Xist promoter. It has been hypothesized that the mutation causes a change in the Xist transcript or in the levels of transcript produced, which causes the cell to differentiate between the two X chromosomes and causes the chromosome with the mutation to become preferentially inactivated. The mechanism has not been fully elucidated at this time, although research does point towards decreased promoter activity as a result of the mutation being a major part of the process.

=== Secondary skewing ===
Secondary skewing occurs when an X-linked mutation affects cell proliferation or survival. If a mutation on one X chromosome negatively affects a cell's ability to proliferate or survive, there will end up being a larger proportion of cells with the other X chromosome active. This selection of one X chromosome can vary between tissue types, as it depends on the specific gene and its activity in the tissue, with rapidly dividing cells giving selection processes more time to work. Blood cells, for example, tend to have the highest rates of skewing due to the extremely high dividing and replacement rate within the human body. The strength of selection can also vary depending on the gene under selection, and so skewing can occur at different rates and to different extents.

Secondary selection tends to cause an increase in skewing with age. This is primarily due to a longer span over which selective pressure has room in which to act. Skewing is still seen in young children, but with a lower frequency and at less extreme levels in most cases.

== Clinical significance ==
Skewed X-inactivation has medical significance due to its impacts on X-linked diseases. X-chromosome skewing has an ability to amplify diseases on the X chromosome. In wild type women, recessive diseases on the X chromosome are often unexpressed due to the roughly even inactivation process, which prevents mutated alleles from becoming heavily expressed. However, skewed inactivation can lead to a more severe expression of the disease.

The diseased X-linked allele can also cause strong selection in a heterozygote for the cells with the diseased allele on the inactive chromosome. Therefore, strong skewing in female members of a family can suggest they are carriers of an X-linked disease.

=== Cancer predisposition ===
Skewed X-inactivation has also been found to correlate with a higher rate of ovarian cancer, although the mechanism behind this is unknown. A 2013 study also found skewed X-inactivation to be a factor that predisposes individuals to esophageal carcinomas. It has been postulated that skewed X-inactivation might lead to a decrease in the expression of X-linked tumor suppressor genes in an individual who also has a germline mutation in the expressed chromosome. This would cause the gene on that chromosome to become under-expressed, making it more difficult for cells to regulate themselves properly. Other researchers have contended that such a mutation would lead to higher rates of cancer among wild type females, as approximately half the cells would not express the gene due to random inactivation. One would also see a higher rate of cancer in males with the mutation. Instead, the researchers proposed that the cause of cancer and skewed inactivation could potentially be separate events, or both be caused by an unknown source.

=== Rett syndrome ===
Rett syndrome is a genetic disorder caused by a mutation of the MECP2 gene on the X chromosome. The disease occurs mostly in females and involves repetitive hand movements, frequent seizures and a loss of vocal skills and sometimes motor skills. Females with one copy of the mutated allele show symptoms of severe intellectual disability. Asymptomatic carriers and patients with very mild symptoms have been described, who can show skewed X-inactivation that favors the inactivation of the mutated allele. Asymptomatic carriers can pass on the mutated allele to their daughters, who can show full symptoms if skewing does not occur. Most Rett syndrome cases show no skewing.

=== Autoimmunity ===
Skewed X-inactivation has been correlated with several autoimmune diseases, including autoimmune thyroid disease (ATD) and scleroderma. Autoimmune thyroid disease is a disease involving the thyroid gland. The immune system of those who have the condition recognize the thyroid as foreign and attack it, causing it to atrophy. Women have a predisposition towards the condition, and research indicates that this might in part be due to skewed X-inactivation. It was discovered that when twins with the disease were examined, the prevalence of skewing was above 30% as compared to 11% in the control group of wild type women, indicating that X-chromosome skewing could possibly be involved in the cause of the condition. Similar results have also been witnessed in scleroderma, which involves hardening of the skin and inner organs. Skewing levels were found in 64% of informative patients, as compared to only 8% of the control group, also indicating a strong correlation and possible cause. The mechanism behind both conditions is unclear at this time.

=== Autism ===
Higher levels of skewed X chromosome inactivation have been correlated with cases of autism in women. 33% of autistic women in a study had extreme levels of skewing, with only 11% of the wild type control having extreme levels of skewing. The study also revealed that the mothers of the autistic daughters with skewing also had significant levels of skewing, indicating a higher level of heritability as compared to the wild type population. The reason behind this is currently unknown, as no mutations in the Xist promoter were detected.

=== Klinefelter syndrome ===
Klinefelter 47,XXY and 48,XXYY patients were found to have significantly skewed X-chromosome levels in 31% of the patients examined, with researchers predicting that this skewing might be responsible for the mental deficiencies and abnormalities present. Different forms of the disease also showed preferential activation towards either the maternal or paternal X chromosome. This might indicate that parent-of-origin effects such as imprinting might be involved with the X-chromosome skewing.

=== Metabolism ===
X-linked glycogen storage disease (GSD IXa) is a metabolic disorder typically only seen in males because of the X-linked inheritance pattern. Since women are mosaic models when it comes to gene expression, they tend to mask X-linked mutations by using the other X to compensate. Skewed X-inactivation resulting in the expression of the defective X chromosome can cause X-linked mutations to be expressed in women.

The problem occurring in IXa is a defect in phosphorylase b kinase (PHK). PHK activates glycogen phosphorylase, which is a key enzyme to mobilize glucose from stored glycogen, through phosphorylation. Glycogen is the polymer storage unit of glucose in the body. When the body requires energy it can use enzymes such as PHK to break down the glycogen into glucose for the body to use. Some symptoms of the disease are altered blood glucose levels, ketoacidosis, growth retardation, or liver distention.

=== Recurrent miscarriages ===
Skewed X-chromosome inactivation has been implicated in miscarriages in the past. Recurrent pregnancy loss can be defined as either two or three consecutive lost pregnancies within five months. In most cases, the loss of pregnancy can be attributed to genetic, hormonal, anatomical and immunological problems. However, there are still about 50% of cases without a known cause. A study hypothesized that skewed X-inactivation may play a role in these miscarriages. However, a 2003 study found that there was no significant correlation between miscarriages and skewed X-inactivation, with only 6.6% of the patients showing significant skewing as compared to the 3.9% rate in the control group. It also stated that there had been a lack of controlling for age-related skewing in similar studies and concluded that it is unlikely for skewed X-inactivation to influence recurrent miscarriages.

== Studying skewed X-inactivation ==
To study skewed X chromosome inactivation, there must be a detectable difference between the two parental chromosomes. This difference, or polymorphism, will allow detection of which chromosome is active in the cell, so an inactivation ratio can be determined. Often, the methylation levels of the inactive DNA are detected in order to identify the inactive chromosome. Loci that are known to be polymorphic within the human population are selected. Assays that detect the methylation level of the highly polymorphic CAG trinucleotide at the 5' end of the androgen receptor gene are often used in skewed X-inactivation studies. Other loci used include phosphoglycerate kinase, hypoxanthine phosphoribosyl transferase and the DXS255 locus. If these loci contain heavy methylation, it indicates the chromosome is inactive.

At the turn of the 21st century, ratio detection moved to more direct methods by using mRNA or protein levels, and whole exome sequencing. With the exception of escaped genes, only the active X chromosome will transcribe mRNA and produce protein. The exome sequencing provides a dataset that shows target sequences, giving an indication of disease-related protein coding regions. mRNA sequencing is then used on these regions to focus on the X chromosome and find single nucleotide polymorphisms (SNP) that are associated with the disease. These SNPs are genotyped and traced to parental contributor to calculate the ratio of inactivation, based on how much genetic information each parent donated and how much of each parental allele is expressed. These levels of expression may give greater insight to the fundamental cause of the diseases seen from skewed X-inactivation.

=== Potential problems ===
There are several factors which must be taken into account when studying skewed X-inactivation. Escaped genes are ones found on the inactive X chromosome but are still expressed; this particular gene will be expressed from both chromosomes. It is estimated that 25% of the genes escape inactivation. Genes used to study skewing must be carefully selected to ensure they do not escape inactivation, as they will not show any skewed pattern.

A skewed pattern might be more common in affected females than unaffected. This must be considered when studying X-linked diseases. Due to the random nature of inactivation, women can have skewed inactivation due to simple statistical probability. This makes it difficult to determine when the ratio is abnormally skewed. Additionally, skewed activation can also be localized to specific cell lineages. For example, one woman might have skewed activation in her T cells but not the B cells, which in turn necessitates deep analysis work and adequate control of cell lines to ensure proper diagnosis.
