= FTX (disambiguation) =

FTX is a defunct cryptocurrency exchange platform that operated from 2019 to 2022.

FTX may also refer to:

- Fault-Tolerant UNIX, a Stratus Technologies operating system
- Field training exercise, a type of military exercise
- FtX (gender), a gender identity in Japan for nonbinary people born female
- Ftx (gene), a non-coding RNA gene in humans
- FTX Arena, a former name of Kaseya Center
- FTX Games, an American video game publisher
- Owando Airport (IATA code: FTX), an airport in the Republic of Congo
- Toyota FTX, a concept truck

== See also ==
- FXT (disambiguation)
