= JPX =

JPX may refer to:

- JPX (Brazilian company), a defunct vehicle manufacturer
- Jpx (gene)
- Japonic languages
- Japan Exchange Group
- JPEG 2000, an image format
- JPX, a model of Music Man guitar
