= X-chromosome reactivation =

Biological process where inactive X chromosomes are reactivated

X chromosome reactivation (XCR) is the process by which the inactive X chromosome (the Xi) is re-activated in the cells of eutherian female mammals. Therian female mammalian cells have two X chromosomes, while males have only one, requiring X-chromosome inactivation (XCI) for sex-chromosome dosage compensation. In eutherians, XCI is the random inactivation of one of the X chromosomes, silencing its expression. Much of the scientific knowledge currently known about XCR comes from research limited to mouse models or stem cells.

Partial XCR may derepress one or more genes on the Xi, and the level of restored gene expression may not be as high as it would normally be on the active X chromosome (the Xa). Complete XCR restores the Xi to Xa and erases the epigenetic memory of XCI, meaning that inducing X-inactivation again will randomly select an X chromosome to silence, rather than deterministically silencing the original Xi.

XCR is an emerging topic of interest for multiple reasons:

1. Reactivating silenced genes may be a therapy for X-linked diseases in heterozygous females, such as Rett syndrome, or a therapy for cancer by reactivating silenced tumor suppressor genes
2. XCR may be a contributing factor to human disorders, such as certain cancers
3. Understanding the mechanisms of XCR will elucidate general gene regulation principles, contributing to the study of gene silencing, epigenetic memory, and the role of long non-coding RNAs (lncRNAs)

== History ==
=== History of X-inactivation ===
In 1959, Susumu Ohno showed that the two X chromosomes of mammals were different: one appeared similar to the autosomes; the other was condensed and heterochromatic. This finding suggested, independently to two groups of investigators, that one of the X chromosomes underwent inactivation.

In 1961, Mary Lyon proposed the random inactivation of one female X chromosome to explain the mottled phenotype of female mice heterozygous for coat color genes. The Lyon hypothesis also accounted for the findings that one copy of the X chromosome in female cells was highly condensed, and that mice with only one copy of the X chromosome developed as infertile females. This suggested to Ernest Beutler, studying heterozygous females for glucose-6-phosphate dehydrogenase (G6PD) deficiency, that there were two red cell populations of erythrocytes in such heterozygotes: deficient cells and normal cells, depending on whether the inactivated X chromosome (in the nucleus of the red cell's precursor cell) contains the normal or defective G6PD allele.

=== History of X-reactivation ===
Early in the study of XCI in early embryonic development, the original state of the two X chromosomes and the mechanism by which they differentiated into the Xa and Xi was unknown. One hypothesis was that the chromosomes were inactive until one was activated. The other, favored hypothesis that was eventually validated was that both maternal and paternal X chromosomes are active until some mechanism inactivates one chromosome.

As early as 1981, the concept of X reactivation appears in the literature, with a paper on induced XCR in somatic cell hybrid clones by 5-azacitidine treatment, and a paper on XCR in mouse oocytes.

Experiments originally showed that eliminating the X-inactive specific transcript (Xist) gene, a gene that encodes a lncRNA that mediates XCI, in post-XCI somatic cells did not result in detectable Xi reactivation. Therefore, it was believed that XCI, once established in somatic cells, was irreversible and that Xist, while required to initiate XCI, was not required to sustain it. However, newer investigations using modern technologies have found evidence that Xist RNA is involved in the maintenance of XCI. For example, Zhang, et al. found that "Deleting Xist results in a loss of nucleolar association and an inability to maintain Xi heterochromatin, leading to Xi reactivation at the single gene level."

Unlike XCI, XCR lacks an appropriate in vitro system for study, limiting current research to mouse embryos and in vitro stem cell reprogramming.

== Biological Occurrences ==
=== During Development ===
In mice, Xi reactivation is known to occur in three developmental stages:

1. In the oocyte after fertilization, the paternal X chromosome is reactivated, reversing male meiotic sex chromosome inactivation (MSCI).
2. In the inner cell mass (ICM) of the epiblast after imprinted XCI in preimplantation development, the Xi is reactivated.
3. In migrating primordial germ cells (PGCs), Xi reactivation establishes two Xa's in female germ cells before oogenesis. Unlike the other two, here genomic imprinting is erased.

In the inner cell mass (the embryo proper) of mice, XCI occurs randomly, while in the extra-embryonic tissues, imprinted XCI deterministically inactivates the paternal X. In early mouse embryos, the paternal X chromosome is already partially silenced at the zygote stage by imprinted XCI, suggesting that sex-chromosome dosage compensation exists from conception. Following re-activation of the paternal X in the ICM, complete and random XCI occurs post-implantation.

Regarding female mouse germ cells, mature mammalian oocytes were observed to have two active X chromosomes by studies that recorded twice the expression levels from the oocytes from XX female mice as opposed to XO mice in the 1960s. To determine whether XCI never occurred in these cells, or if the Xi was reactivated post-XCI, Kratzer and Chapman found that oogonia have an Xi and an Xa, but the Xi is gradually reactivated shortly before entering the meiotic cycle on the eleventh day.

In human development, X chromosome reactivation also occurs in PGCs. In the ICM of human embryos, however, X reactivation does not occur, because humans do not have imprinted XCI, so XCI has yet to happen in this stage of development.

=== In Cancer ===
Because only one X chromosome is expressed, genetic mutations that lead to cancer are dominant when they occur on the Xa, and silent on the Xi. Increased dosage of X-linked genes, by whole or partial replication of the Xa or by whole or partial loss of XCI, is linked to oncogenesis. Translocations between the Xi and autosomal chromosomes can result in the silencing of autosomal tumor suppressors or reactivation of X-linked oncogenes. X-linked genes may escape inactivation, which potential oncogenic consequences. Impaired XCI and skewed X-inactivation may also be associated with oncogenesis.

Gain of an X chromosome, Klinefelter syndrome, and XX male syndrome are risk factors linked to male breast cancer. In females, there is no evidence that trisomy X or tetrasomy X females are at higher risk of cancer.

Breast cancer and ovarian cancer, particularly more aggressive strains, commonly lack an Xi and have two Xa's. Breast cancer cells commonly have two identical Xa's, possibly from duplication of the original Xa and loss of the original Xi. Gains of X chromosomes have been observed in many other cancers, including leukemia, prostate cancer, and intracranial germ cell cancers. Potential mechanisms leading to this overexpression of X-linked genes include chromosome segregation errors, defects in general heterochromatin maintenance, and defects in Xi-specific silencing factors, the latter two of which would partially reactivate the Xi.

=== In Stem Cell Reprogramming ===
The presence of two Xa's is a measure of the pluripotency, or ability to differentiate into many different cell types, of embryonic stem cells. Cell hybrid experiments fusing somatic cells and stem cells in vitro resulted in reactivation of the entire Xi. Reprogramming of mouse and human fibroblast cells to induced pluripotent stem cells (iPSCs) reactivates the Xi found in the original fibroblasts. If re-differentiated and XCI occurs again, the selection of the Xi is not randomized, i.e. the X that was originally the Xi in the starting fibroblast will be deterministically inactivated again, evidencing the incompleteness of X reactivation. Reprogramming can be accomplished by nuclear cloning, cell fusion with pluripotent cells, or expression of pluripotency factors. Factors implicated in XCI maintenance include origin recognition complex 2 (Orc2), heterochromatin protein 1 (HP1a), macroH2A1, and Bmil. Disruption of Orc2 or HP1a function have both been shown to lead to partial Xi reactivation.

== Mechanism ==
The mechanisms of Xi reactivation remains unknown, including whether they share a common pathway or if different contexts leverage completely different pathways. For XCR to be repressed, silencing of Xist expression is required but not sufficient. The erasure of chromatin modifications that maintain the heterochromatin of the Xi significantly contributes to XCR. H3K27me3, macroH2A, and their associated mechanisms of DNA methylation and histone deacetylation, act as a barriers to XCR in the ICM. Deleting Xist RNA, demethylating DNA, and inhibiting histone hypoacetylation together increases reactivation in primary mouse embryonic fibroblasts on the gene level in a stochastic manner.

X reactivation can be induced and tolerated in mouse extra-embryonic tissues. For example, a mutation of the Polycomb protein EED leads to a lack of Xist RNA coating on the Xi and X reactivation in differentiated trophoblast stem cells.

Xist repression in XCR is induced by Tsix RNA. Tsix deletion appears to decrease the efficiency of XCR in the ICM in vivo, but not in iPSC reprogramming.

=== Timing of Gene Expression ===
Studies have elucidated some of the progression of XCR in the reversal of imprinted XCI in the mouse ICM, of random XCI in iPSC reprogramming, and in germ cell development. XCR proceeds gradually, with sets of genes regaining expression at the early, mid, or late stage of XCR. At the initiation of X reactivation, early genes are transcriptionally activated and Xist repression starts. The reactivation of these early genes happens before complete Xist silencing, suggesting the latter is not necessary for the reactivation of some genes. As XCR progresses, intermediate and late genes are transcriptionally activated, Xist RNA is lost, H3K27me3 is lost, and Tsix is reactivated. During this process, in genome topology there may possibly be acquisition of topologically associating domains (TADs), which are units of genome organization in 3D space, and loss of mega-domains. At completion, there is complete transcriptional reactivation of genes on the Xi, loss of epigenetic memory, DNA hypomethylation, fully established TADs, and if XCI is re-instated, the choice of Xi will be random.

== As a Potential Therapy ==
The human X chromosome contains a disproportionate number of genes associated with intellectual disability. X-linked disorders in heterozygous female patients are particularly relevant here because these patients carry an X chromosome with the mutated disorder allele and an X chromosome with a healthy wild-type allele. XCI randomly selects one X chromosome as the Xi, leaving the genes on the other X, the Xa, to be expressed. Therefore, heterozygous female patients are a mosaic of healthy and diseased cells. In non-cell-autonomous X-linked disorders, such as hemophilia A, the healthy cells can compensate for the diseased cells. In other disorders such as Kabuki syndrome, the mutation affects the cell such that cells carrying the healthy allele are more common (a skewed XCI pattern), reducing the severity of the disease. However, in X-linked disorders where the healthy cells are insufficient to restore wild-type function, X chromosome reactivation may be a potential therapy. By reactivating the Xi in diseased cells, the previously unexpressed wild-type allele can regain some level of expression and restore function. Disorders that could hypothetically be treated by X reactivation include Rett syndrome, CDKL5 deficiency disorder, Fragile X syndrome, etc.

=== Potential Risks and Concerns ===
XCI serves a central function in sex-chromosome dosage compensation. Xi reactivation currently doesn't target specific genes, but rather targets the entire chromosome, running the risk of overexpression of other X-linked genes and subsequent side effects. Treatments also may not be able to specifically target the Xi chromosome, instead causing genome-wide disruption of epigenetic patterns.

XCI is essential for early embryonic development. For example, female mouse embryos that inherited a paternal germline Xist deletion had trophoblast cells where both X chromosomes were fully expressed, resulting in a lethal phenotype. Pre-XCI Xist deletion in mouse zygotes can be tolerated to the extent that the embryos can be carried to term, but none survive past weaning as a result of issues with organ development. However, these concerns may be mitigated by the fact that applications of X reactivation are more focused on post-XCI cells, past the early developmental stages.

Xi loss or Xi reactivation is associated with certain cancers. Xist deletion in the blood compartment of mice has been shown to cause hematologic cancers, suggesting an important role for Xist RNA and for XCI in cancer suppression. In addition, while Xist deletion can be tolerated in the epithelial cells and the gut, the mouse becomes more susceptible to stress-induced gut cancer, suggesting Xist and XCI are protective against chronic stress. Xist deletion in mouse brains have seen no negative effects in some studies. The variation among organs and cell-types for tolerance of partial X reactivation currently appears to recommend a local approach targeting individual organs for X reactivation. For example, in neurodevelopmental disorders, X reactivation may be targeted to the brain and central nervous system.

=== Research ===
In developing a treatment to reactivate the Xi, screens to identify single factors that inhibit XCI have listed many potential pharmacological targets to consider for further study. However, XCI is complex and maintained by a diverse set of proteins and multiple mechanisms, such as DNA methylation, histone hypoacetylation, and the role of Xist RNA. More effective X reactivation may require a synergistic combination of factors, and studies have considered combinations of decitabine with Aurora kinase inhibitors, Xist antisense oligonucleotides (ASOs), and DNA TOP2A/TOP2B knockdown. Some experimental synergistic combinations of drugs have outperformed any single factor for levels of X reactivation.
