= Carolyn J. Brown =

Canadian geneticist

- Education: University of Guelph, BA; University of Toronto, PhD; Stanford University, PhD
- Scientific career
- Fields: Human Genetics, Epigenetics, X-inactivation
- Academic advisors: Hunt Willard
- Website: Lab webpage University webpage

Carolyn J. Brown (born in 1961, Ontario) is a Canadian geneticist and Professor in the Department of Medical Genetics at the University of British Columbia. Brown is known for her studies on X-chromosome inactivation, having discovered the human XIST gene in 1990.

== Education and early career ==
Brown received her Bachelor of Science in Genetics in 1983 from the University of Guelph, Ontario. She started her PhD thesis work at the University of Toronto in 1983, under the supervision of Hunt Willard, and concluded it at Stanford University, following the moving of Willard's laboratory in 1989. Brown initiated the studies of the X chromosome in the lab, and her PhD thesis was entitled "Studies of Human X-Chromosome Inactivation". Her work involved the analysis of genes that "escape" X-chromosome inactivation, being expressed from the (otherwise) inactive X chromosome, as well as the molecular characterization of the X-inactivation center, the genetic locus necessary for silencing of the chromosome. These two topics converged in the 1990 discovery of the XIST gene, which localizes to the X-inactivation center and is expressed solely from the inactive X chromosome. This discovery was reported in two papers in Nature in 1991.

Willard has referred to Brown as "the critical individual who transformed the study of X inactivation". Brown became Research Associate in 1990 in the Stanford Department of Genetics, and two years later moved with Willard's laboratory to the Department of Genetics of Case Western Reserve University, Ohio, where she continued studying the XIST long noncoding RNA. Brown became Assistant Professor (1994) and Associate Professor (1999) in the Department of Medical Genetics of the University of British Columbia, in Vancouver, and was promoted to Professor in 2004. She was the Head of the Department from 2011 to 2014. She has supervised over twenty postdoctoral fellows and graduate students in her laboratory.

== Research ==
Brown's research is directed to the X-chromosome inactivation process in humans. Her lab has identified critical differences between mouse and human X-chromosome inactivation, such as the absence of paternal X inactivation in human extraembryonic tissues, the higher proportion of human "escapees" and the identification of different regulatory sequences of human XIST and mouse Xist. Her lab has been cataloging escape genes using both expression and DNA methylation analysis r to determine which genes contribute to sex differences in disease susceptibility, and which regions of DNA are susceptible to, or resistant to, epigenetic gene silencing. Since human embryonic stem cells are epigenetically unstable, Brown and colleagues have developed alternative model systems to study human inactivation, including inducible XIST transgenes in human somatic cells, human somatic cell hybrids retaining the active or the inactive X chromosome, and mouse cells with X-linked transgenes of human DNA. Her lab collaborates with other research groups at the B. C. Children's Hospital and the BC Cancer Agency to investigate the clinical relevance of X-linked inactivation and expression in disease predisposition, cancer progression, and X-linked diseases, chromosome rearrangements and aneuploidies.

== Awards and honors ==
- 1983-1987: NSERC 1967 Centennial Graduate Scholarship
- 1988: Pre-doctoral Basic Science Presentation Award from the American Society of Human Genetics
- 1995-2000: MRC Scholarship
- 1999: Departmental Teaching Award
- 2001: Early Career Scholar, Peter Wall Institute for Advanced Studies, UBC
- 2008: UBC Killam Teaching Prize
- 2018: Canadian College of Medical Genetics Honorary Affiliate
