= XCR =

XCR can stand for:

- Extended Control Register in the x86 architecture
- Robinson Armament XCR, a multi-caliber, gas piston combat rifle
- Vatry Airport in France (IATA code)
- A mountain biking event; see UCI race classifications § Mountain biking
- X-chromosome reactivation, in epigenetics
- Carian language, of ancient south-west Anatolia (ISO 639-3 code: xcr)
