= John Charles Lucchesi =

American geneticist

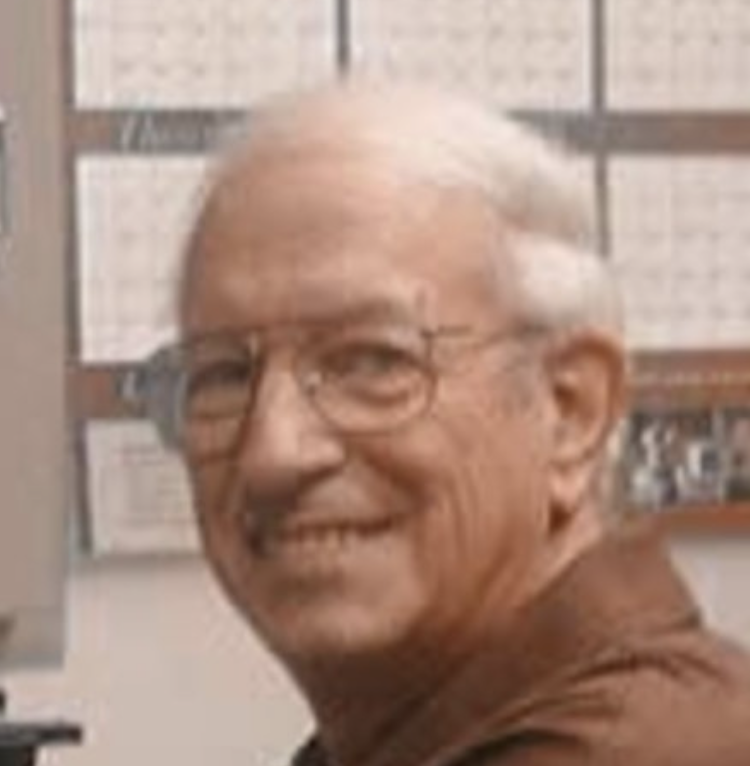
- Born: Cairo, Egypt
- Education: LaGrange College; University of Georgia; University of California, Berkeley
- Known for: Dosage compensation in Drosophila melanogaster; chromatin regulation
- Awards: Fellow of the American Association for the Advancement of Science
- Scientific career
- Fields: Genetics, molecular biology, epigenetics
- Workplaces: University of North Carolina at Chapel Hill; Emory University

John Charles Lucchesi is an American geneticist known for pioneering research on dosage compensation in Drosophila melanogaster and the epigenetic regulation of gene expression. His laboratory identified chromatin remodeling factors important for gene regulation in normal and cancer cells. He is Emeritus Asa Griggs Candler Professor of Biology at Emory University.

== Early life and education ==
Lucchesi was born in Cairo, Egypt. He attended the Lycée Français du Caire before moving to the United States to enroll at LaGrange College in Georgia, where he received an A.B. degree in chemistry in 1955. He earned an M.S. degree from the University of Georgia in 1958 and a Ph.D. in genetics from the University of California, Berkeley in 1963, where he studied under geneticist Curt Stern.

== Career ==
Following postdoctoral training at the University of Oregon with Edward Novitski, Lucchesi joined the faculty of the University of North Carolina at Chapel Hill, where he became Cary C. Boshamer Professor of Biology and Genetics. In 1983, he was named a Fellow of Churchill College, University of Cambridge.

In 1990, he joined the Department of Biology at Emory University as Asa Griggs Candler Professor of Biology and served as department chair.

Lucchesi’s early work focused on chromosome mechanics and recombination. He later became a leading figure in developmental genetics, using dosage compensation in Drosophila as a model system. His research demonstrated that enhanced chromatin accessibility and transcriptional elongation underlie X-chromosome upregulation in males.

== Research impact ==
Lucchesi’s work has significantly influenced understanding of the relationship between dosage compensation, sex determination, and sex chromosome evolution. His contributions to chromatin biology and epigenetic regulation are widely cited in the field.

== Awards and honors ==
- Fellow, American Association for the Advancement of Science (1998)
- President, National Drosophila Board (1993)
- President (1992) and Vice President (1991), Genetics Society of America
- Chair, NIH Genetics Study Section (1987)
- Fellow, Churchill College, University of Cambridge (1983)
- Cary C. Boshamer Professor, University of North Carolina at Chapel Hill (1982)

== Selected works ==
- Lucchesi, J.C. (2019). Epigenetics, Nuclear Organization and Gene Function. Oxford University Press. ISBN 9780198831211.
- Lucchesi, J.C. (2023). Chromatin and Gene Function: A Primer. World Scientific. ISBN 9789811258459.

== See also ==
- Dosage compensation
- Chromatin
- Epigenetics
