= Huntington Willard =

American geneticist

- Born: About 1953
- Education: Harvard University (A.B.), Yale University (Ph.D.)
- Known for: Development of human artificial chromosomes
- Scientific career
- Fields: Genetics
- Institutions: Johns Hopkins University, University of Toronto, Stanford University, Case Western Reserve University, University of Chicago, Duke University Medical Center

Huntington Faxon Willard (born c.1953) is an American geneticist. In 2014, he was named to head the Marine Biological Laboratory, and is a professor in human genetics at the University of Chicago. He stepped down from leading the lab in 2017 to return to research. Willard was elected to the National Academy of Medicine in 2016. Earlier, beginning in 2003 he was the Nanaline H. Duke Professor of Genome Sciences, the first director of the Institute for Genome Sciences and Policy, and Vice Chancellor for Genome Sciences at Duke University Medical Center in Durham, North Carolina.

Willard graduated from the Belmont Hill School in Belmont, Massachusetts in 1971. He received his A.B. degree in biology from Harvard University in 1975 and his Ph.D. from Yale University in 1979. He did a postdoctoral fellowship in medical genetics at Johns Hopkins University from 1979-81.

He then held positions at the University of Toronto from 1982 to 1989, Stanford University from 1989 to 1992, and was Chairman of the Department of Genetics at Case Western Reserve University from 1992 to 2002.

His current research interests include genome sciences and their broad implications for medicine and society, human chromosome structure and function, X-inactivation and mechanisms of gene silencing, and the first reported development of human artificial chromosomes for studies of gene transfer and functional genomics. Studies of the X-chromosome in his laboratory by Carolyn J. Brown led to the discovery of the human XIST gene, the long noncoding RNA associated with the inactive X chromosome.
