= XIST =

Non-coding RNA

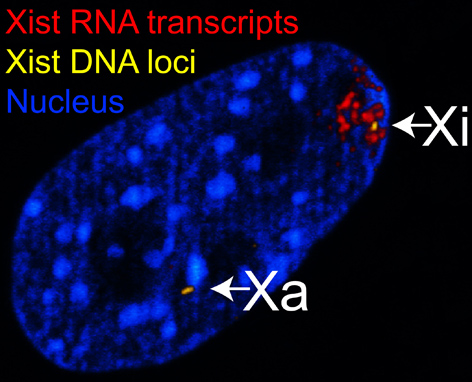

Identifiers
- Aliases: XIST, DXS1089, DXS399E, LINC00001, NCRNA00001, SXI1, swd66, X inactive specific transcript (non-protein coding), X inactive specific transcript, Xist
- External IDs: OMIM: 314670; MGI: 98974; GeneCards: XIST

Gene location (Human)
Chr.	X chromosome (human)
Band	Xq13.2	Start	73,820,649 bp
Band	Xq13.2	End	73,852,723 bp

Gene location (Mouse)
Chr.	X chromosome (mouse)
Band	X D|X 46.15 cM	Start	102,503,972 bp
Band	X D|X 46.15 cM	End	102,526,860 bp
RNA expression pattern
Bgee	Human / Mouse (ortholog); Top expressed in: tibia; skin of hip; mucosa of ileum; right uterine tube; vulva; germinal epithelium; pericardium; epithelium of lactiferous gland; lactiferous duct; left ovary / Top expressed in: epithelium of lens; renal corpuscle; dermis; neural layer of retina; fossa; utricle; condyle; gastrula; sexually immature organism; intercostal muscle; More reference expression data
BioGPS	n/a
Orthologs
Databases	NCBI: entry; OMA: entry
Species	Human	Mouse
Entrez	7503	213742
Ensembl	ENSG00000229807	ENSMUSG00000086503
UniProt	n a	n/a
RefSeq (mRNA)	n/a	n/a
RefSeq (protein)	n/a	n/a
Location (UCSC)	Chr X: 73.82 – 73.85 Mb	Chr X: 102.5 – 102.53 Mb
PubMed search
- Wikidata
View/Edit Human	View/Edit Mouse

Xist (X-inactive specific transcript) is a non-coding RNA transcribed from the X chromosome of the placental mammals that acts as a major effector of the X-inactivation process. It is a component of the Xic – X-chromosome inactivation centre – along with two other RNA genes (Jpx and Ftx) and two protein genes (Tsx and Cnbp2).

The Xist RNA, a large (17 kb in humans) transcript, is expressed on the inactive chromosome and not on the active one. It is processed in a similar way to mRNAs, through splicing and polyadenylation. However, it remains untranslated. It has been suggested that this RNA gene evolved at least partly from a protein-coding gene that became a pseudogene. The inactive X chromosome is coated with this transcript, which is essential for the inactivation. X chromosomes lacking Xist will not be inactivated, while duplication of the Xist gene on another chromosome causes inactivation of that chromosome.

The human Xist gene was discovered by Andrea Ballabio through a cDNA library screening and then characterized in collaboration with Carolyn J. Brown and Hunt Willard.

== Function ==
X-inactivation is an early developmental process in mammalian females that transcriptionally silences one of the pair of X chromosomes, thus providing dosage equivalence between males and females (see dosage compensation). The process is regulated by several factors, including a region of chromosome X called the X-inactivation center (XIC). The XIST gene is expressed exclusively from the XIC of the inactive X chromosome. The transcript is spliced but apparently does not encode a protein. The transcript remains in the nucleus where it coats the inactive X chromosome. Alternatively spliced transcript variants have been identified, but their full length sequences have not been determined.

The functional role of the Xist transcript was definitively demonstrated in mouse female ES cells using a novel antisense technology, called peptide nucleic acid (PNA) interference mapping. In the reported experiments, a single 19-bp antisense cell-permeating PNA targeted against a particular region of Xist RNA prevented the formation of Xi and inhibited cis-silencing of X-linked genes. The association of the Xi with macro-histone H2A is also disturbed by PNA interference mapping. The X-inactivation process occurs in mice even in the absence of this gene via epigenetic regulation, but Xist is required to stabilize this silencing.

In addition to being expressed in nearly all females, XIST is expressed in narrow developmental contexts in males including human preimplantation embryos, primordial germ cells, testicular germ cell tumors, and a subset of male cancers of diverse lineages. It may be involved in the dosage compensation of supernumerary X chromosomes in the latter two cases.

== Gene location ==
The human Xist RNA gene is located on the long (q) arm of the X chromosome. The Xist RNA gene contains conserved repeats within its structure. Its gene product is largely localized in the nucleus. The Xist RNA gene features a conserved A region, which contains 8 repeats separated by U-rich spacers. The A region appears to encode two long stem-loop RNA structures that each include four repeats. An ortholog of the Xist RNA gene in humans has been identified in mice. This ortholog encodes a 15 kb Xist transcript that is also localized in the nucleus. However, the ortholog does not feature conserved repeats. The Xist RNA gene is located within the Xist Inactivation Center (XIC), which plays a major role in X-inactivation.

== Transcript organization ==
=== A region ===
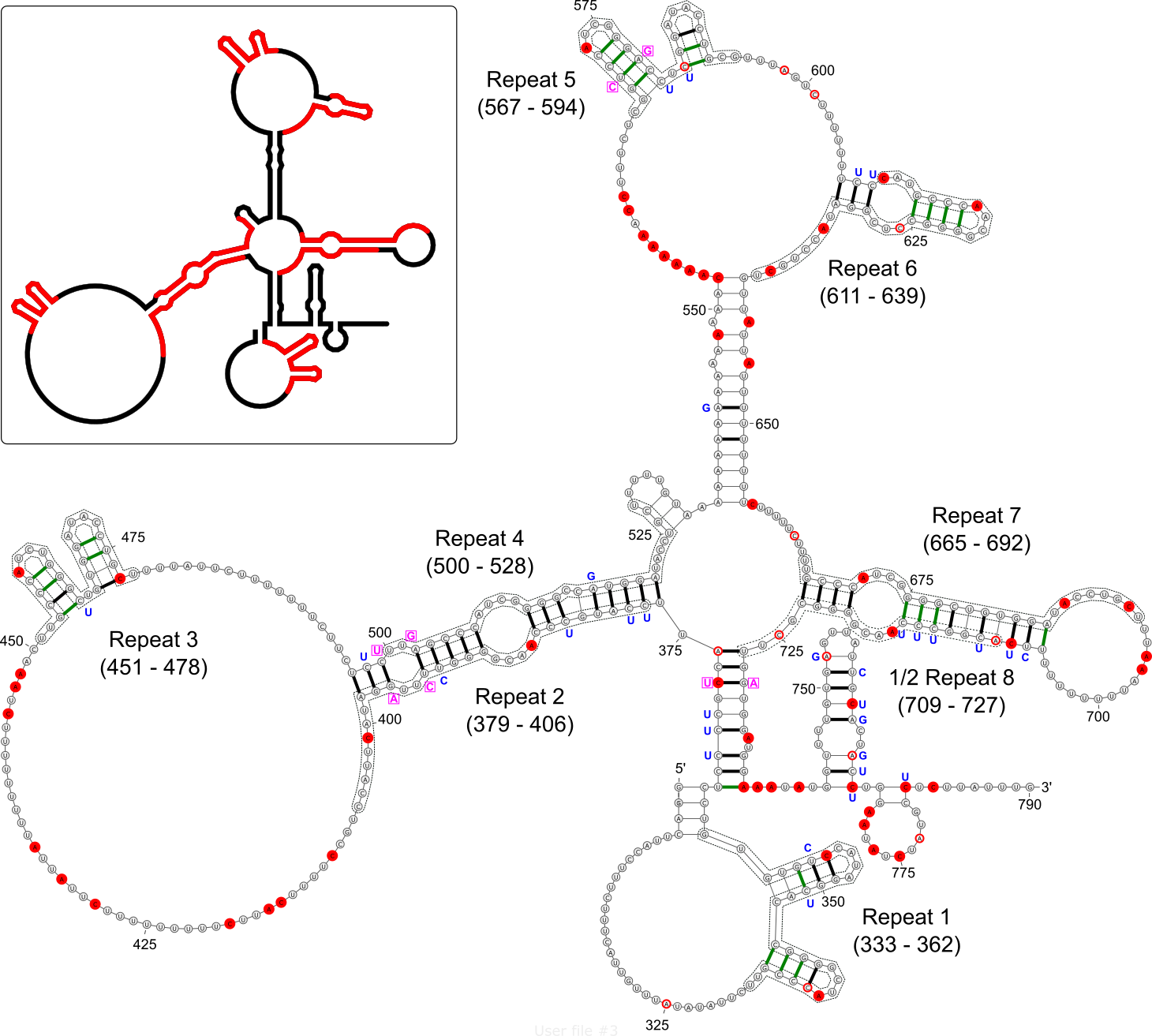
Structure model of the repeat A (repA) region of Xist based on in vivo biochemical structure probing and comparative sequence analysis. Repeats 1 to 8(1/2) are numbered and boxed - they are shown in red on the cartoon of repA in the upper left hand panel. Reactive nucleotides are colored red, where open and closed circles are medium and strongly reactive, respectively (reactivity suggests that a nucleotide is unpaired or loosely structured). Consistent and compensatory mutations (single and double point mutations that preserve pairing) are annotated in blue and purple, respectively. Base pairs that are 100% conserved in rodents are bold and black, while those conserved in rodents and mammals are in green. The data and model are taken from Fang R, Moss WN, Rutenberg-Schoenberg M, Simon MD (December 2015). "Probing Xist RNA Structure in Cells Using Targeted Structure-Seq". PLoS Genetics. 11 (12) e1005668. doi:10.1371/journal.pgen.1005668. PMC 4672913. PMID 26646615..

The Xist RNA contains a region of conservation called the repeat A (repA) region that contains up to nine repeated elements. It was initially suggested that repA repeats could fold back on themselves to form local intra-repeat stem-loop structures. Later work using in vitro biochemical structure probing proposed several inter-repeat stem-loop structures. A recent study using in vivo biochemical probing and comparative sequence analysis proposed a revision of the repA structure model that includes both intra-repeat and inter-repeat folding found in previous models as well as novel features (see Figure). In addition to its agreement with the in vivo data, this revised model is highly conserved in rodents and mammals (including humans) suggesting functional importance for repA structure. Although the exact function of the repA region is uncertain, it was shown that the entire region is needed for efficient binding to the Suz12 protein.

=== C region ===
The Xist RNA directly binds to the inactive X-chromosome through a chromatin binding region of the RNA transcript. The Xist chromatin binding region was first elucidated in female mouse fibroblastic cells. The primary chromatin binding region was shown to localize to the C-repeat region. The chromatin-binding region was functionally mapped and evaluated by using an approach for studying noncoding RNA function in living cells called peptide nucleic acid (PNA) interference mapping. In the reported experiments, a single 19-bp antisense cell-permeating PNA targeted against a particular region of Xist RNA caused the disruption of the Xi. The association of the Xi with macro-histone H2A is also disturbed by PNA interference mapping.

== X-inactivation centre (XIC) ==
The Xist RNA gene lies within the X-inactivation centre (XIC), which plays a major role in Xist expression and X-inactivation. The XIC is located on the q arm of the X chromosome (Xq13). XIC regulates Xist in cis X-inactivation, where Tsix, an antisense of Xist, downregulates the expression of Xist. The Xist promoter of XIC is the master regulator of X-inactivation. X-inactivation plays a key role in dosage compensation.

=== Tsix antisense transcript ===
The Tsix antisense gene is a transcript of the Xist gene at the XIC center. The Tsix antisense transcript acts in cis to repress the transcription of Xist, which negatively regulates its expression. The mechanism behind how Tsix modulates Xist activity in cis is poorly understood; however, there are a few theories on its mechanism. One theory is that Tsix is involved in chromatin modification at the Xist locus and another is that transcription factors of pluripotent cells play a role in Xist repression.

== Regulation of the Xist promoter ==
=== Methylation ===
The Tsix antisense is believed to activate DNA methyl transferases that methylate the Xist promoter, in return resulting in inhibition of the Xist promoter and thus the expression of the Xist gene. In contrast to Tsix acting, which is an inhibitor to Xist, the methylation of histone 3 lysine 4 (H3K4) up regulates the transcription by opening the chromatin structure. The open chromatin enables the recruitment of transcription factors and thus allows for transcription to occur.

=== dsRNA and RNAi ===
A dsRNA and RNAi pathway have been also proposed to play a role in regulation of the Xist Promoter. Dicer is an RNAi enzyme and it is believed to cleave the duplex of Xist and Tsix at the beginning of X-inactivation, to small ~30 nucleotide RNAs, which have been termed xiRNAs, These xiRNAs are believed to be involved in repressing Xist on the probable active X chromosome based upon studies. A study was conducted where normal endogenous Dicer levels were decreased to 5%, which led to an increase in Xist expression in undifferentiated cells, thus supporting the role of xiRNAs in Xist repression. The role and mechanism of xiRNAs is still under examination and debate.

=== Tsix independent mechanisms ===
==== Pluripotent cell transcriptional factors ====
Pluripotent stem cells express transcription factors Nanog, Oct4 and Sox2 that seem to play a role in repressing Xist. In the absence of Tsix in pluripotent cells, Xist is repressed, where a mechanism has been proposed that these transcription factors cause splicing to occur at intron 1 at the binding site of these factors on the Xist gene, which inhibits Xist expression A study was conducted where Nanog or Oct4 transcription factors were depleted in pluripotent cells, which resulted in the upregulation of Xist. From this study, it is proposed that Nanog and Oct4 are involved in the repression of Xist expression.

==== Polycomb repressive complex ====
Polycomb repressive complex 2 (PRC2) consist of a class of polycomb group proteins that are involved in catalyzing the trimethylation of histone H3 on lysine 27 (K27), which results in chromatin repression, and thus leads to transcriptional silencing. Xist RNA recruits polycomb complexes to the inactive X chromosome at the onset of XCI. SUZ12 is a component of the PRC2 and contains a zinc finger domain. The zinc finger domain is believed to bind to the RNA molecule. The PRC2 has been observed to repress Xist expression independent of the Tsix antisense transcript, although the definite mechanism is still not known.

== Dosage compensation ==
X-inactivation plays a key role in dosage compensation mechanisms that allow for equal expression of the X and autosomal chromosomes. Different species have different dosage compensation methods, with all of the methods involving the regulation of an X chromosome from one of the either sexes. Some methods involved in dosage compensation to inactivate one of the X chromosomes from one of the sexes are Tsix antisense gene, DNA methylation and DNA acetylation; however, the definite mechanism of X-inactivation is still poorly understood. If one of the X chromosomes is not inactivated or is partially expressed, it could lead to over expression of the X chromosome and it could be lethal in some cases.

Turner syndrome is one example of where dosage compensation does not equally express the X chromosome, and in females one of the X chromosomes is missing or has abnormalities, which leads to physical abnormalities and also gonadal dysfunction in females due to the one missing or abnormal X chromosome. Turner syndrome is also referred to as a monosomy X condition.

== X-inactivation cycle ==
Xist expression and X-inactivation change throughout embryonic development. In early embryogenesis, the oocyte and sperm do not express Xist and the X chromosome remains active. After fertilization, when the cells are in the 2 to 4 cell stage, Xist transcripts are expressed from X chromosomes (exclusively paternal X chromosomes in mice but not humans) in every cell, causing that X chromosome to become imprinted and inactivated. Some cells develop into pluripotent cells (the inner cell mass) when the blastocyte forms. There, the imprint is removed, leading to the downregulation of Xist and thus reactivation of the inactive X chromosome. Recent data suggests that Xist activity is regulated by an anti-sense transcript. The epiblast cells are then formed and they begin to be differentiated, and the Xist is upregulated from either of the two X chromosomes and at random in ICM, but the Xist is maintained in epiblast, an X is inactivated and the Xist allele is turned off in the active X chromosome. In maturing XX primordial germ cells, Xist is downregulated and X reactivation occurs once again.

== Disease linkage ==
Mutations in the XIST promoter cause familial skewed X-inactivation.

== Interactions ==
XIST has been shown to interact with BRCA1.

== See also ==
- X-inactivation
- Dosage compensation
- Tsix
