= FXT =

FXT may refer to:

- FreeX FXT, a German paraglider
- FXT, an XML transformation tool
