= X-inactivation =

Inactivation of copies of X chromosome

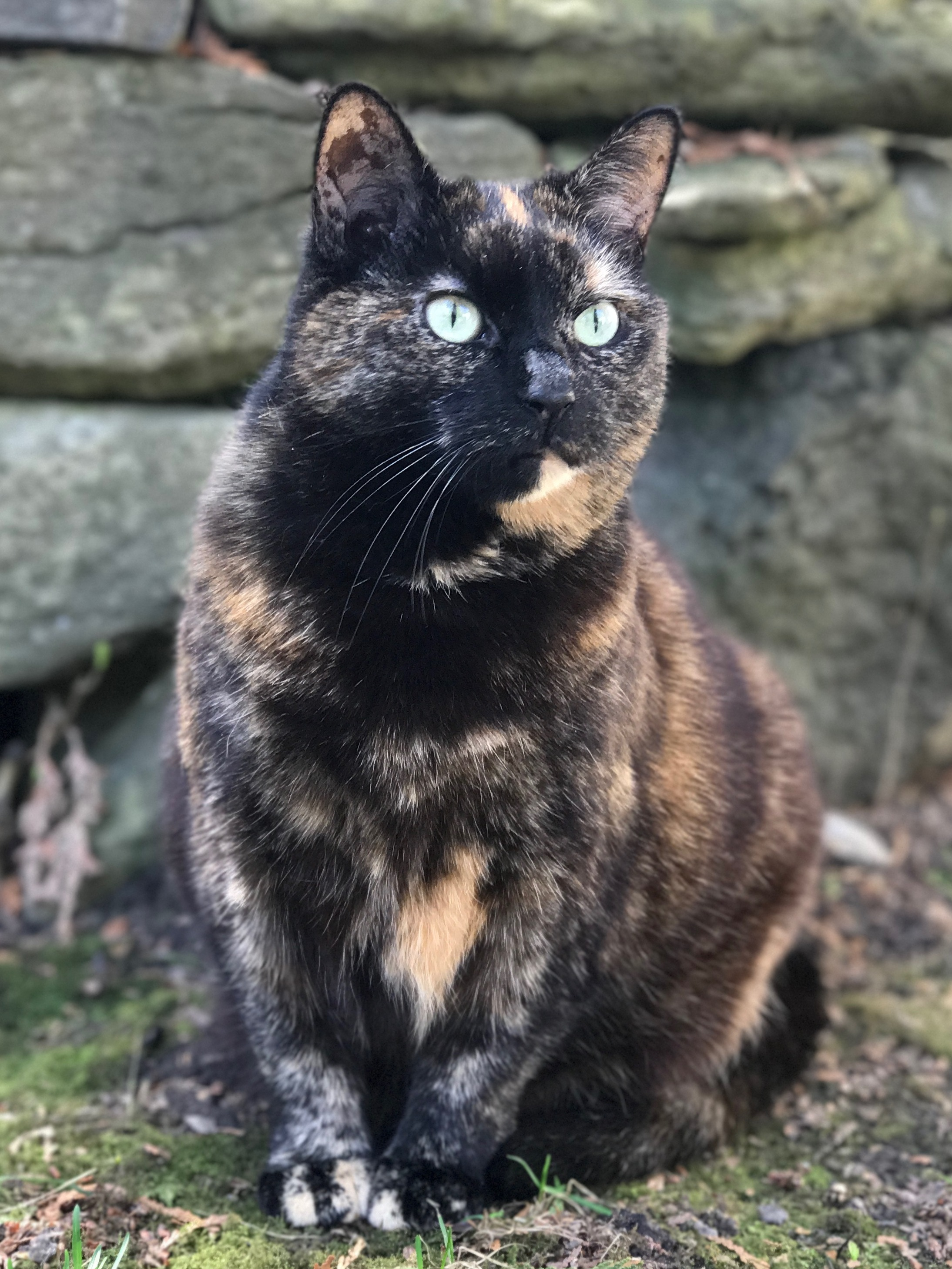
The coloration of tortoiseshell cats is a visible manifestation of X-inactivation. The black and orange alleles of a fur coloration gene reside on the X chromosome. For any given patch of fur, the inactivation of an X chromosome that carries one allele results in the fur color of the other, active allele.

The process and possible outcomes of random X-chromosome inactivation in female human embryonic cells undergoing mitosis. 1.Early stage embryonic cell of a female human 2.Maternal X chromosome 3.Paternal X chromosome 4.Mitosis and random X-chromosome inactivation event 5.Paternal chromosome is randomly inactivated in one daughter cell, maternal chromosome is inactivated in the other 6.Paternal chromosome is randomly inactivated in both daughter cells 7.Maternal chromosome is randomly inactivated in both daughter cells 8.Three possible random combination outcomes

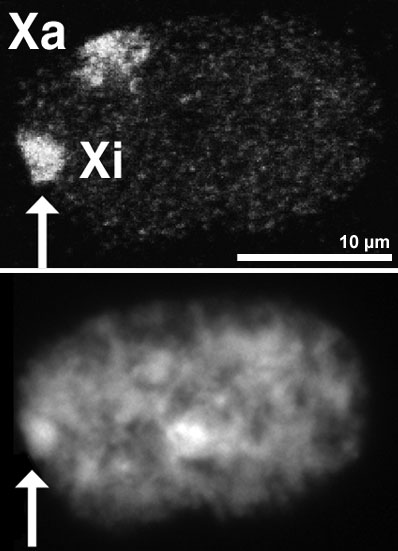
Nucleus of a female cell. Top: Both X-chromosomes are detected, by FISH. Bottom: The same nucleus stained with a DNA stain (DAPI). The Barr body is indicated by the arrow, it identifies the inactive X (Xi).

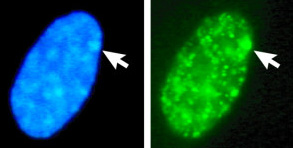
An interphase female human fibroblast cell. Arrows point to sex chromatin on DNA (DAPI) in cell nucleus(left), and to the corresponding X chromatin (right). Left: DNA (DAPI)-stained nucleus. Arrow indicates the location of Barr body(Xi). Right: DNA associated histones protein detected

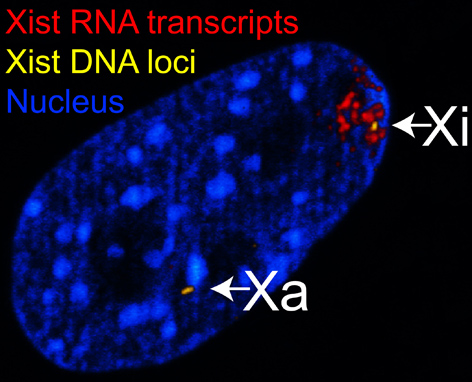
The figure shows confocal microscopy images from a combined RNA-DNA FISH experiment for Xist in fibroblast cells from adult female mouse, demonstrating that Xist RNA is coating only one of the X-chromosomes. RNA FISH signals from Xist RNA are shown in red color, marking the inactive X-chromosome (Xi). DNA FISH signals from Xist loci are shown in yellow color, marking both active and inactive X-chromosomes (Xa, Xi). The nucleus (DAPI-stained) is shown in blue color. The figure is adapted from:.

X-inactivation (also called Lyonization, after English geneticist Mary Lyon) is a process by which one of the copies of the X chromosome is inactivated in therian female mammals. The inactive X chromosome is silenced by being packaged into a transcriptionally inactive structure called heterochromatin. As nearly all female mammals have two X chromosomes, X-inactivation prevents them from having twice as many X chromosome gene products as males, who only possess a single copy of the X chromosome (see dosage compensation).

The choice of which X chromosome will be inactivated in a particular embryonic cell is random in placental mammals such as humans, but once an X chromosome is inactivated it will remain inactive throughout the lifetime of the cell and its descendants in the organism (its cell line). The result is that the choice of inactivated X chromosome in all the cells of the organism is a random distribution, often with about half the cells having the paternal X chromosome inactivated and half with an inactivated maternal X chromosome; but commonly, X-inactivation is unevenly distributed across the cell lines within one organism (skewed X-inactivation).

Unlike the random X-inactivation in placental mammals, inactivation in marsupials applies exclusively to the paternally-derived X chromosome.

== Mechanism ==
=== Cycle of X-chromosome activation in rodents ===
The paragraphs below have to do only with rodents and do not reflect XI in the majority of mammals. X-inactivation is part of the activation cycle of the X chromosome throughout the female life. The egg and the fertilized zygote initially use maternal transcripts, and the whole embryonic genome is silenced until zygotic genome activation. Thereafter, all mouse cells undergo an early, imprinted inactivation of the paternally-derived X chromosome in 4–8 cell stage embryos. The extraembryonic tissues (which give rise to the placenta and other tissues supporting the embryo) retain this early imprinted inactivation, and thus only the maternal X chromosome is active in these tissues.

In the early blastocyst, this initial, imprinted X-inactivation is reversed in the cells of the inner cell mass (which give rise to the embryo), and in these cells both X chromosomes become active again. Each of these cells then independently and randomly inactivates one copy of the X chromosome. This inactivation event is irreversible during the lifetime of the individual, with the exception of the germline. In the female germline before meiotic entry, X-inactivation is reversed, so that after meiosis all haploid oocytes contain a single active X chromosome.

==== Overview ====
The Xi marks the inactive, Xa the active X chromosome. X^{P} denotes the paternal, and X^{M} to denotes the maternal X chromosome. When the egg (carrying X^{M}), is fertilized by a sperm (carrying a Y or an X^{P}) a diploid zygote forms. From zygote, through adult stage, to the next generation of eggs, the X chromosome undergoes the following changes:

1. Xi^{P} Xi^{M} zygote → undergoing zygotic genome activation, leading to:
2. Xa^{P} Xa^{M} → undergoing imprinted (paternal) X-inactivation, leading to:
3. Xi^{P} Xa^{M} → undergoing X-activation in the early blastocyst stage, leading to:
4. Xa^{P} Xa^{M} → undergoing random X-inactivation in the embryonic lineage (inner cell mass) in the blastocyst stage, leading to:
5. Xi^{P} Xa^{M} OR Xa^{P} Xi^{M} → undergoing X-reactivation in primordial germ cells before meiosis, leading to:
6. Xa^{M} Xa^{P} diploid germ cells in meiotic arrest. As the meiosis I only completes with ovulation, human germ cells exist in this stage from the first weeks of development until puberty. The completion of meiosis leads to:
7. Xa^{M} AND Xa^{P} haploid germ cells (eggs).

The X activation cycle has been best studied in mice, but there are multiple studies in humans. As most of the evidence is coming from mice, the above scheme represents the events in mice. The completion of the meiosis is simplified here for clarity. Steps 1–4 can be studied in in vitro fertilized embryos, and in differentiating stem cells; X-reactivation happens in the developing embryo, and subsequent (6–7) steps inside the female body, therefore much harder to study.

===== Timing =====
The timing of each process depends on the species, and in many cases the precise time is actively debated. [The whole part of the human timing of X-inactivation in this table is highly questionable and should be removed until properly substantiated by empirical data]

Approximate timing of major events in the X chromosome activation cycle
	Process	Mouse	Human
1	Zygotic genome activation	2–4 cell stage	2–8 cell stage
2	Imprinted (paternal) X-inactivation	4–8 cell stage	Unclear if it takes place in humans
3	X-activation	Early blastocyst stage	Early blastocyst stage
4	Random X-inactivation in the embryonic lineage (inner cell mass)	Late blastocyst stage	Late blastocyst stage, after implantation
5	X-reactivation in primordial germ cells before meiosis		From before developmental week 4 up to week 14

===== Inheritance of inactivation status across cell generations =====
The descendants of each cell which inactivated a particular X chromosome will also inactivate that same chromosome. This phenomenon, which can be observed in the coloration of tortoiseshell cats when females are heterozygous for the X-linked pigment gene, should not be confused with mosaicism, which is a term that specifically refers to differences in the genotype of various cell populations in the same individual; X-inactivation, which is an epigenetic change that results in a different phenotype, is not a change at the genotypic level. For an individual cell or lineage the inactivation is therefore skewed or 'non-random', and this can give rise to mild symptoms in female 'carriers' of X-linked genetic disorders.

=== Selection of one active X chromosome ===
Typical females possess two X chromosomes, and in any given cell one chromosome will be active (designated as Xa) and one will be inactive (Xi). However, studies of individuals with extra copies of the X chromosome show that in cells with more than two X chromosomes there is still only one Xa, and all the remaining X chromosomes are inactivated. This indicates that the default state of the X chromosome in females is inactivation, but one X chromosome is always selected to remain active.

It is understood that X-chromosome inactivation is a random process, occurring at about the time of gastrulation in the epiblast (cells that will give rise to the embryo). The maternal and paternal X chromosomes have an equal probability of inactivation. This would suggest that women would be expected to suffer from X-linked disorders approximately 50% as often as men (because women have two X chromosomes, while men have only one); however, in actuality, the occurrence of these disorders in females is much lower than that. One explanation for this disparity is that 12–20% of genes on the inactivated X chromosome remain expressed, thus providing women with added protection against defective genes coded by the X-chromosome. Some suggest that this disparity must be evidence of preferential (non-random) inactivation. Preferential inactivation of the paternal X-chromosome occurs in both marsupials and in cell lineages that form the membranes surrounding the embryo, whereas in placental mammals either the maternally or the paternally derived X-chromosome may be inactivated in different cell lines.

The time period for X-chromosome inactivation explains this disparity. Inactivation occurs in the epiblast during gastrulation, which gives rise to the embryo. Inactivation occurs on a cellular level, resulting in a mosaic expression, in which patches of cells have an inactive maternal X-chromosome, while other patches have an inactive paternal X-chromosome. For example, a female heterozygous for haemophilia (an X-linked disease) would have about half of her liver cells functioning properly, which is typically enough to ensure normal blood clotting. Chance could result in significantly more dysfunctional cells; however, such statistical extremes are unlikely. Genetic differences on the chromosome may also render one X-chromosome more likely to undergo inactivation. Also, if one X-chromosome has a mutation hindering its growth or rendering it non viable, cells which randomly inactivated that X will have a selective advantage over cells which randomly inactivated the normal allele. Thus, although inactivation is initially random, cells that inactivate a normal allele (leaving the mutated allele active) will eventually be overgrown and replaced by functionally normal cells in which nearly all have the same X-chromosome activated.

It is hypothesized that there is an autosomally-encoded 'blocking factor' which binds to the X chromosome and prevents its inactivation. The model postulates that there is a limiting blocking factor, so once the available blocking factor molecule binds to one X chromosome the remaining X chromosome(s) are not protected from inactivation. This model is supported by the existence of a single Xa in cells with many X chromosomes and by the existence of two active X chromosomes in cell lines with twice the normal number of autosomes.

Sequences at the X inactivation center (XIC), present on the X chromosome, control the silencing of the X chromosome. The hypothetical blocking factor is predicted to bind to sequences within the XIC.

=== Expression of X-linked disorders in heterozygous females ===
The effect of female X heterozygosity is apparent in some localized traits, such as the unique coat pattern of a tortoiseshell cat. It can be more difficult, however, to fully understand the expression of un-localized traits in these females, such as the expression of disease.

Since males only have one copy of the X chromosome, all expressed X-chromosomal genes (or alleles, in the case of multiple variant forms for a given gene in the population) are located on that copy of the chromosome. Females, however, will primarily express the genes or alleles located on the X-chromosomal copy that remains active. Considering the situation for one gene or multiple genes causing individual differences in a particular phenotype (i.e., causing variation observed in the population for that phenotype), in homozygous females it does not particularly matter which copy of the chromosome is inactivated, as the alleles on both copies are the same. However, in females that are heterozygous at the causal genes, the inactivation of one copy of the chromosome over the other can have a direct impact on their phenotypic value. Because of this phenomenon, there is an observed increase in phenotypic variation in females that are heterozygous at the involved gene or genes than in females that are homozygous at that gene or those genes. There are many different ways in which the phenotypic variation can play out. In many cases, heterozygous females may be asymptomatic or only present minor symptoms of a given disorder, such as with X-linked adrenoleukodystrophy.

The differentiation of phenotype in heterozygous females is furthered by the presence of X-inactivation skewing. Typically, each X-chromosome is silenced in half of the cells, but this process is skewed when preferential inactivation of a chromosome occurs. It is thought that skewing happens either by chance or by a physical characteristic of a chromosome that may cause it to be silenced more or less often, such as an unfavorable mutation.

On average, each X chromosome is inactivated in half of the cells, although 5-20% of women display X-inactivation skewing. In cases where skewing is present, a broad range of symptom expression can occur, resulting in expression varying from minor to severe depending on the skewing proportion. An extreme case of this was seen where monozygotic female twins had extreme variance in expression of Menkes disease (an X-linked disorder) resulting in the death of one twin while the other remained asymptomatic.

It is thought that X-inactivation skewing could be caused by issues in the mechanism that causes inactivation, or by issues in the chromosome itself. However, the link between phenotype and skewing is still being questioned, and should be examined on a case-by-case basis. A study looking at both symptomatic and asymptomatic females who were heterozygous for Duchenne and Becker muscular dystrophies (DMD) found no apparent link between transcript expression and skewed X-Inactivation. The study suggests that both mechanisms are independently regulated, and there are other unknown factors at play.

=== Chromosomal component ===
The X-inactivation center (or simply XIC) on the X chromosome is necessary and sufficient to cause X-inactivation. Chromosomal translocations which place the XIC on an autosome lead to inactivation of the autosome, and X chromosomes lacking the XIC are not inactivated.

The XIC contains four non-translated RNA genes, Xist, Tsix, Jpx and Ftx, which are involved in X-inactivation. The XIC also contains binding sites for both known and unknown regulatory proteins.

=== Xist and Tsix RNAs ===
The X-inactive specific transcript (Xist) gene encodes a large non-coding RNA that is responsible for mediating the specific silencing of the X chromosome from which it is transcribed. The inactive X chromosome is coated by Xist RNA, whereas the Xa is not (See Figure to the right). X chromosomes that lack the Xist gene cannot be inactivated. Artificially placing and expressing the Xist gene on another chromosome leads to silencing of that chromosome.

Prior to inactivation, both X chromosomes weakly express Xist RNA from the Xist gene. During the inactivation process, the future Xa ceases to express Xist, whereas the future Xi dramatically increases Xist RNA production. On the future Xi, the Xist RNA progressively coats the chromosome, spreading out from the XIC; the Xist RNA does not localize to the Xa. The silencing of genes along the Xi occurs soon after coating by Xist RNA.

Like Xist, the Tsix gene encodes a large RNA which is not believed to encode a protein. The Tsix RNA is transcribed antisense to Xist, meaning that the Tsix gene overlaps the Xist gene and is transcribed on the opposite strand of DNA from the Xist gene. Tsix is a negative regulator of Xist; X chromosomes lacking Tsix expression (and thus having high levels of Xist transcription) are inactivated much more frequently than normal chromosomes.

Like Xist, prior to inactivation, both X chromosomes weakly express Tsix RNA from the Tsix gene. Upon the onset of X-inactivation, the future Xi ceases to express Tsix RNA (and increases Xist expression), whereas Xa continues to express Tsix for several days.

Rep A is a long non coding RNA that works with another long non coding RNA, Xist, for X inactivation. Rep A inhibits the function of Tsix, the antisense of Xist, in conjunction with eliminating expression of Xite. It promotes methylation of the Tsix region by attracting PRC2 and thus inactivating one of the X chromosomes.

=== Silencing ===
The inactive X chromosome does not express the majority of its genes, unlike the active X chromosome. This is due to the silencing of the Xi by repressive heterochromatin, which compacts the Xi DNA and prevents the expression of most genes.

Compared to the Xa, the Xi has high levels of DNA methylation, low levels of histone acetylation, low levels of histone H3 lysine-4 methylation, and high levels of histone H3 lysine-9 methylation and H3 lysine-27 methylation mark which is placed by the PRC2 complex recruited by Xist, all of which are associated with gene silencing. PRC2 regulates chromatin compaction and chromatin remodeling in several processes including the DNA damage response. Additionally, a histone variant called macroH2A (H2AFY) is exclusively found on nucleosomes along the Xi.

=== Barr bodies ===
DNA packaged in heterochromatin, such as the Xi, is more condensed than DNA packaged in euchromatin, such as the Xa. The inactive X forms a discrete body within the nucleus called a Barr body. The Barr body is generally located on the periphery of the nucleus, is late replicating within the cell cycle, and, as it contains the Xi, contains heterochromatin modifications and the Xist RNA.

==== Expressed genes on the inactive X chromosome ====
A fraction of the genes along the X chromosome escape inactivation on the Xi. The Xist gene is expressed at high levels on the Xi and is not expressed on the Xa. Many other genes escape inactivation; some are expressed equally from the Xa and Xi, and others, while expressed from both chromosomes, are still predominantly expressed from the Xa. Up to one quarter of genes on the human Xi are capable of escape. Studies in the mouse suggest that in any given cell type, 3% to 15% of genes escape inactivation, and that escaping gene identity varies between tissues.

Many of the genes which escape inactivation are present along regions of the X chromosome which, unlike the majority of the X chromosome, contain genes also present on the Y chromosome. These regions are termed pseudoautosomal regions, as individuals of either sex will receive two copies of every gene in these regions (like an autosome), unlike the majority of genes along the sex chromosomes. Since individuals of either sex will receive two copies of every gene in a pseudoautosomal region, no dosage compensation is needed for females, so it is postulated that these regions of DNA have evolved mechanisms to escape X-inactivation. The genes of pseudoautosomal regions of the Xi do not have the typical modifications of the Xi and have little Xist RNA bound.

The existence of genes along the inactive X which are not silenced explains the defects in humans with atypical numbers of the X chromosome, such as Turner syndrome (X0, caused by SHOX gene) or Klinefelter syndrome (XXY). Theoretically, X-inactivation should eliminate the differences in gene dosage between affected individuals and individuals with a typical chromosome complement. In affected individuals, however, X-inactivation is incomplete and the dosage of these non-silenced genes will differ as they escape X-inactivation, similar to an autosomal aneuploidy.

The precise mechanisms that control escape from X-inactivation are not known, but silenced and escape regions have been shown to have distinct chromatin marks. It has been suggested that escape from X-inactivation might be mediated by expression of long non-coding RNA (lncRNA) within the escaping chromosomal domains.

== Uses in experimental biology ==
Stanley Michael Gartler used X-chromosome inactivation to demonstrate the clonal origin of cancers. Examining normal tissues and tumors from females heterozygous for isoenzymes of the sex-linked G6PD gene demonstrated that tumor cells from such individuals express only one form of G6PD, whereas normal tissues are composed of a nearly equal mixture of cells expressing the two different phenotypes. This pattern suggests that a single cell, and not a population, grows into a cancer. However, this pattern has been proven wrong for many cancer types, suggesting that some cancers may be polyclonal in origin.

Besides, measuring the methylation (inactivation) status of the polymorphic human androgen receptor (HUMARA) located on X-chromosome is considered the most accurate method to assess clonality in female cancer biopsies. A great variety of tumors was tested by this method, some, such as renal cell carcinoma, found monoclonal while others (e.g. mesothelioma) were reported polyclonal.

Researchers have also investigated using X-chromosome inactivation to silence the activity of autosomal chromosomes. For example, Jiang et al. inserted a copy of the Xist gene into one copy of chromosome 21 in stem cells derived from an individual with trisomy 21 (Down syndrome). The inserted Xist gene induces Barr body formation, triggers stable heterochromatin modifications, and silences most of the genes on the extra copy of chromosome 21. In these modified stem cells, the Xist-mediated gene silencing seems to reverse some of the defects associated with Down syndrome.

== History ==
In 1959, Susumu Ohno showed that the two X chromosomes of mammals were different: one appeared similar to the autosomes; the other was condensed and heterochromatic. This finding suggested, independently to two groups of investigators, that one of the X chromosomes underwent inactivation.

In 1961, Mary Lyon proposed the random inactivation of one female X chromosome to explain the mottled phenotype of female mice heterozygous for coat color genes. The Lyon hypothesis also accounted for the findings that one copy of the X chromosome in female cells was highly condensed, and that mice with only one copy of the X chromosome developed as infertile females. This suggested to Ernest Beutler, studying heterozygous females for glucose-6-phosphate dehydrogenase (G6PD) deficiency, that there were two red cell populations of erythrocytes in such heterozygotes: deficient cells and normal cells, depending on whether the inactivated X chromosome (in the nucleus of the red cell's precursor cell) contains the normal or defective G6PD allele.

== See also ==
- Sex-determination system
- Dosage compensation
- Barr body
- Heterochromatin
- Epigenetics
- Skewed X-inactivation
- Calico cat
- Developmental disorders thought to be related to X-inactivation:
  - Early infantile epileptic encephalopathy type 9
  - Frontonasal dysplasia
