= Ftx (gene) =

Genetic element in the species Homo sapiens

THCYTX

Identifiers
- Aliases: FTXFtxThrombocytosisfamilial X-linked
- External IDs: GeneCards: ; OMA:- orthologs
Orthologs
Species	Human	Mouse
Entrez	84434	n/a
Ensembl	n/a	n/a
UniProt	n a	n/a
RefSeq (mRNA)	n/a	n/a
RefSeq (protein)	n/a	n/a
Location (UCSC)	n/a	n/a
PubMed search		n/a
- Wikidata
View/Edit Human

In molecular biology, FTX transcript, XIST regulator (non-protein coding), also known as FTX (Five prime to Xist), is a long non-coding RNA. In humans, it is located on the X chromosome. It was identified during sequence analysis of the X inactivation centre, surrounding the XIST gene. FTX contains several microRNAs within its introns. It upregulates expression of XIST, and inhibits DNA methylation of the XIST promoter.

== See also ==
- Long noncoding RNA
