= Murray Barr =

Canadian physician (1908–1995)

Murray Barr OC FRSC FRS
- Born: Murray Llewellyn Barr; June 20, 1908; Belmont, Ontario, Canada
- Died: May 4, 1995 (aged 86)
- Education: University of Western Ontario
- Occupations: Physician and Medical Researcher
- Known for: Co-discoverer of the "Barr body"
- Awards: Flavelle Medal (1959); Gairdner Foundation International Award (1963)

Murray Llewellyn Barr OC FRSC FRS (June 20, 1908 – May 4, 1995) was a Canadian physician and medical researcher who, along with graduate student Ewart George Bertram, discovered an important cell structure called the "Barr body" in 1948.

Born in Belmont, Ontario, he was educated at the University of Western Ontario, where he received his Bachelor of Arts in 1930, M.D. in 1933, and Master of Science in 1938. He was an RCAF wing commander between 1939 and 1945. From 1936 to 1977, he served as a faculty member at the University of Western Ontario. He was a member of The Harvey Club of London, the oldest medical club in Canada, which consisted of other noteworthy physicians in southwestern Ontario, and was loosely associated with the University of Western Ontario. He was also a member of the American Association for Anatomy.

In 1955, he collaborated with K.L. Moore to introduce a buccal smear test. This test used cells rubbed from the lining of the mouth to identify individuals with abnormal numbers of sex-chromosome bodies, thereby determining whether they had errors in their sex-chromosome complex. Karyotyping and chromosome studies were then used to study these errors further. This research provided a major advancement in understanding the cause of various congenital syndromes.

Murray Barr published two books, The Human Nervous System and A Century of Medicine at Western. "The Human Nervous System" was used as the primary neuroanatomy textbook by medical students for several years.

He was nominated for the Nobel Prize in Physiology or Medicine.

In 1968, he was made an Officer of the Order of Canada. In 1959, he received the Royal Society of Canada's Flavelle Medal. In 1962, he won the Joseph P. Kennedy Jr. Foundation Award for his contributions to understanding the causes of intellectual disability. In 1963, he received the Gairdner Foundation International Award, and in 1972, he was elected a Fellow of the Royal Society of London. In 1998, he was posthumously inducted into the Canadian Medical Hall of Fame.
