= Ernest Beutler =

American hematologist

- Born: September 30, 1928; Berlin, Germany
- Died: October 5, 2008 (aged 80); La Jolla, California
- Education: University of Chicago
- Spouse: Brondelle May Fleisher (4 children)
- Awards: Gairdner Foundation International Award (1975)
- Scientific career
- Fields: Hematology
- Workplaces: University of Chicago; City of Hope Medical Center; The Scripps Research Institute

Ernest Beutler (September 30, 1928 – October 5, 2008) was a German-born American hematologist and biomedical scientist. He made important discoveries about the causes of a number of diseases, including anemias, Gaucher disease, disorders of iron metabolism and Tay–Sachs disease. He was also among the first scientists to identify X-inactivation as the genetic basis of tissue mosaicism in female mammals, and pioneered a number of medical treatments, including bone marrow transplantation techniques. Beutler was the Chairman of Medicine at the City of Hope Medical Center in Duarte, CA from 1959 until 1979 and served as a Professor, then Chairman, of the Department of Molecular and Experimental Medicine at The Scripps Research Institute in La Jolla, California from 1979 until 2008.

== Early life and education ==
Born in Berlin, to a Jewish family, his family home was located on Reichskanzlerplatz, renamed “Adolf Hitler Platz” after Hitler's ascent to power, and then Theodor Heuss Platz after the Second World War. Both of his parents (Alfred and Käthe Beutler, née Italiener) were physicians. His mother, a pediatrician, was in pre-war times the physician to Harald Quandt, son of Magda Quandt née Rietschel, later Magda Goebbels, wife of the German propaganda minister. The second of three children, Beutler was preceded by an older brother, Frederick (b. October 3, 1926, later a professor of mathematics at the University of Michigan), and followed by a younger sister, Ruth (b. November 23, 1932, later a clinical psychologist; d. July 14, 1993). In 1935, when Beutler was seven years of age, the family emigrated to the United States to escape Nazi persecution. Beutler was raised in Milwaukee, Wisconsin.

At 15, Beutler enrolled in a special program at the University of Chicago, founded by Robert Hutchins, then President of the University. He completed his undergraduate, medical school and residency training at the University of Chicago, receiving his doctorate in medicine in 1950 at the age of 21. He was a member of Pi Lambda Phi and the valedictorian of his graduating class.

== Academic career and scientific contributions ==
Beutler pursued a remarkably eclectic research career, and made fundamental contributions in many different areas of science over 56 years of active publication. His first scientific paper was published in 1952, and concerned the effect of X-irradiation on susceptibility to influenza virus in mice. This was an attempt to determine whether irradiated mice might offer a better experimental model in which to detect human viral infections. Not long afterward, he published a paper on the lag phase of E. coli, which is also influenced by X-irradiation. This work, carried out during his residency in the laboratory of Leon O. Jacobson, was aimed at the development of an assay for a humoral radioprotective factor, and reflected a chance observation. Beutler also developed an early interest in iron metabolism, prompted by his clinical observation of the rapid symptomatic improvement of iron deficient patients treated with iron: an improvement that preceded any major hematologic change, and showed that numerous enzymes were sensitive to iron deficiency.

After completing his residency (1953), Beutler applied for a commission as a lieutenant in the U.S. Army, and was assigned to the Army Malaria Research Program. During this period, he worked at Joliet Prison in Illinois (1953–1954), investigating anemia produced by antimalarial drugs. In the course of his work, he identified glucose-6-phosphate dehydrogenase (G-6-PD) deficiency as a genetic defect that leads to the lysis of red blood cells under conditions of oxidative stress. This work hinged on his demonstration that red blood cell glutathione was unstable to oxidative stress. Later, he was to develop an assay for glutathione that was widely used in studies of red cell oxidative metabolism.

He was later transferred to Camp Detrick in Frederick, Maryland (1954–1955), where he studied Q fever. He was honorably discharged from the Army with the rank of captain.

Beutler then joined the faculty of the Department of Medicine at the University of Chicago, where he studied iron metabolism and red blood cell metabolism. In 1959, he became chairman of the Department of Medicine of the City of Hope National Medical Center in Duarte, California, and in 1979 assumed the chairmanship of the Department of Clinical Research at the Scripps Clinic and Research Foundation. Three years later, he was asked to become Chairman of a merged department (the Department of Molecular and Experimental Medicine) at Scripps, which later became The Scripps Research Institute in La Jolla, CA. He maintained his position as Chairman until his 80th birthday, only a few days before his death.

Not long after moving to California, Beutler made one of his most important contributions. A new colleague at the City of Hope and ultimately a lifelong friend, Susumu Ohno had recently demonstrated that the histologically observable Barr body present in the nuclei of mammalian female cells was a hyperchromatic X chromosome. Beutler immediately recognized that this might account for the variable expression of X-linked genes in females heterozygous for X-linked mutations. He soon determined that random X chromosome inactivation causes tissue mosaicism in female mammals, in that each somatic cell expresses one (but not both) of the alleles of X-linked genes with which it is endowed. This he accomplished by showing that two populations of erythrocytes exist in the blood of African American women who are heterozygous for G6PD deficiency. Mary F. Lyon independently hypothesized that variegated coat colors in mice might arise from random X chromosome inactivation. This, too, flowed from Ohno's observations.

Beutler's seminal work on G6PD deficiency led him to further explore hemolytic anemias caused by various enzyme deficiencies. The systematic methodology that he developed became the standard approach to study of patients with these disorders.

Beutler made major contributions to the understanding of Tay–Sachs disease. He purified the enzyme that is aberrant in this disease and demonstrated its multimeric structure. His group cloned the gene responsible for Gaucher disease and developed treatments for this disease, as well as diagnostic tests. Beutler also developed a screening test for galactosemia, which is used to this day to detect the disease in neonates, and prevent its severe consequences.

Beutler was the first to attempt pharmacologic intervention in sickle cell disease by increasing methemoglobin levels, carboxyhemoglobin levels, and fetal hemoglobin levels. The latter approach depended on administration of estrogen, progesterone and human chorionic gonadotropin. These attempts were unsuccessful, but presaged the use of hydroxyurea as a treatment modality.

In addition, Beutler designed the first artificial storage media for red blood cells, introduced the use of mannitol (still a mainstay in red cell preservation), and devised a variety of approaches to maintaining red cell ATP and 2,3-DPG levels and determined the viability of the cells in human volunteers.

He also played a major role in pioneering new therapies for leukemia: bone marrow transplantation in acute leukemia, and 2-chorodeoxyadenosine in chronic leukemias and lymphomas.

Beginning in the mid-1990s, Beutler attempted to positionally clone the mutation responsible for the common adult-onset form of hereditary hemochromatosis. He failed to identify the mutation before it was found by others to affect HFE, a member of the major histocompatibility complex family of proteins. However, in contrast to the reports of others, he found that only about 2% of males and no females homozygous for the mutation showed severe clinical manifestations of the disease. This study depended upon genotypic and phenotypic analysis of more than 43,000 subjects.

Beutler served as an editor of Williams Hematology, a widely used text in this medical specialty, for more than 20 years: from its inception until the last year of his life. In keeping with his editorial interests and his requirements as a publishing scientist, Beutler also wrote the software for the first comprehensive bibliographic retrieval system used by publishing scientists. Later commercialized as Reference Manager, it is still in wide use today.

He authored more than 800 publications, 19 books, and over 300 book chapters over a 55-year scientific career.

== Awards and honors ==
- Member of the National Academy of Sciences (1976)
- Fellow of the American Academy of Arts and Sciences (1975)
- Gairdner Foundation International Award (1975)
- Member of the Institute of Medicine (2004)

Beutler was a president of both the American Society of Hematology and the Western Association of Physicians. He also received a Doctor Philosophiae Honoris Causa, Tel Aviv University. He was also elected to the United States National Academy of Sciences and was presented with the inaugural Award for Lifetime Achievement from The American Society of Hematology. He was a recipient of the American Society of Hematology's E. Donnall Thomas Prize in 2003.

== Family ==
Married to Brondelle May Fleisher in 1950, Beutler had four children (Steven Merrill Beutler, Earl Bryan Beutler, Bruce Alan Beutler, and Deborah Ann Beutler). Bruce A. Beutler, also a biomedical scientist and 2011 Nobel Laureate in Physiology or Medicine, occasionally collaborated with Ernest Beutler scientifically, over a period spanning more than 30 years.
