= Barr body =

Form taken by the inactive X chromosome in a female somatic cell

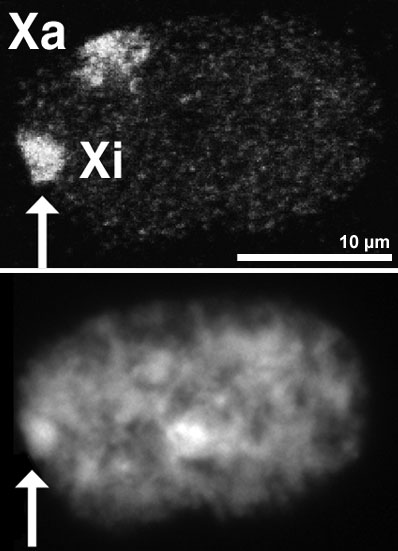
Nucleus of a female amniotic fluid cell. Top: Both X-chromosome territories are detected by FISH. Shown is a single optical section made with a confocal microscope. Bottom: Same nucleus stained with DAPI and recorded with a CCD camera. The Barr body is indicated by the arrow, it identifies the inactive X (Xi).

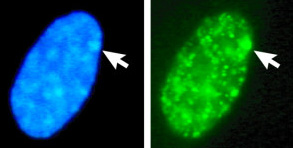
Left: DAPI stained female human fibroblast with Barr body (arrow). Right: histone macroH2A1 staining. Arrow points to sex chromatin in DAPI-stained cell nucleus, and to the corresponding sex chromatin site in the histone macroH2A1-staining.

A Barr body (named after discoverer Murray Barr) or X-chromatin is an inactive X chromosome. In species with XY sex-determination (including humans), females typically have two X chromosomes, and one is rendered inactive in a process called lyonization. Errors in chromosome separation can also result in male and female individuals with extra X chromosomes. The Lyon hypothesis states that in cells with multiple X chromosomes, all but one are inactivated early in embryonic development in mammals. The X chromosomes that become inactivated are chosen randomly, except in marsupials and in some extra-embryonic tissues of some placental mammals, in which the X chromosome from the sperm is always deactivated.

In humans with euploidy, a genotypical female (46,XX karyotype) has one Barr body per somatic cell nucleus, while a genotypical male (46,XY) has none. The Barr body can be seen in the interphase nucleus as a darkly staining small mass in contact with the nucleus membrane. Barr bodies can be seen in neutrophils at the rim of the nucleus.

In humans with more than one X chromosome, the number of Barr bodies visible at interphase is always one fewer than the total number of X chromosomes. For example, people with Klinefelter syndrome (47,XXY) have a single Barr body, and people with a 47,XXX karyotype have two Barr bodies.

== History ==
=== 1928 - Foundational research ===
The discovery of the Barr body was based on the research of geneticist Emil Heitz studying the dynamics of moss chromatin during mitosis. Heitz distinguished between heterochromatin and euchromatin, noting that certain regions of some chromosomes (and in some instances, entire chromosomes) retained their staining following mitosis. This retained staining is indicative of condensed chromatin which he hypothesized, in the absence of mitosis, reflects silent regions of chromosomes (heterochromatin).

=== 1949 - Discovery of the Barr body ===
Barr bodies were first discovered in 1949 by Canadian researcher Murray Barr and his undergraduate student Ewart Bertram. While examining the neuronal cells of female cats, they observed a distinct, densely staining structure that was absent in male cells. This structure was initially referred to as a "nucleolar satellite." Although its significance was not immediately understood, the observation laid the foundation for subsequent research in cytogenetics.

=== 1955 - Development of the buccal smear test ===
In 1955, Barr, in collaboration with K.L. Moore, developed the buccal smear test, a non-invasive method for collecting epithelial cells from the inner lining of the mouth. This technique allowed the detection of Barr bodies in somatic cells and provided a simple tool for identifying chromosomal abnormalities, such as those seen in Turner syndrome and Klinefelter syndrome. The test became widely used in the mid-20th century and was among the earliest tools for determining chromosomal sex in clinical and research contexts.

=== 1959 - Identification of the inactivated X chromosome ===
In 1959, Japanese geneticist Susumu Ohno demonstrated that the previously identified "nucleolar satellite" was in fact the inactivated X chromosome in female somatic cells. Using chromosomal staining techniques in animal models, such as rodents, he confirmed its identity and named it the "Barr body" in recognition of Barr's earlier discovery. Ohno's work clarified that the Barr body was not merely a structural feature but represented the functional silencing of one X chromosome.

=== 1961 - Discovery of Lyonization ===
In 1961, British geneticist Mary Lyon proposed the concept of X chromosome inactivation, now known as Lyonization. Her hypothesis suggested that in females, one of the two X chromosomes is randomly inactivated during early embryonic development to balance gene dosage. This idea was based on her observations of genetic mosaicism in coat color patterns in mice. Lyon's work provided a mechanistic explanation for the presence of the Barr body, linking it directly to the process of X inactivation.

== Mechanism ==
All individuals with two X chromosomes (such as the majority of human females) possesses only one Barr body per somatic cell, while all individuals with one X chromosome (such as most human males) have none.

The Barr body allows for equal expression of X chromosomes in the majority of human males and females. If X inactivation did not occur, females (XX) would be expressing two X chromosomes, and males (XY) would only be expressing one. The disappearance of a Barr body in females (expressing both X chromosomes) can result in misregulation of heterochromatin. This misregulation leaves the potential of epigenetic instability and irregular gene expression. Autosomal genes can be silenced when there is translocation of the X inactivation complex on the X chromosome to an autosome.

Mammalian X-chromosome inactivation is initiated from the X inactivation centre or Xic, usually found near the centromere. The centre contains twelve genes, seven of which code for proteins and five for untranslated RNAs. From the untranslated RNAs, only two are known to play an active role in the X inactivation process, Xist and Tsix. The centre also appears to be important in chromosome counting: ensuring that random inactivation only takes place when two or more X-chromosomes are present. The provision of an extra artificial Xic in early embryogenesis can induce inactivation of the single X found in male cells.

The roles of Xist and Tsix appear to be antagonistic. The loss of Tsix expression on the future inactive X chromosome results in an increase in levels of Xist around the Xic. Meanwhile, on the future active X Tsix levels are maintained; thus the levels of Xist remain low. This shift allows Xist to begin coating the future inactive chromosome, spreading out from the Xic. In non-random inactivation this choice appears to be fixed and current evidence suggests that the maternally inherited gene may be imprinted. Variations in Xi frequency have been reported with age, pregnancy, the use of oral contraceptives, fluctuations in menstrual cycle and neoplasia.

It is thought that this constitutes the mechanism of choice, and allows downstream processes to establish the compact state of the Barr body. These changes include histone modifications, such as histone H3 methylation (i.e. H3K27me3 by PRC2 which is recruited by Xist) and histone H2A ubiquitination, as well as direct modification of the DNA itself, via the methylation of CpG sites. These changes help inactivate gene expression on the inactive X-chromosome and to bring about its compaction to form the Barr body. 3D reconstructions and microscopic analyses of the Barr body using chromosome painting have found that it has a smoother and rounder morphology than autosomes and the active X chromosome, though it is similar in size to the latter, suggesting its chromatin is only slightly more condensed.

== Role in cancer ==
The X chromosome encodes several tumour suppressor genes and oncogenes, thus incorrect dosage compensation may contribute to cancer development through their reactivation or silencing. This could be achieved through poor epigenetic regulation of the Xi – it has been observed in several cancer types (medulloblastoma, glioblastoma, breast cancer, and acute myeloid leukemia) that the Xi accumulates more mutations than the autosomes.

Reactivation of a Barr body is possible, and has been observed in breast and ovarian cancer cells. One study showed that the frequency of Barr bodies in breast carcinoma was significantly lower than in healthy controls, indicating reactivation of previously inactivated X chromosomes. In breast cancer cell lines, a loss of the repressive histone mark H3K27me3 was observed on the inactive X chromosome, disrupting its silenced state and leading to the expression of genes that are typically repressed. This includes the bi-allelic expression of X-linked genes such as TBL1X and HDAC8, which may alter key pathways of transcriptional regulation, contributing to cancer pathogenesis.

It is more widely accepted that the loss of the Barr body in female cancers is the result of the duplication of the active X chromosome through mitotic error. In any case, it is likely the abnormal over-expression of these X-linked genes that may contribute to tumour progression and cancer development.

== See also ==
- X-inactivation
- Sex-determination system
- Demethylation
- Acetylation
- Xist
- Tsix (gene)
