= Jpx (gene) =

Non-coding RNA in the species Homo sapiens

JPX

Identifiers
- Aliases: JPX, DCBALD06, ENOX, LINC00183, NCRNA00183, Jpx, JPX transcript, XIST activator (non-protein coding), JPX transcript, XIST activator
- External IDs: OMIM: 300832; GeneCards: JPX; OMA:JPX - orthologs

Gene location (Human)
Chr.	X chromosome (human)
Band	Xq13.2	Start	73,944,182 bp
Band	Xq13.2	End	74,070,408 bp
RNA expression pattern
Bgee	Human / Mouse (ortholog); Top expressed in: epithelium of colon; Achilles tendon; right uterine tube; bone marrow cells; anterior pituitary; internal globus pallidus; C1 segment; left ovary; corpus callosum; right ovary / n/a; More reference expression data
BioGPS	n/a
Orthologs
Species	Human	Mouse
Entrez	554203	n/a
Ensembl	ENSG00000225470	n/a
UniProt	n a	n/a
RefSeq (mRNA)	n/a	n/a
RefSeq (protein)	n/a	n/a
Location (UCSC)	Chr X: 73.94 – 74.07 Mb	n/a
PubMed search		n/a
- Wikidata
View/Edit Human

In molecular biology, JPX transcript, XIST activator (non-protein coding), also known as Jpx, is a long non-coding RNA. In humans, it is located on the X chromosome. It was identified during sequence analysis of the X inactivation centre, surrounding the Xist gene. Jpx upregulates expression of Xist.

== See also ==
- Long noncoding RNA
