= Tsix =

Non-coding RNA in the species Homo sapiens

TSIX

Identifiers
- Aliases: TSIX, LINC00013, NCRNA00013, XIST-AS, XIST-AS1, XISTAS, Tsix, TSIX transcript, XIST antisense RNA
- External IDs: OMIM: 300181; GeneCards: TSIX

Gene location (Human)
| Chr. | X chromosome (human) |
| Band | Xq13.2 | Start | 73,792,205 bp |
| Band | Xq13.2 | End | 73,829,231 bp |
RNA expression pattern
| Bgee | Human / Mouse (ortholog); Top expressed in: buccal mucosa cell; lactiferous duct; pericardium; mucosa of ileum; Brodmann area 46; duodenum; testicle; lower lobe of lung; mucosa of sigmoid colon; jejunal mucosa / n/a; More reference expression data |
| BioGPS | n/a |
Orthologs
| Databases | NCBI: entry; OMA: entry |
| Species | Human | Mouse |
| Entrez | 9383 | n/a |
| Ensembl | ENSG00000270641 | n/a |
| UniProt | n a | n/a |
| RefSeq (mRNA) | n/a | n/a |
| RefSeq (protein) | n/a | n/a |
| Location (UCSC) | Chr X: 73.79 – 73.83 Mb | n/a |
| PubMed search | | n/a |
- Wikidata
| View/Edit Human |

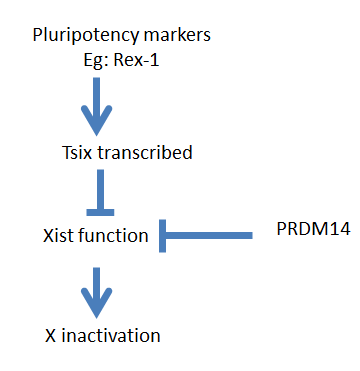
Simplified flowchart of Tsix's role in Xist gene function

Tsix is a non-coding RNA gene that is antisense to the Xist RNA. Tsix binds Xist during X chromosome inactivation. The name Tsix comes from the reverse of Xist, which stands for X-inactive specific transcript.

== Background ==
Female mammals have two X chromosomes and males have one X and one Y chromosome. The X chromosome has many active genes. This leads to dosage compensation problems: the two X chromosomes in the female will create twice as many gene products as the one X in the male. To mitigate this, one of the X chromosomes is inactivated in females, so that each sex only has one set of X chromosome genes. The inactive X chromosome in cells of females is visible as a Barr body under the microscope. Males do not have Barr bodies, as they only have one X chromosome.

Xist is only expressed from the future inactive X chromosome in females and is able to "coat" the chromosome from which it was produced. Many copies of Xist RNA bind the future inactivated X chromosome. Tsix prevents the accumulation of Xist on the future active female X chromosome to maintain the active euchromatin state of the chosen chromosome.

== Function in mammals ==
In the extra-embryonic lineage in mice and some other mammals, all female individuals have two X chromosomes. However, during embryonic development, an X chromosome is deactivated, while the other X chromosome is left untouched, in a process called imprinted X-inactivation. Xist inactivates an X chromosome at random in female mice by condensing the chromatin, via histone methylation among other mechanisms that are currently being studied. This inactivation happens at random in each individual cell, allowing for a different X chromosome to be inactivated in each cell. Female mammals are therefore called genetic mosaics, for having two different X chromosomes expressed throughout their body. Tsix binds complementary Xist RNA and renders it non-functional. After binding it, Xist is made inactive through dicer. Thus, Xist does not condense chromatin on the other X chromosome, letting it remain active. This does not occur on the other chromosome, and Xist proceeds to inactivate that chromosome. Tsix also functions to silence transcription of Xist through epigenetic regulation.

Tsix and Xist regulate X chromosome protein production in female mice to prevent early embryonic mortality. X inactivation allows for equal dosage of X-linked genes for both males and females by inactivating the extra X chromosome in the females. Mutation of the maternal Tsix gene can cause over accumulation of Xist on both X chromosomes, silencing both X chromosomes in females and the single X chromosome in male. This can cause early mortality. However, if the paternal Tsix allele is active, it can rescue female embryos from the over-accumulation of Xist.

== Mutations ==
When one allele of Tsix in mice is null, the inactivation is skewed toward the mutant X chromosome. This is due to an accumulation of Xist that is not countered by Tsix, and causes the mutant chromosome to be inactivated. When both alleles of Tsix are null (homozygous mutant), the results are low fertility, lower proportion of female births and a reversion to random X inactivation rather than gene imprinting.

== Regulation in cell differentiation ==
In development, X chromosome inactivation is a part of cellular differentiation. This is accomplished by normal Xist function. To confer pluripotency in an embryonic stem cell, factors inhibit Xist transcription. These factors also upregulate transcription of Tsix, which serves to inhibit Xist further. This cell is then able to remain pluripotent as X inactivation is not accomplished.

The marker Rex1, as well as other members of the pluripotency network, are recruited to the Tsix promoter and transcription elongation of Tsix occurs. Along with Tsix and other proteins, factor PRDM14 has been shown to be necessary for the return to pluripotency. Assisted by Tsix, PRDM14 can associate with Xist and remove the inactivation of an X chromosome.

== Tsix in humans ==
X chromosome inactivation is random in human females, and imprinting does not occur. The deletion of a CpG island, a site involved in epigenetic regulation, in the human Tsix gene prevents Tsix from imprinting on the X chromosomes. Instead, the human Tsix chromosome is coexpressed with the human Xist gene on the inactivated X chromosome, indicating that it does not play an important role in random X chromosome inactivation. An autosome may be a more likely candidate for regulating this process in humans. The presence of Tsix in humans may be an evolutionary vestige, a sequence that no longer has a function in humans. Alternately, it may be necessary to study cells closer to the X inactivation stage rather than older cells in order to accurately locate Tsix expression and function.

== See also ==
- Cellular differentiation
- Xist
- X-inactivation
- Barr body
