= DLX3 =

Mammalian protein found in Homo sapiens

Identifiers
- Aliases: DLX3, AI4, TDO, AV237891, Dlx-3, distal-less homeobox 3
- External IDs: OMIM: 600525; MGI: 94903; GeneCards: DLX3
Available structures
PDB	Ortholog search: PDBe RCSB
PDB	List of PDB id codes 4XRS

Gene location (Human)
Chr.	Chromosome 17 (human)
Band	17q21.33	Start	49,990,005 bp
Band	17q21.33	End	49,995,224 bp

Gene location (Mouse)
Chr.	Chromosome 11 (mouse)
Band	11 D|11 59.01 cM	Start	95,010,945 bp
Band	11 D|11 59.01 cM	End	95,016,122 bp
RNA expression pattern
Bgee	Human / Mouse (ortholog); Top expressed in: skin of leg; skin of abdomen; skin of arm; testicle; placenta; gums; gingival epithelium; skin of thigh; popliteal artery; tibial arteries / Top expressed in: tooth; molar; lip; hair follicle; incisor; tongue; skin of back; lower jaw; genital tubercle; mandible; More reference expression data
BioGPS	n/a
Gene ontology
Molecular function	DNA-binding transcription factor activity; DNA-binding transcription activator activity, RNA polymerase II-specific; sequence-specific DNA binding; chromatin binding; protein binding; DNA-binding transcription factor activity, RNA polymerase II-specific; DNA binding; RNA polymerase II cis-regulatory region sequence-specific DNA binding
Cellular component	nucleus
Biological process	multicellular organism development; regulation of transcription, DNA-templated; placenta development; blood vessel development; positive regulation of transcription by RNA polymerase II; transcription by RNA polymerase II; odontoblast differentiation; odontogenesis of dentin-containing tooth; regulation of transcription by RNA polymerase II; cell differentiation; epithelial cell differentiation
Sources:Amigo / QuickGO
Orthologs
Databases	NCBI: entry; OMA: entry
Species	Human	Mouse
Entrez	1747	13393
Ensembl	ENSG00000064195	ENSMUSG00000001510
UniProt	O60479	Q64205
RefSeq (mRNA)	NM_005220	NM_010055
RefSeq (protein)	NP_005211	NP_034185
Location (UCSC)	Chr 17: 49.99 – 50 Mb	Chr 11: 95.01 – 95.02 Mb
PubMed search
- Wikidata
View/Edit Human	View/Edit Mouse

Homeobox protein DLX-3 is a protein that in humans is encoded by the DLX3 gene.

== Function ==
Dlx3 is a crucial regulator of hair follicle differentiation and cycling. Dlx3 transcription is mediated through Wnt, and colocalization of Dlx3 with phospho-SMAD1/5/8 is involved in the regulation of transcription by BMP signaling. Dlx3 transcription is also induced by BMP-2 through transactivation with SMAD1 and SMAD4.

Many vertebrate homeo box-containing genes have been identified on the basis of their sequence similarity with Drosophila developmental genes. Members of the Dlx gene family contain a homeobox that is related to that of Distal-less (Dll), a gene expressed in the head and limbs of the developing fruit fly. The Distal-less (Dlx) family of genes comprises at least 6 different members, DLX1-DLX6. This gene is located in a tail-to-tail configuration with another member of the gene family on the long arm of chromosome 17.

== Clinical significance ==
Mutations in this gene have been associated with the autosomal dominant conditions trichodentoosseous syndrome (TDO) and amelogenesis imperfecta with taurodontism.
