= DLX gene family =

Genes in the DLX family

Genes in the DLX family encode homeodomain transcription factors related to the Drosophila distal-less (Dll) gene. The family has been related to a number of developmental features such as jaws and limbs. The family seems to be well preserved across species. As DLX/Dll are involved in limb development in most of the major phyla, including vertebrates, it has been suggested that Dll was involved in appendage growth in an early bilaterial ancestor.

Six members of the family are found in human and mice, numbered DLX1 to DLX6. They form two-gene clusters (bigene clusters) with each other. There are DLX1-DLX2, DLX3-DLX4, DLX5-DLX6 clusters in vertebrates, linked to Hox gene clusters HOXD, HOXB, and HOXA respectively.

In higher fishes like the zebrafish, there are two additional DLX genes, dlx2b (dlx5) and dlx4a (dlx8). These additional genes are not linked with each other, or any other DLX gene. All six other genes remain in bigene clusters.

DLX4, DLX7, DLX8 and DLX9 are the same gene in vertebrates. They are named differently because every time the same gene was found, the researchers thought they had found a new gene.

== Function ==
DLX genes, like distal-less, are involved in limb development in most of the major phyla.

DLX genes are involved in craniofacial morphogenesis and the tangential migration of interneurons from the subpallium to the pallium during vertebrate brain development. It has been suggested that DLX promotes the migration of interneurons by repressing a set of proteins that are normally expressed in terminally differentiated neurons and act to promote the outgrowth of dendrites and axons. Mice lacking DLX1 exhibit electrophysiological and histological evidence consistent with delayed-onset epilepsy.

DLX2 has been associated with a number of areas including development of the zona limitans intrathalamica and the prethalamus.

DLX4 (DLX7) is expressed in bone marrow.

DLX5 and DLX6 genes are necessary for normal formation of the mandible in vertebrates.
