= SP7 =

SP7 may refer to:

- Sp7 transcription factor, a human gene
- 2771 Polzunov (1978 SP7), a Main-belt Asteroid discovered on September 26, 1978
- S.A.R.A. SP7, a chassis of a racing car used at the 1928 24 Hours of Le Mans
