= Tricho–dento–osseous syndrome =

Mandibular Prognathism Development Pattern in Tricho Dento Osseous Syndrome
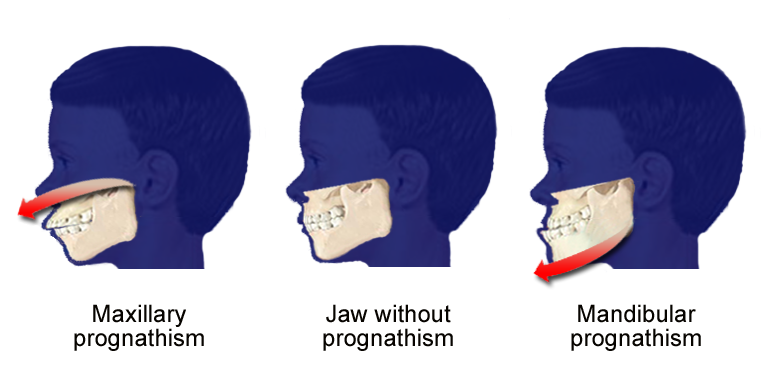
- Shows the severe underbite pattern that is a common development pattern in individuals with Tricho Dento Osseous Syndrome
- Specialty: Medical genetics, dentistry

Tricho–dento–osseous syndrome (TDO) is a rare, systemic, autosomal dominant genetic disorder that causes defects in hair, teeth, and bones respectively. This disease is present at birth. TDO has been shown to occur in areas of close geographic proximity and within families; most recent documented cases are in Virginia, Tennessee, and North Carolina. The cause of this disease is a mutation in the DLX3 (distal-less 3) gene, which controls hair follicle differentiation and induction of bone formation. All patients with TDO have two co-existing conditions called enamel hypoplasia and taurodontism in which the abnormal growth patterns of the teeth result in severe external and internal defects. The hair defects are characterized as being rough, course, with profuse shedding. Hair is curly and kinky at infancy but later straightens. Dental defects are characterized by dark-yellow/brownish colored teeth, thin and/or possibly pitted enamel, that is malformed. The teeth can also look normal in color, but also have a physical impression of extreme fragility and thinness in appearance. Additionally, severe underbites where the top and bottom teeth fail to correctly align may be present; it is common for the affected individual to have a larger, more pronounced lower jaw and longer bones. The physical deformities that TDO causes become more noticeable with age, and emotional support for the family as well as the affected individual is frequently recommended. Adequate treatment for TDO is a team based approach, mostly involving physical therapists, dentists, and oromaxillofacial surgeons. Genetic counseling is also recommended.

== Signs and symptoms ==
=== Hair and bone abnormalities ===
Hair abnormalities are very prominent in majority of the cases of TDO. Kinky/curly hair that is unusually dry and easily sheds is present at birth. In 80% of cases, the hair has a more relaxed appearance by adolescence. The presence of this hair texture type is a defining characteristic between a diagnosis of TDO verses amelogenesis imperfecta with hypomaturation. Additionally, in TDO the nails are usually abnormally thin, brittle, and split frequently. Cranial deficiencies are marked by the presence of having a long skull relative to its width, or protrusive foreheads due to increased thickness of the cranial bones and premature closing of the associated sutures in the skull. The long bones in the body (arms, legs) are also abnormally long and tend to fracture very easily. Osteosclerosis, commonly seen in TDO cases is characterized by an increase in bone density, affecting the skull and the mastoid process located behind the jawbone on the skull, as well as a shortened ramus seen in people with TDO. There are no known pathological problems associated with hair and bone changes in people with this disease. Changes in the long bones tend to appear later in development, but changes in the teeth appear once the teeth being to form, called primary dentition. The hair and bone abnormalities are evaluated radiographically during initial diagnosis, and visually during the course of the disease. Radiographic exams may be repeated if there is suspect of fracture.

=== Oral abnormalities ===
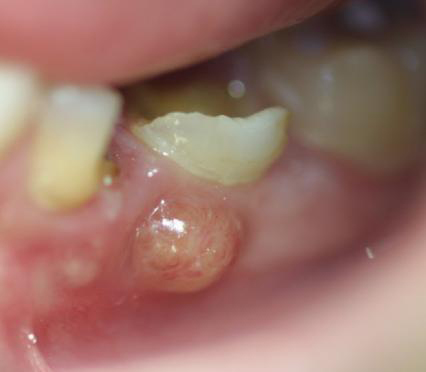
Dental abscess commonly seen in people with underdeveloped tooth enamel caused by TDO.

In the oral cavity 100% of people diagnosed with TDO have taurodontism which is characterized by vertically enlarged pulp chambers at the expense of the roots of the teeth; the floor of the pulp chamber and furcation is moved apically down. This is due to the failure of the Hertwig epithelial root sheath which maps the shape of the forming tooth roots during active differentiation. Amelogenesis imperfecta, an abnormal formation of the enamel or external layer of the crown of the tooth, may also be present where the tooth enamel may be thin or absent. There are several clinical subsets of amelogenesis imperfecta, but common to TDO is the hypoplastic-hypomaturation subtype; the hypomaturation-hypoplastic is less common in individuals with TDO. The difference between the 2 dominant subtypes is the changes seen in the enamel matrix, and the phenotypic type that predominates. The hypoplastic-hypomaturation type of amelogenesis imperfecta with TDO occurs where the tooth enamel depicts a generalized pitted pattern, with open contacts between the teeth as well as an open bite. A smaller number of cases are of the hypomaturation-hypoplastic case type, in which the enamel structure is softer due to the under maturation of ameloblasts during development. Mandibular prognathism also called a severe underbite, is also a prominent feature in TDO. Prognathism defects are diagnosed based the level of severity that this condition interferes with being able to chew or speak properly.

Due to improper tooth development, TDO patients have high rates of dental caries causing dental abscess. The under maturation of the enamel causes the tooth structure to be softer, and more susceptible to the effects of bruxism due to abnormalities in skeletal development. The oral abnormalities are evaluated by radiographs and visual examination. Oral radiographs are frequently repeated due to the high incidence of infection due to abnormal biting patterns seen in TDO cases.

== Cause ==
an autosomal dominant pattern.

TDO is caused by autosomal dominant mutations in the DLX gene family. Known mutations include a 4-basepair deletion in exon 3 of DLX3 on chromosome 17q21, causing a frameshift mutation.

== Pathogenesis ==
DLX3 plays numerous significant roles during osseous, connective tissue, and dermal cell differentiation. It is expressed in the placenta and is important for embryonic development of hard bone tissue in the teeth, skull, and long bones such as in the arms and legs. During normal tooth development, DLX3 is predominantly expressed in the inner tooth enamel epithelium. In TDO cases, DLX3 is expressed in the outer enamel epithelium and leads to the abnormally thin enamel observed in the disease, which leads to tooth attrition and is most often the cause of dental abscess seen in TDO persons. DLX3 in TDO is also responsible for upper cranial thickness, calvaria, osteosclerosis of the long bones, long narrow head (dolichocephaly), abnormally thin brittle nails, and premature closing of fibrous joints. Consequently, 95% of people with TDO that are 16 years old or younger show skeletal abnormalities before full maturation takes place.

Lack of mastoid pneumatization by mastoid cells occurs in 82% of the cases and is rarely prevalent outside of TDO diagnosis. Mastoid pneumatization occurs at about 6 months of ages and acts to minimize pressure fluctuations in the Eustachian tubes of the ear. The mastoid lies posterior to the lower jawbone (mandible) and distal to the ear. The Eustachian tube connects the middle ear to the back of the nose, and acts to create a specific pressure in the ear canal that causes vibrations to the eardrum; if adequate pressure is not attained, muffled, dull hearing results. In addition to the mastoid pneumatization assisting the Eustachian tubes for normal hearing, lack of mastoid pneumatization causes inflammation of the ear, general irritation, and does not allow enough air in to assist with mucus flowing out. It is not completely understood why gene mutations occur, but it is known that genetic mutations that cause disease are acquired from either or both parents at fertilization.

== Diagnosis ==
TDO is diagnosed by radiographic imaging, physical characteristics of the disease, and genetic testing. Radiographs such as cephalometric analysis or panoramic radiograph are used to detect skeletal abnormalities in TDO cases; these radiographs along with the phenotypic effects of the disease are often enough evidence for proper diagnosis. In TDO, radiologic imaging almost always shows evidence of hardening of bone tissue (sclerosis), lesions on the bone structures surrounding the teeth due to decay or trauma, or hard tissue mass. The radiographic testing is non-invasive, and involves the patient to be able to sit or stand in front of the radiographic device with their mouth closed and lips relaxed for approximately one minute. Oral abnormalities are diagnosed by a visual dental examination. A normal oral evaluation would show no signs of broken or fractured teeth, attrition of tooth enamel, no spacing between teeth, no soft tissue mass or sign of dental abscess, and a bite relationship where the mandibular (bottom) teeth interdigitate within a normal plane of 1-2mm behind and underneath the maxillary (top) teeth.

=== Overlapping diseases ===
It is phenotypically difficult to diagnose between TDO and Amelogenesis imperfecta of the hypomaturation-hypoplasia type with taurodontism (AIHHT) as they are very closely linked phenotypically during adulthood, and the only distinguishing characteristic is found during genetic analysis by Polymerase Chain Reaction (PCR) amplification. This type of test in diagnosis of TDO is only used during research or if there is a concern of genetic issue to a particular individual whose family member has been diagnosed with TDO.

== Prevention ==
Preventive maintenance therapy for the oral effects of TDO involve frequent dental cleanings, professional application of desensitizing medication, diet counseling, and oral hygiene instructions in proper home care and maintenance; medicated dental rinses and toothpastes are also prescribed as people with TDO are more prone to oral hard tissue disease and early tooth loss. If restorative dentistry is performed without orthodontics to correct the protrusion of the lower jaw, a dental night guard worn at bedtimes on the upper or lower teeth to protect them from the effects of grinding may be recommended.

In extreme cases, tooth loss is inevitable, and the patient will consult with a prosthodontist to determine tooth replacement options such as dental implants, or partial dentures. There is no cure for TDO, but managing its oral and systemic affects is key to having the most favorable outcome from the disease. As the person affected by TDO ages, increased bone fractures may occur. The person with TDO should watch for any pimple like masses on the gum tissue, pain or soreness in the teeth and gums, broken or chipped teeth, feeling of water in the ear or severe pain in the extremities which could indicate fracture.

== Treatment ==
The hair, teeth, and skeletal side effects of TDO are lifelong, and treatment is used to manage those effects. A person with TDO has the same life expectancy as a person without TDO. There are no cures or medications used to treat systemic effects of TDO, but medications for the frequent ear and dental infections can be used to manage its symptoms. A team based approach between dental specialists, oral and maxillofacial surgeons, and physicians is necessary for treating the systemic effects and improves the prognosis. It is also recommended for affected individuals to seek counseling to be better able to cope with any psychosocial problems due to oral and facial abnormalities that occur with TDO.

At home, a person with TDO may be instructed to use frequent deep conditioning treatments and low manipulation hair styling to control shedding and hair loss. Clinical treatment involves the use of radiology to determine the effects that TDO has had on the surrounding teeth and bone structures. A series of appointments with the healthcare team are usually necessary to correct TDO abnormalities with treatment duration lasting from several months to through full oral-facial maturation stages.

Endodontic procedures are routinely recommended due to treatdental pulp exposure or periodontal abscess. Maxillofacial surgery may be required to establish a more appropriate mastication, skeletal, and esthetic relationship vertically between the teeth to improve functioning. Esthetic procedures such as dental crown (dentistry) or veneer (dentistry) are often performed to improve the physical look of the teeth and to strengthen the weak enamel caused by TDO.

Root canal procedure: unhealthy or injured tooth, subsequent creation of an access cavity with a dental handpiece, cleaning & shaping the root canals with an endodontic file, and restoration with gutta-percha filling and a crown

== Recent research ==
Amelogenesis imperfecta hypomaturation type with taurodontism are often confused. Amelogenesis imperfecta of the hypomaturation type with taurodontism (AIHHT) has no hair or bone changes which helps to differentiate between TDO cases and AIHHT. Polymerase chain reaction also known as PCR is used to amply pieces of DNA and observed for the 141 base pair allele as a result of a deletion of four nucleotides in exon 3 of the DLX-3 gene. Additionally, the current research shows that there is heavy reliance on the physical characteristics in the differentiation of TDO verses AIHHT and the severity and prevalence of their expression. For instance, taurodontism is severely expressed in TDO, but mildly expressed in AIHHT. Currently, researchers are trying to identify the reason for the alteration in the DLX-3 and DLX-7 genes that are responsible for AIHHT versus TDO.

== See also ==
- List of dental abnormalities associated with cutaneous conditions
- Tricho–rhino–phalangeal syndrome
