= DLX5 =

Mammalian protein found in Homo sapiens

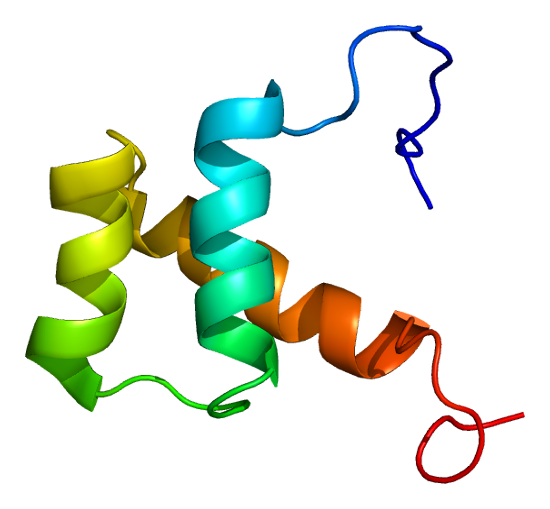

Identifiers
- Aliases: DLX5, SHFM1D, AI385752, distal-less homeobox 5, SHFM1
- External IDs: OMIM: 600028; MGI: 101926; GeneCards: DLX5
Available structures
PDB	Ortholog search: PDBe RCSB
PDB	List of PDB id codes 2DJN, 4RDU

Gene location (Human)
Chr.	Chromosome 7 (human)
Band	7q21.3	Start	97,020,396 bp
Band	7q21.3	End	97,024,950 bp

Gene location (Mouse)
Chr.	Chromosome 6 (mouse)
Band	6 A1|6 2.83 cM	Start	6,877,805 bp
Band	6 A1|6 2.83 cM	End	6,882,085 bp
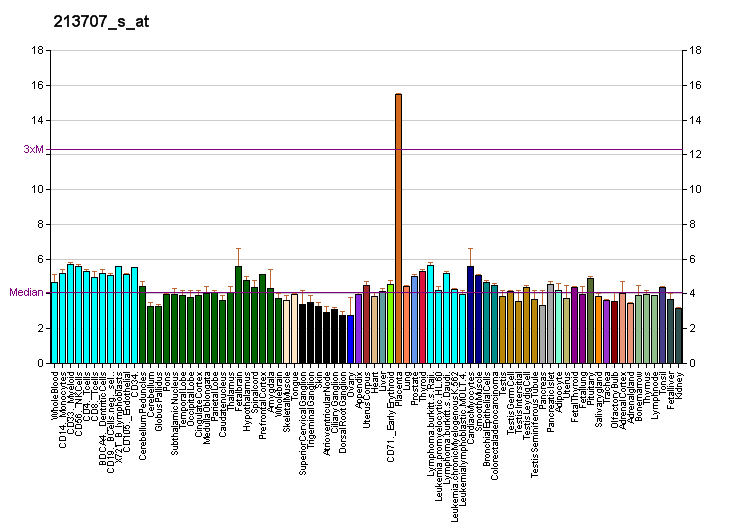
RNA expression pattern
Bgee	Human / Mouse (ortholog); Top expressed in: tibia; gonad; skin of leg; endometrium; skin of abdomen; testicle; Achilles tendon; placenta; periodontal fiber; ganglionic eminence / Top expressed in: neural plate; neural groove; neural fold; molar; medial ganglionic eminence; genital tubercle; Apical ectodermal ridge; subthalamus; surface ectoderm; mandibular prominence; More reference expression data
BioGPS	More reference expression data
Gene ontology
Molecular function	DNA binding; sequence-specific DNA binding; HMG box domain binding; DNA-binding transcription activator activity, RNA polymerase II-specific; RNA polymerase II cis-regulatory region sequence-specific DNA binding; DNA-binding transcription factor activity, RNA polymerase II-specific; DNA-binding transcription factor activity
Cellular component	cytoplasm; nucleus
Biological process	skeletal system development; roof of mouth development; regulation of transcription, DNA-templated; epithelial cell differentiation; axonogenesis; ossification; positive regulation of epithelial cell proliferation; positive regulation of canonical Wnt signaling pathway; anatomical structure formation involved in morphogenesis; bone morphogenesis; head development; cellular response to BMP stimulus; ear development; endochondral ossification; transcription by RNA polymerase II; BMP signaling pathway; olfactory pit development; transcription, DNA-templated; nervous system development; axon guidance; positive regulation of transcription, DNA-templated; multicellular organism development; embryonic limb morphogenesis; inner ear morphogenesis; osteoblast differentiation; cell population proliferation; face morphogenesis; positive regulation of transcription by RNA polymerase II; positive regulation of transcription from RNA polymerase II promoter involved in cellular response to chemical stimulus; positive regulation of gene expression; olfactory bulb interneuron differentiation; interneuron axon guidance; regulation of transcription by RNA polymerase II; cell differentiation
Sources:Amigo / QuickGO
Orthologs
Databases	NCBI: entry; OMA: entry
Species	Human	Mouse
Entrez	1749	13395
Ensembl	ENSG00000105880	ENSMUSG00000029755
UniProt	P56178	P70396
RefSeq (mRNA)	NM_005221	NM_010056; NM_198854
RefSeq (protein)	NP_005212	NP_034186; NP_942151
Location (UCSC)	Chr 7: 97.02 – 97.02 Mb	Chr 6: 6.88 – 6.88 Mb
PubMed search
- Wikidata
View/Edit Human	View/Edit Mouse

Homeobox protein DLX-5 is a protein that in humans is encoded by the distal-less homeobox 5 gene, or DLX5 gene. DLX5 is a member of the DLX gene family.

== Function ==
This gene encodes a member of a homeobox transcription factor gene family similar to the Drosophila distal-less (Dll) gene. The encoded protein may play a role in bone development and fracture healing. Current research holds that the homeobox gene family is important in appendage development. DLX5 and DLX6 can be seen to work in conjunction and are both necessary for proper craniofacial, axial, and appendicular skeleton development. Mutations in this gene, which is located in a tail-to-tail configuration with DLX6 on the long arm of chromosome 7, may be associated with split-hand/split-foot malformation.

DLX5 also acts as the early BMP-responsive transcriptional activator needed for osteoblast differentiation by stimulating the up-regulation of a variety of promoters (ALPL promoter, SP7 promoter, MYC promoter).

== Clinical significance ==
Mutations in the DLX5 gene have been shown to be involved in the split hand and foot malformation syndrome (SHFM). SHFM is a heterogenous limb defect in which the development of the central digital rays is hindered, leading to missing central digits and claw-like distal extremities. Other defects associated with DLX5 include sensorineural hearing loss, mental retardation, ectodermal and craniofacial findings, and orofacial clefting.

In mice, the targeted disruption of DLX1, DLX2, DLX1/2, or DLX5 orthologs yields craniofacial, bone, and vestibular defects. If DLX5 is disrupted in conjunction with DLX6, bone, inner ear, and severe craniofacial defects are prevalent. Research utilizing Dlx5/6-nulls suggests that these genes have both unique and redundant functions.

== Role in development ==
DLX5 begins to express DLX5 protein in the facial and branchial arch mesenchyme, otic vesicles, and frontonasal ectoderm at around day 8.5-9. By day 12.5, DLX5 protein begins to be expressed in the brain, bones, and all remaining skeletal structures. Expression in the brain and skeleton begins to decrease by day 17.

== Interactions ==
DLX5 has been shown to interact with DLX1, DLX2, DLX6, MSX1 and MSX2.
