= Homeobox protein MSX-1 =

Protein-coding gene in the species Homo sapiens

MSX1
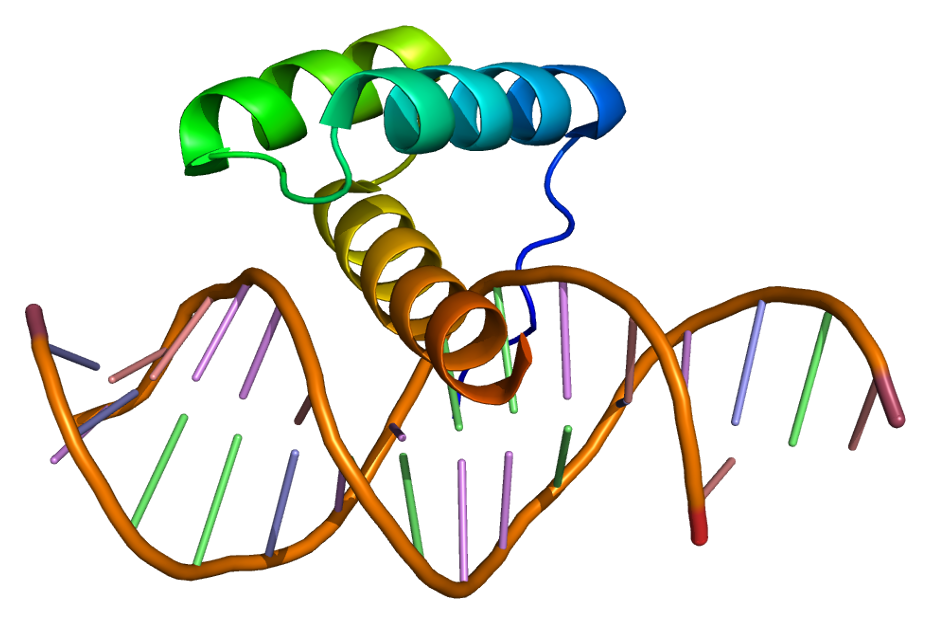

Identifiers
- Aliases: MSX1, ECTD3, HOX7, HYD1, STHAG1, msh homeobox 1
- External IDs: OMIM: 142983; MGI: 97168; GeneCards: MSX1
Available structures
PDB	Ortholog search: PDBe RCSB
PDB	List of PDB id codes 1IG7

Gene location (Human)
Chr.	Chromosome 4 (human)
Band	4p16.2	Start	4,859,665 bp
Band	4p16.2	End	4,863,936 bp

Gene location (Mouse)
Chr.	Chromosome 5 (mouse)
Band	5 B3|5 20.21 cM	Start	37,977,829 bp
Band	5 B3|5 20.21 cM	End	37,981,927 bp
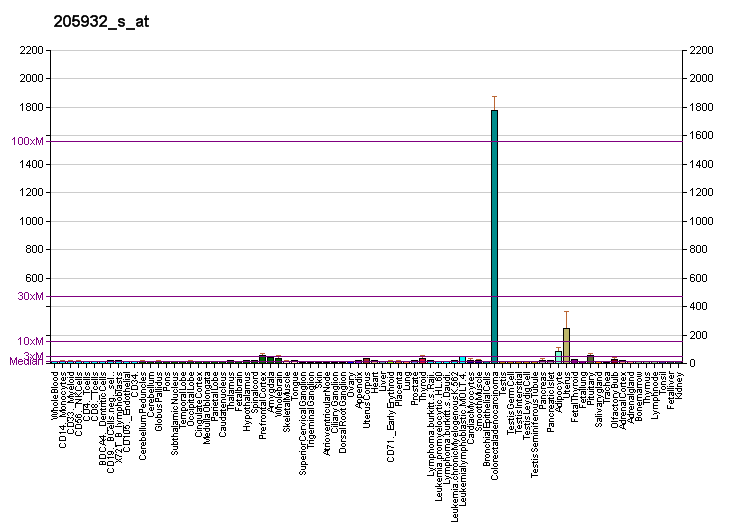
RNA expression pattern
Bgee	Human / Mouse (ortholog); Top expressed in: buccal mucosa cell; Epithelium of choroid plexus; canal of the cervix; periodontal fiber; saphenous vein; endometrium; oocyte; vena cava; secondary oocyte; urethra / Top expressed in: desmocranium; choroid plexus of fourth ventricle; dental papilla; Epithelium of choroid plexus; hand; amnion; maxillary prominence; lateral nasal prominence; abdominal wall; maxillary part of mouth; More reference expression data
BioGPS	More reference expression data
Gene ontology
Molecular function	DNA-binding transcription repressor activity, RNA polymerase II-specific; sequence-specific DNA binding; RNA polymerase II transcription regulatory region sequence-specific DNA binding; transcription factor activity, RNA polymerase II core promoter proximal region sequence-specific binding; DNA-binding transcription activator activity, RNA polymerase II-specific; p53 binding; DNA binding; DNA-binding transcription factor activity, RNA polymerase II-specific
Cellular component	nucleoplasm; nucleus
Biological process	anterior/posterior pattern specification; negative regulation of cell population proliferation; negative regulation of striated muscle cell differentiation; signal transduction involved in regulation of gene expression; regulation of odontogenesis; negative regulation of transcription regulatory region DNA binding; stem cell differentiation; positive regulation of mesenchymal cell apoptotic process; mammary gland epithelium development; negative regulation of apoptotic process; activation of meiosis; positive regulation of BMP signaling pathway; transcription, DNA-templated; cartilage morphogenesis; positive regulation of intrinsic apoptotic signaling pathway by p53 class mediator; multicellular organism development; odontogenesis; bone morphogenesis; embryonic limb morphogenesis; BMP signaling pathway; middle ear morphogenesis; mesenchymal cell proliferation; embryonic forelimb morphogenesis; negative regulation of DNA binding; positive regulation of DNA damage response, signal transduction by p53 class mediator; heart morphogenesis; BMP signaling pathway involved in heart development; cell morphogenesis; development of the heart; forebrain development; muscle organ development; negative regulation of transcription by RNA polymerase II; roof of mouth development; embryonic digit morphogenesis; in utero embryonic development; protein stabilization; regulation of transcription, DNA-templated; positive regulation of transcription by RNA polymerase II; epithelial to mesenchymal transition involved in endocardial cushion formation; transcription by RNA polymerase II; negative regulation of cell growth; epithelial to mesenchymal transition; embryonic hindlimb morphogenesis; negative regulation of transcription, DNA-templated; protein localization to nucleus; midbrain development; odontogenesis of dentin-containing tooth; embryonic nail plate morphogenesis; face morphogenesis; pituitary gland development; cellular response to nicotine; cartilage development; embryonic morphogenesis
Sources:Amigo / QuickGO
Orthologs
Databases	NCBI: entry; OMA: entry
Species	Human	Mouse
Entrez	4487	17701
Ensembl	ENSG00000163132	ENSMUSG00000048450
UniProt	P28360	P13297
RefSeq (mRNA)	NM_002448	NM_010835
RefSeq (protein)	NP_002439	NP_034965
Location (UCSC)	Chr 4: 4.86 – 4.86 Mb	Chr 5: 37.98 – 37.98 Mb
PubMed search
- Wikidata
View/Edit Human	View/Edit Mouse

Homeobox protein MSX-1, is a protein that in humans is encoded by the MSX1 gene. MSX1 transcripts are not only found in thyrotrope-derived TSH cells, but also in the TtT97 thyrotropic tumor, which is a well differentiated hyperplastic tissue that produces both TSHß- and a-subunits and is responsive to thyroid hormone. MSX1 is also expressed in highly differentiated pituitary cells which until recently was thought to be expressed exclusively during embryogenesis. There is a highly conserved structural organization of the members of the MSX family of genes and their abundant expression at sites of inductive cell–cell interactions in the embryo suggest that they have a pivotal role during early development.

== Function ==
This gene encodes a member of the muscle segment homeobox gene family. The encoded protein functions as a transcriptional repressor during embryogenesis through interactions with components of the core transcription complex and other homeoproteins. It may also have roles in limb-pattern formation, craniofacial development, in particular, odontogenesis, and tumor growth inhibition. There is also strong evidence from sequencing studies of candidate genes involved in clefting that mutations in the MSX1 gene may be associated in the pathogenesis of cleft lip and palate. Mutations in this gene, which was once known as homeobox 7, have also been associated with Witkop syndrome, Wolf–Hirschhorn syndrome, and autosomal dominant hypodontia. Haploinsufficiency of MSX1 protein affects the development of all teeth, preferentially third molars and second premolars. The effect of haploinsufficiency of PAX9 on the development of incisors and premolars is probably caused by a deficiency of MSX1 protein.

Phenotypes caused by deficiency of MSX1 protein might depend on the localization of mutations and their effect on the protein structure and function. Two substitution mutations, Arg196Pro and Met61Lys cause only familial non-syndromic tooth agenesis. Frameshift mutations, Ser202Stop mutation, resulting in a protein that lacks the C-terminal end of the homeodomain, impairs not only teeth but also nail formation, while Ser105Stop mutation, causing complete absence of the MSX1 homeodomain, is responsible for the most severe phenotype, which includes orofacial clefts with accompanied tooth agenesis.

MSX1 is one of the strongest candidate genes for specific forms of tooth agenesis, mutations in this gene was detected only in some affected individuals. Genes expressed in the early dental epithelium in mice such as Bmp4, Bmp7, Dlx2, Dlx5, Fgf1, Fgf2, Fgf4, Fgf8, Lef1, Gli2, and Gli3 are also potential candidates. Based on existing evidence, it seems possible that both hypodontia and oligodontia are heterogeneous traits, caused by several independent defective genes, which act along or in combination with other genes and lead to specific phenotypes.

MSX1 is found to have a linkage with Witkop syndrome, also known as “tooth and nail syndrome” or “nail dysgenesis and hypodontia” since mutations in MSX1 were shown to be associated with tooth agenesis. There is a linkage found between TNS and markers surrounding the MSX1 locus and it showed that a nonsense mutation (S202X) in MSX1 cosegregated with the TNS phenotype in a three-generation family.

== Interactions ==
MSX1 has been shown to interact with DLX5, CREB binding protein, Sp1 transcription factor, DLX2, TATA binding protein and Msh homeobox 2.

LHX2, a LIMtype homeoprotein, is a protein partner for MSX1 in vitro and in cellular extracts. The interaction between MSX1 and LHX2 is mediated through the homeodomain-containing regions of both proteins. MSX1 and LHX2 form a protein complex in the absence of DNA, and that DNA binding by either protein alone can occur at the expense of protein complex formation.
