= RIOX1 =

Protein-coding gene in humans

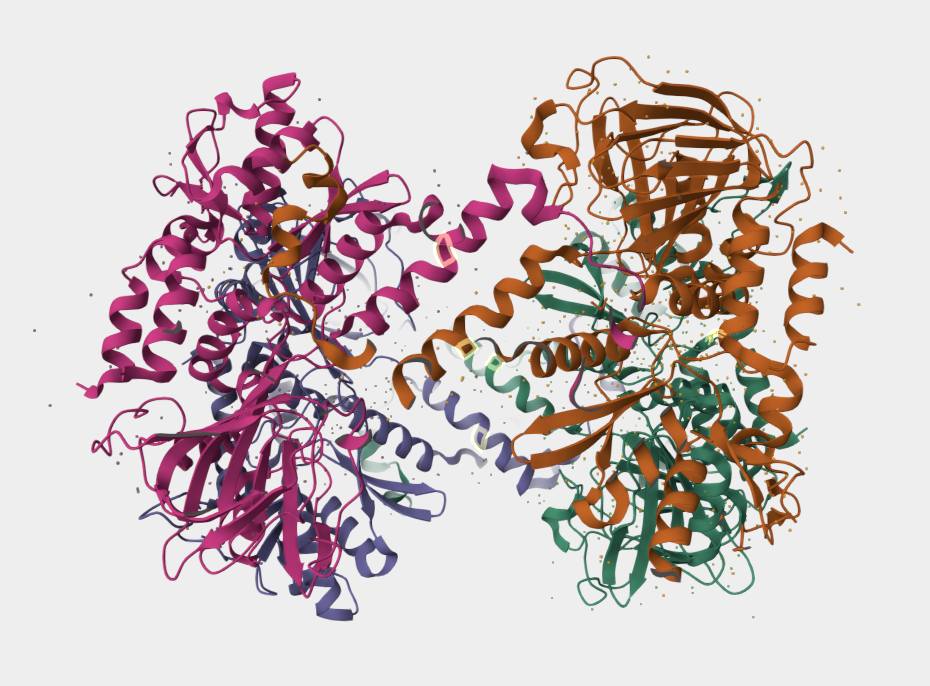

Identifiers
- Aliases: RIOX1, MAPJD, NO66, ROX, hsNO66, URLC2, C14orf169, chromosome 14 open reading frame 169, ribosomal oxygenase 1, JMJD9
- External IDs: OMIM: 611919; MGI: 1919202; GeneCards: RIOX1
Available structures
PDB	Ortholog search: PDBe RCSB
PDB	List of PDB id codes 4CCJ, 4CCK, 4CCM, 4CCN, 4CCO, 4DIQ, 4E4H, 4Y4R, 4Y33, 4Y3O
Enzyme activity
EC #	BRENDA	ExPASy	KEGG	MetaCyc
1.14.11.27	↗	↗	↗	↗
1.14.11.79	↗	↗	↗	↗

Gene location (Human)
Chr.	Chromosome 14 (human)
Band	14q24.3	Start	73,490,933 bp
Band	14q24.3	End	73,493,394 bp

Gene location (Mouse)
Chr.	Chromosome 12 (mouse)
Band	12|12 D1	Start	83,997,382 bp
Band	12|12 D1	End	83,999,725 bp
RNA expression pattern
Bgee	Human / Mouse (ortholog); Top expressed in: oocyte; sperm; gonad; secondary oocyte; granulocyte; testicle; right testis; ganglionic eminence; mucosa of ileum; left testis / Top expressed in: granulocyte; primitive streak; epiblast; endocardial cushion; abdominal wall; hair follicle; somite; embryo; renal corpuscle; medullary collecting duct; More reference expression data
BioGPS	n/a
Gene ontology
Molecular function	oxidoreductase activity; protein binding; dioxygenase activity; metal ion binding; histone H3-methyl-lysine-4 demethylase activity; histone H3-methyl-lysine-36 demethylase activity; 2-oxoglutarate-dependent dioxygenase activity; iron ion binding
Cellular component	nucleoplasm; nucleus; nucleolus
Biological process	regulation of transcription, DNA-templated; transcription, DNA-templated; histone H3-K4 demethylation; histone H3-K36 demethylation; chromatin remodeling; negative regulation of transcription, DNA-templated; negative regulation of osteoblast differentiation; peptidyl-arginine hydroxylation; chromatin organization
Sources:Amigo / QuickGO
Orthologs
Databases	NCBI: entry; OMA: entry
Species	Human	Mouse
Entrez	79697	71952
Ensembl	ENSG00000170468	ENSMUSG00000046791
UniProt	Q9H6W3	Q9JJF3
RefSeq (mRNA)	NM_024644	NM_023633
RefSeq (protein)	NP_078920	NP_076122
Location (UCSC)	Chr 14: 73.49 – 73.49 Mb	Chr 12: 84 – 84 Mb
PubMed search
- Wikidata
View/Edit Human	View/Edit Mouse

Ribosomal oxygenase 1 is a protein that in humans is encoded by the RIOX1 gene (previously NO66). It is a Jumonji C (JmjC) domain-containing protein in the subgroup of ribosomal oxygenases (ROXs), part of the superfamily of Fe(II) and 2-oxoglutarate (2OG)-dependent oxygenases. RIOX1 is encoded by a single-exon, intronless gene conserved across several species, and has been implicated in the regulation of gene transcription in the nucleus. RIOX1 is a dual-location protein found in the nucleus, nucleolus, and nucleoplasm.Expression of RIOX1 has been reported to correlate with the malignant potential of renal cell tumours and colorectal cancer, and RIOX1 has been reported as an oncogenic driver in prostate cancer.

== Evolution ==
Analysis of RIOX1 and RIOX2 orthologous genes from different species show presence of the gene in early Cnidaria. The genomic sequence exhibited presence of both RIOX1 and RIOX2 in Hydra vugaris, an early metazoan in the phylum Cnidaria. In addition to presence in Cnidaria, RIOX1 was found in the genes of Arthropoda, Annelida, Nematoda and Mollusca, where RIOX2 was not found, with the exception of Priapulida. RIOX1's presence across species suggests that the gene is phylogenetically older, from which RIOX2 was evolved. RIOX2 is thought to have evolved in Chordata.

== Subcellular distribution ==
Ribosomal oxygenase 1 It is a dual-location protein found in the nucleus, nucleolus, and nucleoplasm of the cell. The protein has a large accumulation in nuclei as well as in intranuclear bodies of late replicating chromatin. Ribosomal oxygenase 1 is localized to perichromosomal cytoplasm in metaphase and early anaphase. It is localized to chromosomes in late anaphase and localized to prenucleolar bodies in late telophase.

== Structure ==
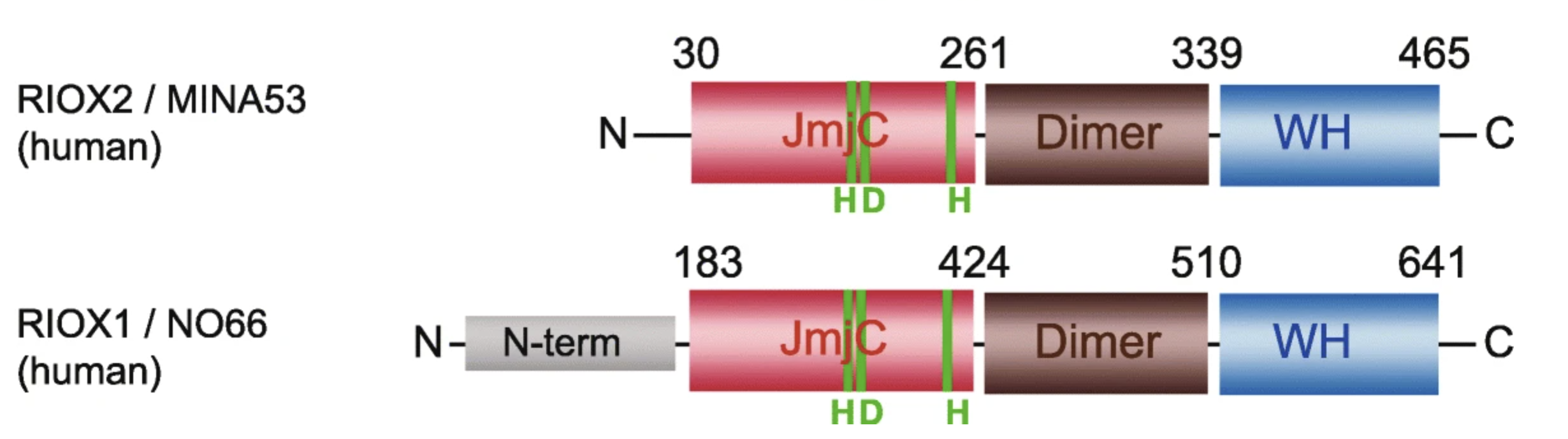
Domain architecture for RIOX1 and RIOX2

RIOX1 has a length of 2429 base pairs. It consists of 641 amino acids.Structure of the protein shows active sites within the JmjC domains, a dimerization domain, and a winged-helix domain. The crystal structure of RIOX1 folds into a functional tetrameric formation. Research on the structure of NO66 showed the JmjC domain from residues 176-426, hinge-domain from residues 427-510, beta hairpin motif from residues 511-547, and the C-terminal wHTH motif from residues 548-510. The dimer interface consists of two similar molecules in one asymmetrical unit (main-chain r.m.s.d. = 0.22Å).Both the JmjC and C-terminal domains are necessary in tetrameric assembly (compilation of four individual subunits or monomers). The JmjC domain can form stable dimers when interacting with C-terminal helices. RIOX1 contains a region with similarities with the COG2850 (cluster of orthologous groups of proteins).

RIOX1 and RIOX2 differ in the presence of the N-terminal extension, which is not found in RIOX2. The N-terminal extension is predicted to have a nuclear localization signal, which is an amino acid sequence that can tag proteins for transport into the cell's nucleus.

The JmjC domain found in the RIOX1 gene is a part of the regulatory network of Osterix. RIOX1 interacts with Osterix and inhibits Osterix-dependent promoter activities. Osterix is an osteoblast-specific transcription factor necessary for differentiation in osteoblasts and bone formation. The oligomerization (monomers combining) interface of RIOX1 interacts with a fragment of Osterix. The amino acid residues that form the Osterix binding groove are highly conserved in different vertebrate species, which indicates that RIOX1 plays a role in regulation of the differentiation of osteoblasts and bone formation by interaction with Osterix. Hinge domain-dependent oligomerization of RIOX1 is also necessary in inhibition of Osterix dependent gene activation.

== Function ==
RIOX1 is involved in ribosome biogenesis and in the replication and regulation of heterochromatic regions of the nucleus. It has been described as a chromatin regulator and a regulator of osteoblast differentiation.

Both RIOX1 and RIOX2 (previously MINA53) modify ribosomal proteins through histidine hydroxylation, including hydroxylation of His216 in ribosomal protein RPL8. RIOX1 contains an N-terminal extension that is absent from RIOX2. This extension may mediate interactions with other molecules and contribute to protein folding.

RIOX1 is a member of the JmjC-domain-containing protein family, whose members include histone demethylases that regulate chromatin structure and gene expression. RIOX1 enables protein demethylase and peptidyl-histidine dioxygenase activity and has also been implicated in the regulation of DNA repair.

During mitosis in MCF-7 cells, RIOX1 is localised to the perichromosomal cytoplasm during metaphase and early anaphase, to chromosomes during late anaphase, and to prenucleolar bodies during late telophase. The perichromosomal layer is a specialised chromosome-associated protein layer that contributes to chromosome organisation and other cellular processes.

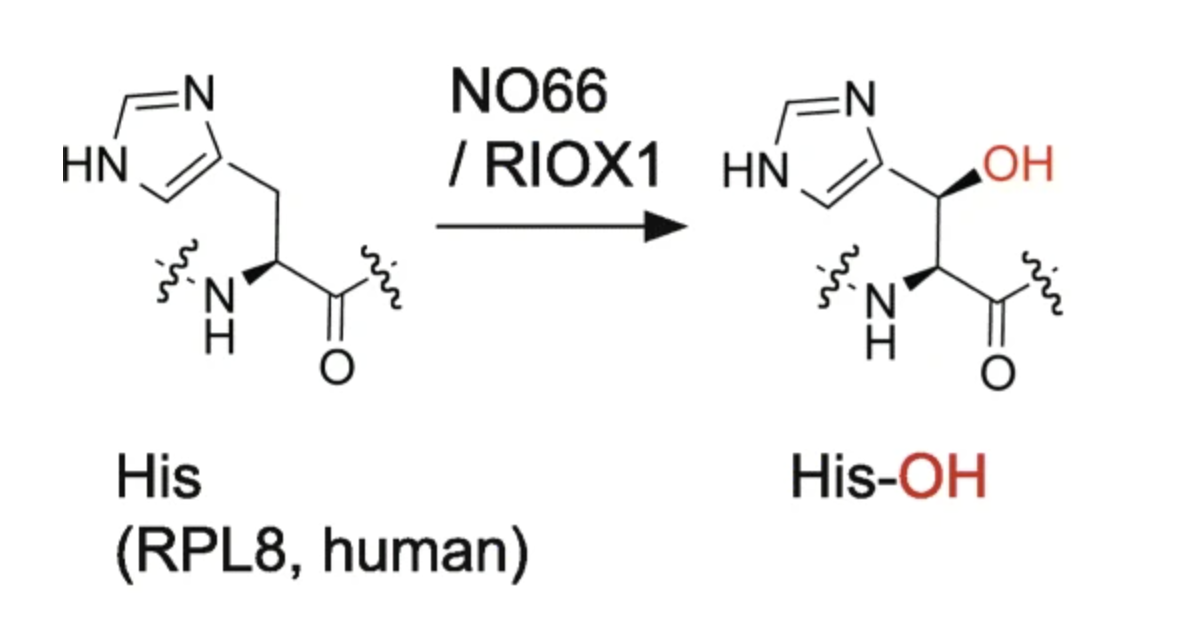
RIOX1/NO66 hydroxylates histidine residues in the ribosomal protein RPL8

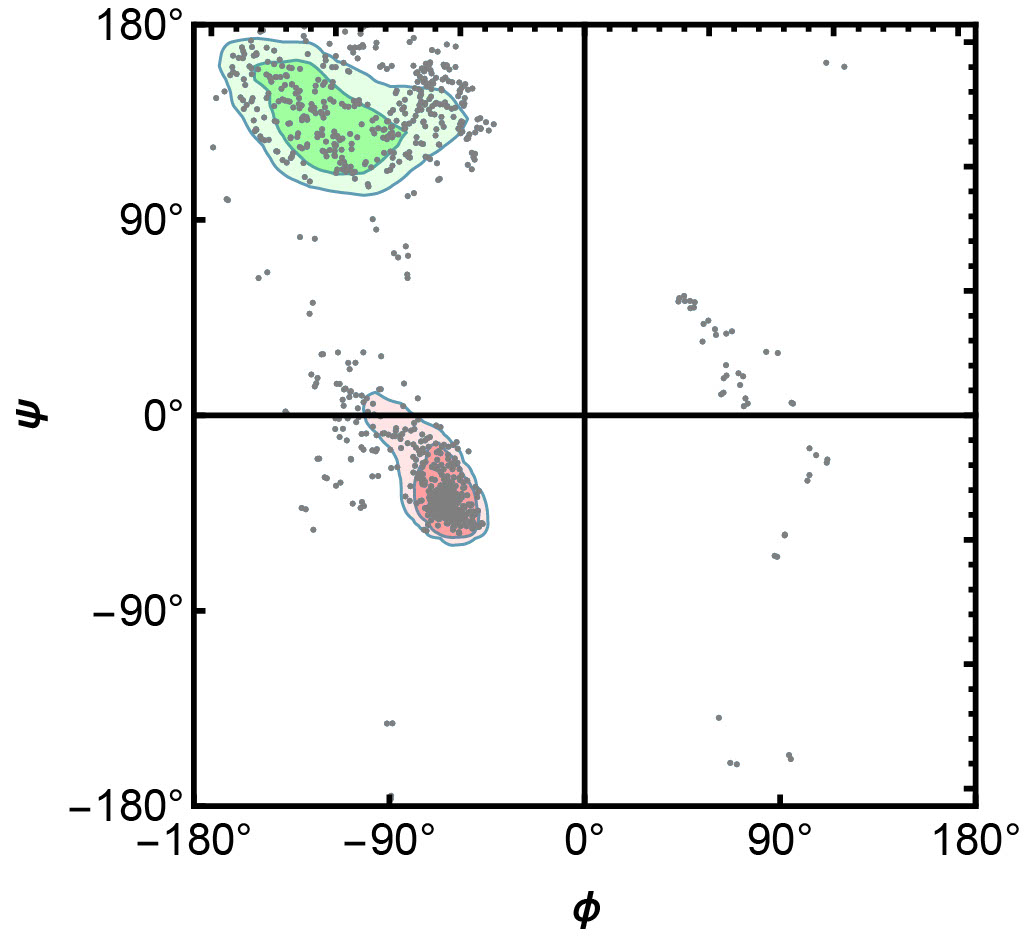
Ramachandran plot for the RIOX1 protein, crystal structure of human NO66

== Clinical significance ==
The expression of RIOX1 is linked to cancer potential. It is found to be over-expressed in lung carcinomas. Expression of the gene is shown to correlate with increases in the levels of malignant potential of renal cell tumors and colorectal cancer. Expression of the gene has also been shown to initiates prostate cancer cell growth.

Researchers at the German Cancer Research Center sequenced Xenopus laevis oocytes to examine this gene, with the results showing association with large preribosomal particles (>60S), suggesting that the gene plays a role in the assembly and processing of ribosomal subunits.

Investigation into the RIOX1 gene at The University of Texas MD Anderson Cancer Center on mouse embryos shows evidence that over-expression of the gene is associated with osteoporosis in adult mice. Ablation of the RIOX1 gene in cells of the Prx1-expressing mesenchymal (related to embryonic connective tissue) lineage causes an acceleration of osteochondrogenic (bone or cartilage forming) differentiation and a larger skeleton in adult mice, whereas mesenchyme-specific over-expression of RIOX1 inhibits formation of bone and cartilage resulting in dwarfism and osteopenia. RIOX1 is a chromatin modifier and negatively regulates mesenchymal progenitor differentiation, as well as Osterix activity.

Research into oncogenic and osteolytic functions of RIOX1 in castration-resistant prostate cancer showed upregulated levels of the gene in advanced primary prostate tumors compared to normal tissue or tumors with low Gleason scores. Forced expression of RIOX1 promoted cell survival and invasion of prostate cancer cells. In contrast, knockdown of RIOX1 resulted in decreased cell survival and increased sensitivity to the chemotherapy medication docetaxel.

== Other research ==
Analysis of healthy human hematopoietic cells compared to Acute Myeloid Leukemia cell lines found that expression levels of RIOX1 closely correlates with the malignant potential of colorectal cancer and renal cell tumors. Acute Myeloid Leukemia (AML) is caused by the malignant transformation of hematopoietic (blood forming) stem cells, in cases of loss of differentiation and uncontrolled proliferation. The RIOX1 gene was not present in the AML KG1/ KG1a cell lines, and researchers found that the lack of the gene in these cells is due to hyper-methylation of the promoter. This is referred to as a "stem cell-like" system. Ectopic (unusual) expression of RIOX1 in KG1a cells inhibits proliferation and rDNA transcription. The gene impacts the transition from stem cells to progenitors (differentiated cells) by modification or regulation of gene expression.

There is evidence that the loss of the RIOX1 restores cell proliferation and reduces cell death after exposure to ionizing radiation. Radiation causes damage to DNA, and influence of epigenetic modifications affect the efficiency of repair to DNA. DNA damage is cytotoxic and becomes lethal when not repaired.Double strand breaks are harmful, and can be repaired through homologous recombination or nonhomologous end-joining. Removal of the RIOX1 gene improves levels of homologous recombination repair but not nonhomologous end-joining repair in irradiated oral mucosal epithelial cells and irradiated bone marrow cells. High expression of RIOX1 maintains methylation of the cyclic GMP-AMP synthase (cGAS) protein at lysine residue 491 at a low level, and therefore impedes homologous recombination repair and decreases cellular tolerance to ionizing radiation. A RIOX1 dependent mechanism involved in the function of this cGAS enzyme is necessary for the regulation of ionizing radiation-elicited homologous recombination repair. RIOX1 was also shown to abolish the monomethylation of K491 in cGAS, disrupting interactions between cGAS and SGF29. Without the K491 monomethylation, cGAS binds to poly(ADP-ribosyl)ated poly(ADP-ribose) polymerase 1 and blocks homologous recombination repair.

Research at the Shanghai Synchrotron Radiation Facility purified the RIOX1 protein in order to determine the structure, perform GST pull-down assay, hydroxylation activity analysis, size-exclusion chromatography, and isothermal titration calorimetry. Results indicated that oligomerization is essential in the function if catalytic activity in the protein. Results also indicated that tetramerization is required for the protein to catalyze hydroxylation effectively.
