= Tooth and nail syndrome =

- This condition is inherited in an autosomal dominant manner.
- Specialty: Medical genetics

Tooth and nail syndrome (also known as hypodontia with nail dysgenesis, Witkop syndrome, or mucoepithelial dysplasia syndrome) is a rare disorder, first described in 1965, characterized by nails that are thin, small, and friable, and which may show koilonychia at birth. It was named after Dr. Carl J. Witkop Jr., who first described it between 1978 and 1982. It is an autosomal dominant type of ectodermal dysplasia. Its estimated incidence is 2 in 10,000.

It is associated with MSX1.

== See also ==
- Skin lesion
- List of cutaneous conditions
