= Sp7 transcription factor =

Protein-coding gene in the species Homo sapiens

SP7

Identifiers
- Aliases: SP7, OI11, OI12, OSX, osterix, Sp7 transcription factor
- External IDs: OMIM: 606633; MGI: 2153568; GeneCards: SP7

Gene location (Human)
| Chr. | Chromosome 12 (human) |
| Band | 12q13.13 | Start | 53,326,575 bp |
| Band | 12q13.13 | End | 53,345,315 bp |

Gene location (Mouse)
| Chr. | Chromosome 15 (mouse) |
| Band | 15|15 F3 | Start | 102,265,041 bp |
| Band | 15|15 F3 | End | 102,275,617 bp |
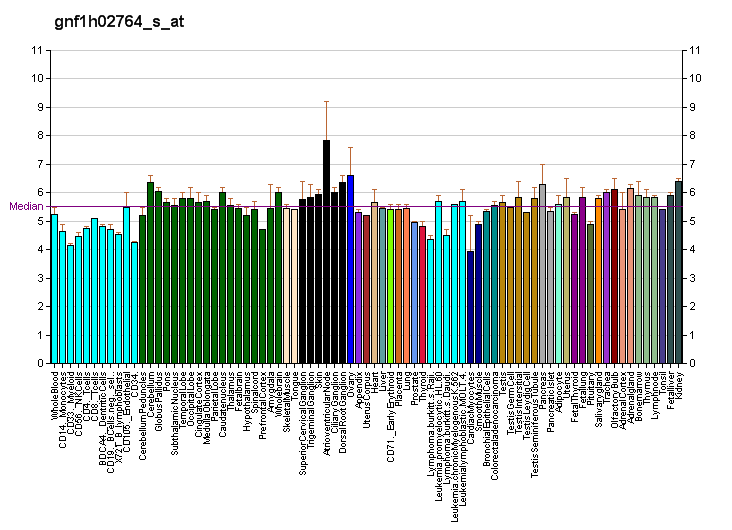
RNA expression pattern
| Bgee | Human / Mouse (ortholog); Top expressed in: gonad; tibia; testicle; trabecular bone; prefrontal cortex; C1 segment; amygdala; Brodmann area 9; anterior cingulate cortex; right lobe of thyroid gland / Top expressed in: dental pulp; body of femur; right ventricle; calvaria; molar; alveolar ridge; portion of substance of tooth; radice; gastrula; tibiofemoral joint; More reference expression data |
| BioGPS | More reference expression data |
Gene ontology
| Molecular function | nucleic acid binding; RNA polymerase II cis-regulatory region sequence-specific DNA binding; DNA-binding transcription activator activity, RNA polymerase II-specific; DNA binding; DEAD/H-box RNA helicase binding; metal ion binding; DNA-binding transcription factor activity, RNA polymerase II-specific |
| Cellular component | nucleus; cytoplasm |
| Biological process | osteoblast differentiation; transcription, DNA-templated; regulation of transcription, DNA-templated; regulation of transcription by RNA polymerase II; transcription by RNA polymerase II; positive regulation of transcription by RNA polymerase II; hematopoietic stem cell differentiation; positive regulation of stem cell differentiation |
Sources:Amigo / QuickGO
Orthologs
| Databases | NCBI: entry; OMA: entry |
| Species | Human | Mouse |
| Entrez | 121340 | 170574 |
| Ensembl | ENSG00000170374 | ENSMUSG00000060284 |
| UniProt | Q8TDD2 | Q8VI67 |
| RefSeq (mRNA) | NM_001173467; NM_001300837; NM_152860 | NM_130458; NM_001348205 |
| RefSeq (protein) | NP_001287766.1; NP_001166938; NP_001287766; NP_690599 | NP_569725; NP_001335134 |
| Location (UCSC) | Chr 12: 53.33 – 53.35 Mb | Chr 15: 102.27 – 102.28 Mb |
| PubMed search |
- Wikidata
| View/Edit Human | View/Edit Mouse |

Transcription factor Sp7, also called Osterix (Osx), is a protein that in humans is encoded by the SP7 gene. It is a member of the Sp family of zinc-finger transcription factors It is highly conserved among bone-forming vertebrate species It plays a major role, along with Runx2 and Dlx5 in driving the differentiation of mesenchymal precursor cells into osteoblasts and eventually osteocytes. Sp7 also plays a regulatory role by inhibiting chondrocyte differentiation maintaining the balance between differentiation of mesenchymal precursor cells into ossified bone or cartilage. Mutations of this gene have been associated with multiple dysfunctional bone phenotypes in vertebrates. During development, a mouse embryo model with Sp7 expression knocked out had no formation of bone tissue. Through the use of GWAS studies, the Sp7 locus in humans has been strongly associated with bone mass density. In addition there is significant genetic evidence for its role in diseases such as Osteogenesis imperfecta (OI).

== Genetics ==
In humans Sp7 has been mapped to 12q13.13. It has 78% homology to another Sp family member, Sp1, especially in the regions which code for the three Cys-2 His-2 type DNA-binding zinc fingers. Sp7 consists of three exons the first two of which are alternatively spliced, encoding a 431-residue isoform and an amino-terminus truncated 413-residue short protein isoform

A GWAS study has found that bone mass density (BMD) is associated with the Sp7 locus, adults and children with either low or high BMD were analyzed showing that several common variant SNPs within the 12q13 region were in an area of linkage disequilibrium.

== Transcriptional pathway ==
There are two main pathways which cause in the induction of Sp7/Osx gene expression. Msx2 induces Sp7 directly, whereas bone morphogenetic protein 2 (BMP2) induces it indirectly through either Dlx5 or Runx2. Once Sp7 expression is triggered, it then induces the expression of a slew of mature osteoblast genes such as Col1a1, osteonectin, osteopontin and bone sialoprotein which are all necessary for productive osteoblasts during the creation of ossified bone.

Negative regulation of this pathway comes in the form of p53, microRNAs and the TNF inflammatory pathway. Disregulation of the TNF pathway blocking appropriate bone growth by osteoblasts is a partial cause of the abnormal degradation of bone seen in osteoporosis or rheumatoid arthritis

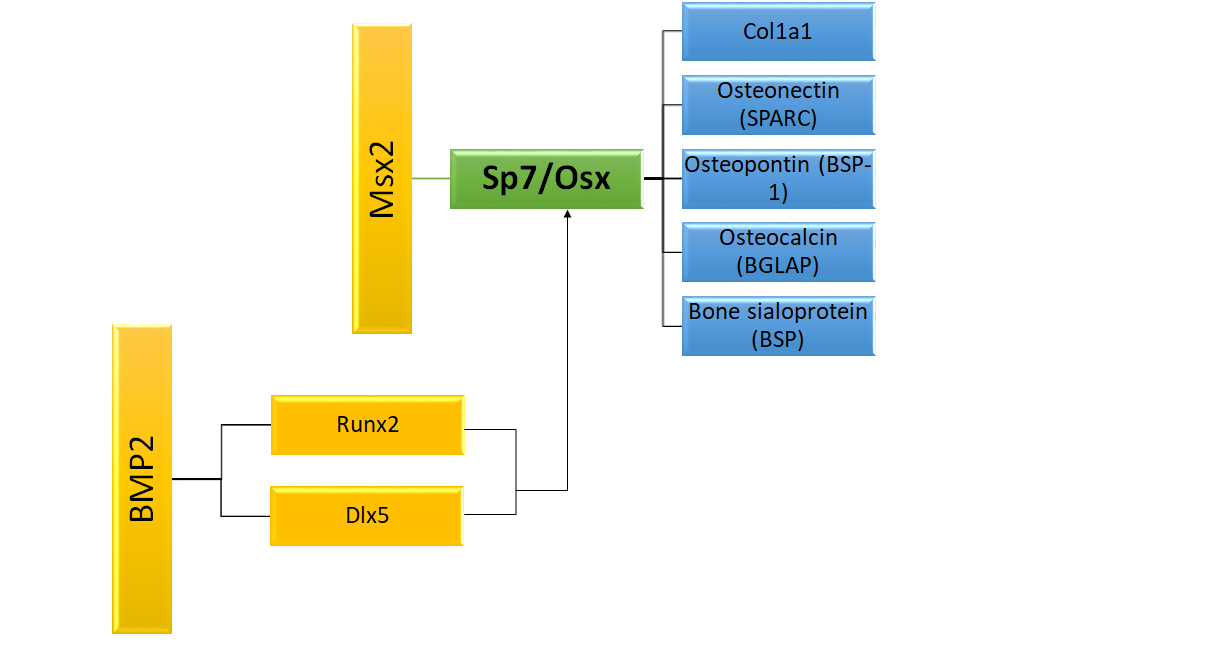
Diagram detailing the positive regulatory transcriptional pathway between genes expressed early in development such as BMP2 and the eventual expression of bone-specific genes.

== Mechanism of action ==
The exact mechanisms of action for Sp7/Osterix are currently in contention and the full protein structure has yet to be solved. As a zinc-finger transcription factor, its relatively high homology with Sp1 seems to indicate that it might act in a similar fashion during gene regulatory processes. Previous studies done on Sp1 have shown that Sp1 utilizes the zinc-finger DNA binding domains in its structure to bind directly to a GC-rich region of the genome known as the GC box. creating downstream regulatory effects. There are a number of studies which support this mechanism as also applicable for Sp7, however other researchers were unable to replicate the GC box binding seen in Sp1 when looking at Sp7. Another proposed mechanism of action is indirect gene regulation through the protein known as homeobox transcription factor Dlx5. This is plausible because Dlx5 has much higher affinity to AT-rich gene regulatory regions than Sp7 has been shown to have to the GC box thus providing an alternate methodology through which regulation can occur.

Mass spectrometry and proteomics methods have shown that Sp7 also interacts with RNA helicase A and is possibly negatively regulated by RIOX1 both of which provide evidence for regulatory mechanisms outside of the GC box paradigm.

== Function ==
Sp7 acts as a master regulator of bone formation during both embryonic development and during the homeostatic maintenance of bone in adulthood.

=== During development ===
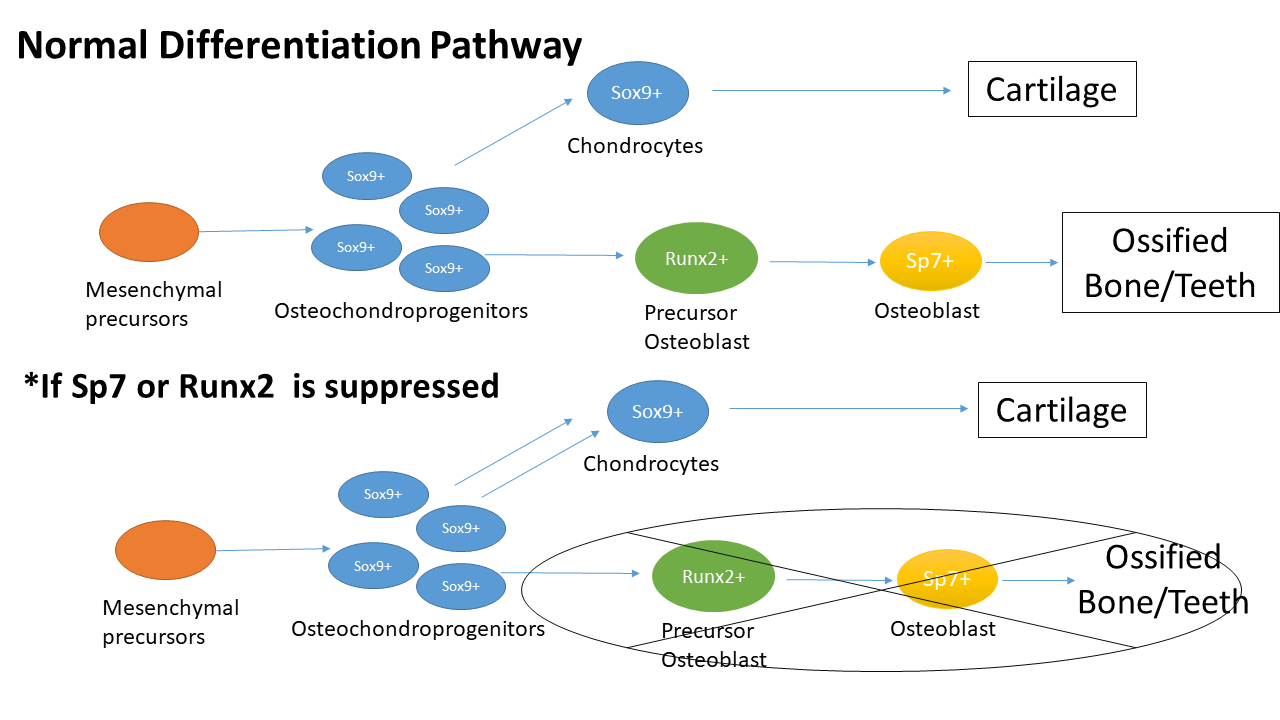
Diagram detailing the role of Sp7 in the differentiation pathway of osteoblasts and the decision pathway between cartilage and ossified bone

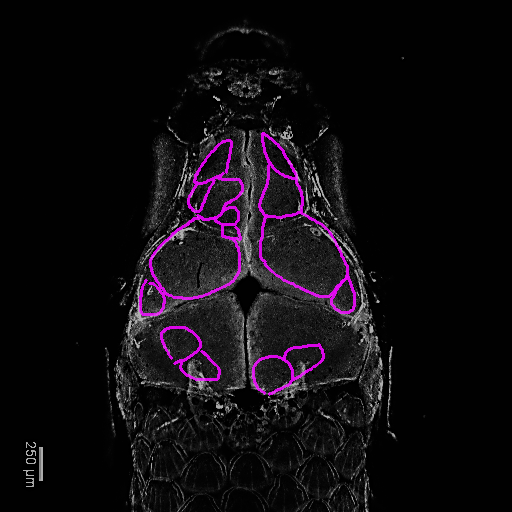
Zebrafish skull, 34 days post-fertilication, imaged using a calcein stain showing normal frontal and parietal bones. Overlaid using fuchsia are irregular initiation sites of bone formation seen in an Sp7 mutant fish indicating abnormal pseudo-sutures.

In a developing organism, Sp7 serves as one of the most important regulatory shepherds for bone formation. The creation of ossified bone is preceded by the differentiation of mesenchymal stem cells into chondrocytes and the conversion of some of those chondrocytes into cartilage. Certain populations of that initial cartilage serves as a template for bone cells as skeletogenesis proceeds.

Sp7/Osx null mouse embryos displayed a severe phenotype in which there were unaffected chondrocytes and cartilage but absolutely no formation of bone tissue. Ablation of Sp7 genes also led to decreased expression of various other osteocyte-specific markers such as: Sost, Dkk1, Dmp1, and Phe. The close relationship between Sp7/Osx and Runx2 was also demonstrated through this particular experiment because the Sp7 knockout bone phenotype greatly resembled that of the Runx2 knockout, and further experiments proved that Sp7 is downstream of and very closely associated with Runx2. The important conclusion of this particular series of experiments was the clear regulatory role of Sp7 in the decision process made by mesenchymal stem cells to progress from their original highly Sox9 positive osteoprogenitors into either bone or cartilage. Without sustained Sp7 expression the progenitor cells take the pathway into becoming chondrocytes and eventually cartilage rather than creating ossified bone.

=== In adult organisms ===
Outside of the context of development, in adult mice ablation of Sp7 led to a lack of new bone formation, highly irregular cartilage accumulation beneath the growth plate and defects in osteocyte maturation and functionality. Other studies observed that a conditional knockout of Sp7 in adult mice osteoblasts resulted in osteopenia in the vertebrae of the animals, issues with bone turnover and more porosity in cortical outer surface of the long bones of the body. Observation of an opposite effect, overproliferation of Sp7+ osteoblasts, further supports the important regulatory effects of Sp7 in vertebrates. A mutation in the zebrafish homologue of Sp7 caused severe craniofacial irregularities in maturing organisms while leaving the rest of the skeleton largely unaffected. Instead of normal suture patterning along the developing skull, the affected organisms displayed a mosaic of sites where bone formation was being initiated but not completed. This caused the appearance of many small irregular bones instead of the normal smooth frontal and parietal bones. These phenotypic shifts corresponded to an overproliferation of Runx2+ osteoblast progenitors indicating that the phenotype observed was related to an abundance of initiation sites for bone proliferation creating many pseudo-sutures.

== Clinical relevance ==
=== Osteogenesis imperfecta ===
The most direct example of the role of Sp7 in human disease has been in recessive osteogenesis imperfecta (OI), which is a type-I collagen related disease that causes a heterogeneous set of bone-related symptoms which can range from mild to very severe. Generally this disease is caused by mutations in Col1a1 or Col1a2 which are regulators of collagen growth. OI-causing mutations in these collagen genes are generally heritable in an autosomal-dominant fashion. However, there has been a recent case of a patient with recessive OI with a documented frameshift mutation in Sp7/Osx as the etiological origin of the disease. This patient displayed abnormal fracturing of the bones after relatively minor injuries and markedly delayed motor milestones, requiring assistance to stand at age 6 and was unable to walk at age 8 due to pronounced bowing of the arms and legs. This provides a direct link between the Sp7 gene and the OI disease phenotype.

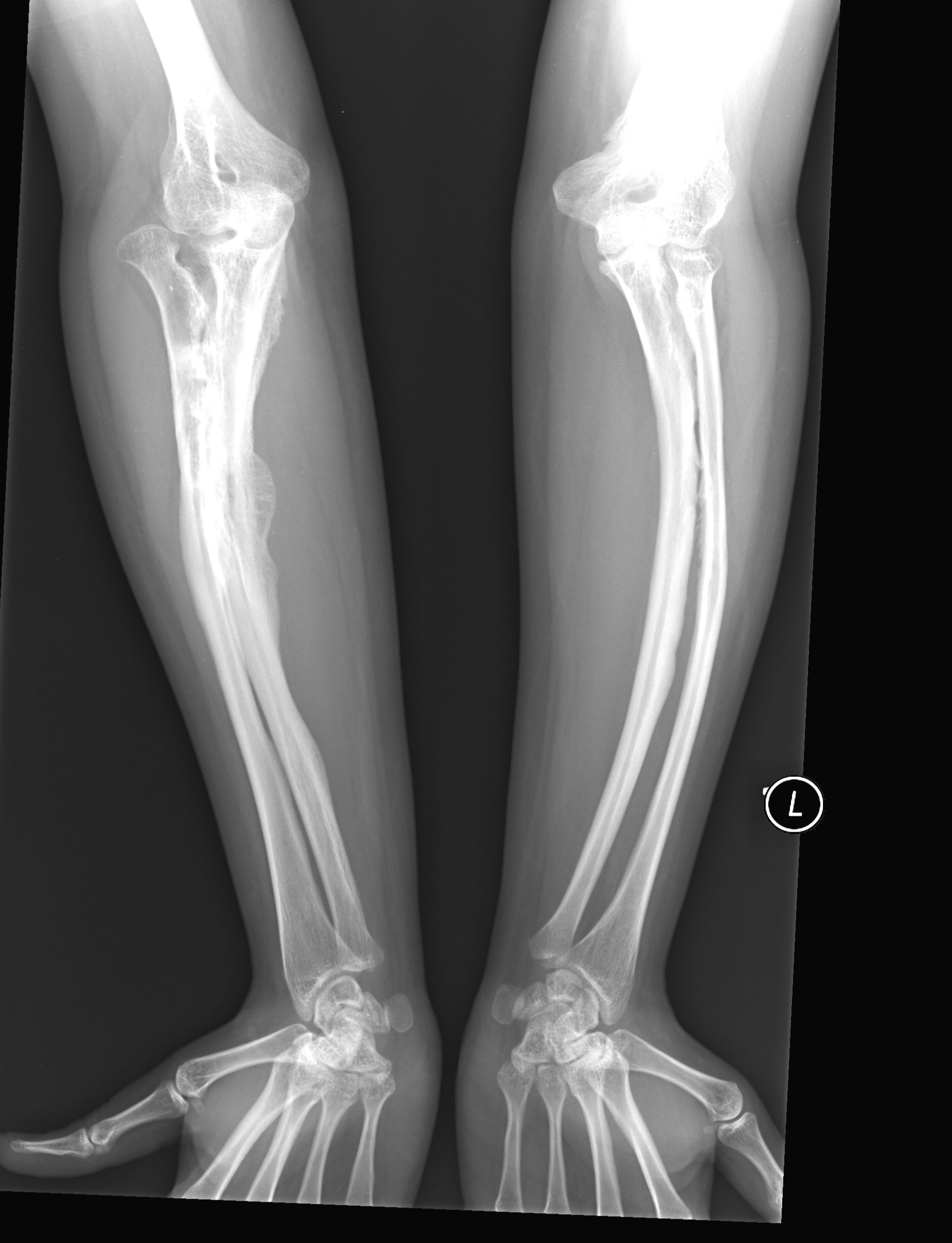
Bowed bones of the arms as seen in an adult osteogenesis imperfecta patient.

=== Osteoporosis ===
GWAS studies have shown associations between adult and juvenile bone mass density (BMD) and the Sp7 locus in humans. Though low BMD is a good indicator of susceptibility for osteoporosis in adults, the amount of information currently available from these studies does not allow for a direct correlation to be made between osteoporosis and Sp7. Abnormal expression of inflammatory cytokines such as TNF-α is present in osteoporosis can have detrimental effects on the expression of Sp7.

=== Rheumatoid Arthritis ===
Adiponectin is a protein hormone that has been shown to be upregulated in rheumatoid arthritis disease pathology, causing the release of inflammatory cytokines and enhancing the breakdown of the bone matrix. In primary human cell cultures Sp7 was shown to be inhibited by adiponectin thus contributing downregulation of the creation of ossified bone. This data is further backed up by another study in which inflammatory cytokines such as TNF-α and IL-1β were shown to downregulate gene expression of Sp7 in mouse primary mesenchymal stem cells in culture. These studies seem to indicate that an inflammatory environment is detrimental to the creation of ossified bone.

=== Bone fracture repair ===
Accelerated bone fracture healing was found when researchers implanted Sp7 overexpressing bone marrow stroma cells at a site of bone fracture. It was found that the mechanism by which Sp7 expression accelerated bone healing was through triggering new bone formation by inducing neighboring cells to express genes characteristic of bone progenitors. Along similar mechanistic lines as bone repair is the integration of dental implants into alveolar bone, since the insertion of these implants causes bone damage that must be healed before the implant is successfully integrated. Researchers have shown that when bone marrow stromal cells are exposed to artificially elevated levels of Sp7/Osx, mice with dental implants were shown to have better outcomes through the promotion of healthy bone regeneration.

=== Treatment of osteosarcomas ===
Overall Sp7 expression is decreased in mouse and human osteosarcoma cell lines when compared to endogenous osteoblasts and this decrease in expression correlates with metastatic potential. Transfection of the SP7 gene into a mouse osteosarcoma cell line to create higher levels of expression reduced overall malignancy in-vitro and reduced tumor incidence, tumor volume, and lung metastasis when the cells were injected into mice. Sp7 expression was also found to decrease bone destruction by the sarcoma likely through supplementing the normal regulatory pathways controlling osteoblasts and osteocytes.
