= Parietal foramina =

Small opening in the skull

Parietal foramen
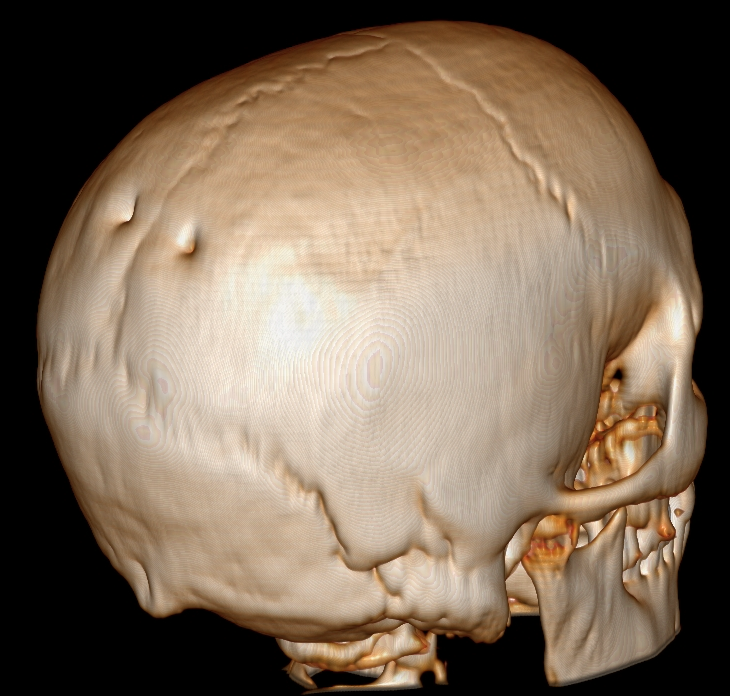
- Surface rendered CT of the back of the skull. The parietal foramina are visible at left.

Details
- Part of: Parietal bone
- System: Skeletal

Identifiers
- Latin: foramen parietale
- TA98: A02.1.02.019
- TA2: 519
- FMA: 53145

A parietal foramen is an opening in the skull for the parietal emissary vein, which drains into the superior sagittal sinus. Occasionally, a small branch of the occipital artery can also pass through it. Each foramen is located at the back part of the parietal bone, close to the upper or sagittal border. It is not always present, and its size varies considerably. Parietal foramina are most commonly bilaterally symmetrical, with the same number on each side, although they may exist as a single foramen found on only one of the parietal bones.

== Foramina Parietalia Permagna ==
Foramina Parietalia Permagna (FPP), also referred to as Giant Parietal Foramina or Catlin Marks, refer to a rare condition in which the opening of the foramen or foramina are greater than 5mm in diameter. It has an incidence rate of between 1 in 15,000 and 1 in 25,000. FPP is largely an autosomal dominant heritable condition associated with the MSX2 or ALX4 genes.

FPP is often asymptomatic, but it is also associated with headaches, nausea and intellectual disability. It is rarely associated with malformations including craniosynostosis, cortical dysplasia, microcephaly, eye and ear abnormalities, craniofacial abnormalities or cerebrovascular abnormalities.

== See also ==
- Foramina of skull
