= Msh homeobox 2 =

Protein found in humans

MSX2
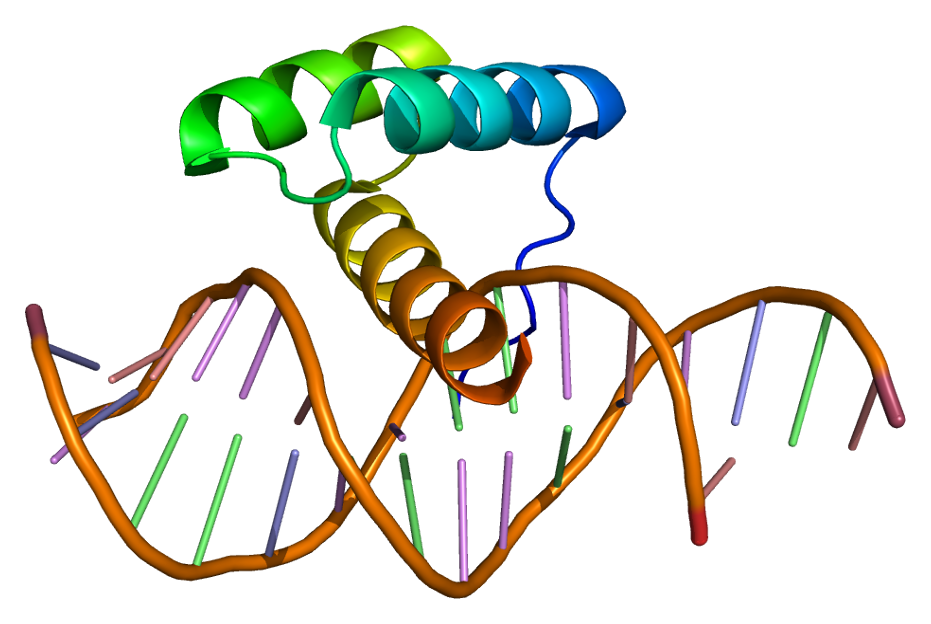

Identifiers
- Aliases: MSX2, CRS2, FPP, HOX8, MSH, PFM, PFM1, Msh homeobox 2
- External IDs: OMIM: 123101; MGI: 97169; GeneCards: MSX2

Gene location (Human)
Chr.	Chromosome 5 (human)
Band	5q35.2	Start	174,724,582 bp
Band	5q35.2	End	174,730,896 bp
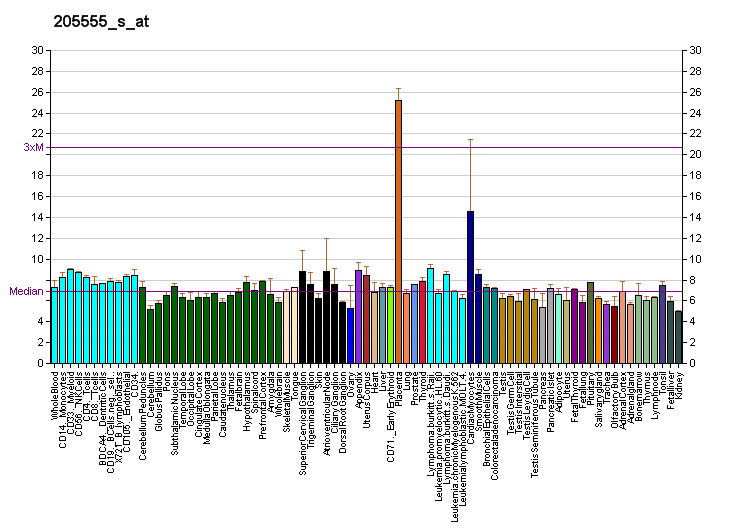

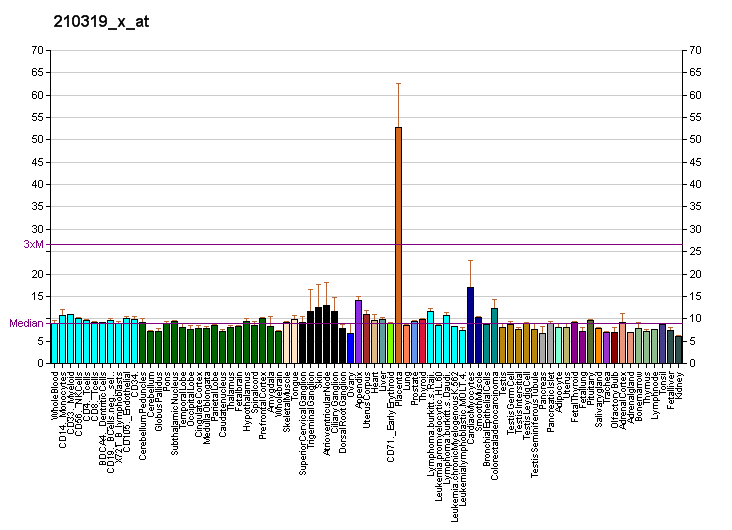
RNA expression pattern
Bgee	Human / Mouse (ortholog); Top expressed in: placenta; secondary oocyte; testicle; lactiferous duct; urinary bladder; tibial arteries; gonad; mucosa of urinary bladder; skin of abdomen; muscle of thigh / n/a; More reference expression data
BioGPS	More reference expression data
Gene ontology
Molecular function	sequence-specific DNA binding; DNA binding; transcription coregulator activity; DNA-binding transcription repressor activity, RNA polymerase II-specific; RNA polymerase II transcription regulatory region sequence-specific DNA binding; protein binding; transcription factor binding; DNA-binding transcription factor activity, RNA polymerase II-specific
Cellular component	nucleus; cytosol; nuclear speck
Biological process	negative regulation of cell population proliferation; positive regulation of timing of catagen; negative regulation of keratinocyte differentiation; negative regulation of transcription regulatory region DNA binding; embryonic limb morphogenesis; frontal suture morphogenesis; mammary gland epithelium development; BMP signaling pathway involved in heart development; enamel mineralization; ossification; anterior/posterior pattern specification; bone morphogenesis; regulation of transcription, DNA-templated; cellular response to growth factor stimulus; activation of meiosis; endochondral bone growth; wound healing, spreading of epidermal cells; BMP signaling pathway; embryonic digit morphogenesis; positive regulation of mesenchymal cell apoptotic process; multicellular organism development; embryonic hindlimb morphogenesis; negative regulation of CREB transcription factor activity; outflow tract morphogenesis; bone trabecula formation; wound healing; regulation of apoptotic process; chondrocyte development; osteoblast development; positive regulation of osteoblast differentiation; cranial suture morphogenesis; negative regulation of fat cell differentiation; branching involved in mammary gland duct morphogenesis; outflow tract septum morphogenesis; negative regulation of transcription, DNA-templated; osteoblast differentiation; epithelial to mesenchymal transition involved in endocardial cushion formation; positive regulation of BMP signaling pathway; signal transduction involved in regulation of gene expression; cellular response to estradiol stimulus; embryonic forelimb morphogenesis; embryonic nail plate morphogenesis; negative regulation of apoptotic process; cartilage development; stem cell differentiation; odontogenesis; transcription, DNA-templated; negative regulation of transcription by RNA polymerase II; embryonic morphogenesis
Sources:Amigo / QuickGO
Orthologs
Databases	NCBI: entry; OMA: entry
Species	Human	Mouse
Entrez	4488	17702
Ensembl	ENSG00000120149	n/a
UniProt	P35548	Q03358
RefSeq (mRNA)	NM_002449; NM_001363626	NM_013601
RefSeq (protein)	NP_002440; NP_001350555	NP_038629
Location (UCSC)	Chr 5: 174.72 – 174.73 Mb	n/a
PubMed search
- Wikidata
View/Edit Human	View/Edit Mouse

Homeobox protein MSX-2 is a protein that in humans is encoded by the MSX2 gene.

== Function ==
This gene encodes a member of the muscle segment homeobox gene family. The encoded protein is a transcriptional repressor whose normal activity may establish a balance between survival and apoptosis of neural crest-derived cells required for proper craniofacial morphogenesis. The encoded protein may also have a role in promoting cell growth under certain conditions and may be an important target for the RAS signaling pathways. Mutations in this gene are associated with parietal foramina 1 and craniosynostosis type 2. Msx2 is a homeobox gene localized on human chromosome 5 that encodes a transcription repressor and activator (MSX-2) responsible for craniofacial and limb-bud development. Cells will express msx2 when exposed to signaling molecules BMP-2 and BMP-4 in situ. It is well documented that expression of cell-cell adhesion molecules such as E-cadherins will promote structural integrity and an epithelial arrangement of cells, while expression of N-cadherin and vimentin promote mesenchymal arrangement and cell migration. Msx2 downregulates E-cadherins and upregulates N-cadherin and vimentin which indicates its role in inducing epithelial mesenchymal transition (EMT). Germline knockout mice have been created for this gene (Msx2 ±) in order to examine functional loss. Clinical studies on craniosynostosis, or the premature fusion of cranial structures, have shown the condition to be genetically linked to mutation in the msx2 homeobox gene.

== Interactions ==
Msh homeobox 2 has been shown to interact with DLX5, DLX2 and MSX1.
