= DLX6 =

Mammalian protein found in Homo sapiens

Identifiers
- Aliases: DLX6, distal-less homeobox 6
- External IDs: OMIM: 600030; MGI: 101927; GeneCards: DLX6

Gene location (Human)
| Chr. | Chromosome 7 (human) |
| Band | 7q21.3 | Start | 97,005,553 bp |
| Band | 7q21.3 | End | 97,011,040 bp |

Gene location (Mouse)
| Chr. | Chromosome 6 (mouse) |
| Band | 6 A1|6 2.83 cM | Start | 6,863,334 bp |
| Band | 6 A1|6 2.83 cM | End | 6,868,568 bp |
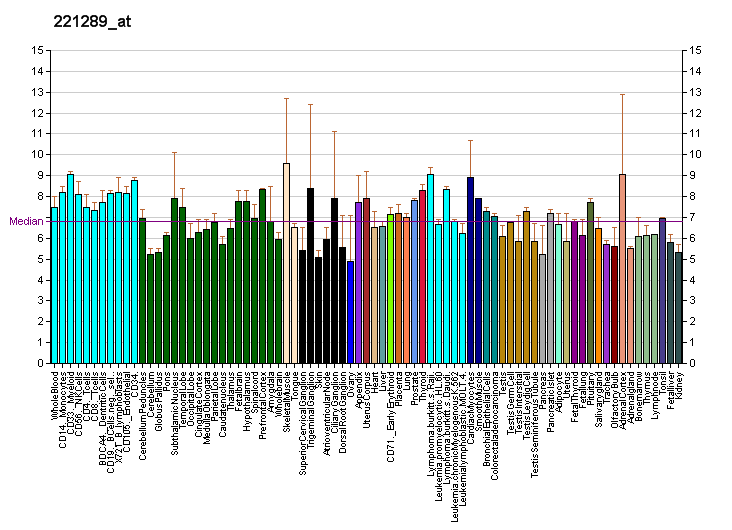
RNA expression pattern
| Bgee | Human / Mouse (ortholog); Top expressed in: buccal mucosa cell; testicle; endometrium; nucleus accumbens; caudate nucleus; putamen; gonad; oocyte; sperm; endothelial cell / Top expressed in: superior frontal gyrus; Apical ectodermal ridge; medial ganglionic eminence; lateral septal nucleus; hair; genital tubercle; primary visual cortex; olfactory tubercle; olfactory bulb; dentate gyrus of hippocampal formation granule cell; More reference expression data |
| BioGPS | More reference expression data |
Gene ontology
| Molecular function | DNA-binding transcription factor activity; sequence-specific DNA binding; DNA binding; DNA-binding transcription factor activity, RNA polymerase II-specific; RNA polymerase II cis-regulatory region sequence-specific DNA binding |
| Cellular component | nucleus |
| Biological process | skeletal system development; regulation of transcription, DNA-templated; nervous system development; embryonic limb morphogenesis; epithelial cell differentiation; inner ear morphogenesis; anatomical structure formation involved in morphogenesis; positive regulation of epithelial cell proliferation; roof of mouth development; head development; multicellular organism development; regulation of transcription by RNA polymerase II; cell differentiation; positive regulation of transcription by RNA polymerase II |
Sources:Amigo / QuickGO
Orthologs
| Databases | NCBI: entry; OMA: entry |
| Species | Human | Mouse |
| Entrez | 1750 | 13396 |
| Ensembl | ENSG00000006377 | ENSMUSG00000029754 |
| UniProt | P56179 | P70397 |
| RefSeq (mRNA) | NM_005222 | NM_010057 |
| RefSeq (protein) | NP_005213 | NP_034187 |
| Location (UCSC) | Chr 7: 97.01 – 97.01 Mb | Chr 6: 6.86 – 6.87 Mb |
| PubMed search |
- Wikidata
| View/Edit Human | View/Edit Mouse |

Homeobox protein DLX-6 is a protein that in humans is encoded by the DLX6 gene.

This gene encodes a member of a homeobox transcription factor gene family similar to the Drosophila distal-less gene. This family has at least six members that encode proteins with roles in forebrain and craniofacial development. This gene is in a tail-to-tail configuration with another member of the family, DLX5, on the long arm of chromosome 7.
