= DLX4 =

Mammalian protein found in Homo sapiens

Identifiers
- Aliases: DLX4, BP1, DLX7, DLX8, DLX9, Dlx-4, OFC15, distal-less homeobox 4
- External IDs: OMIM: 601911; MGI: 94904; GeneCards: DLX4

Gene location (Human)
Chr.	Chromosome 17 (human)
Band	17q21.33	Start	49,968,970 bp
Band	17q21.33	End	49,974,959 bp

Gene location (Mouse)
Chr.	Chromosome 11 (mouse)
Band	11 D|11 59.01 cM	Start	95,031,273 bp
Band	11 D|11 59.01 cM	End	95,037,089 bp
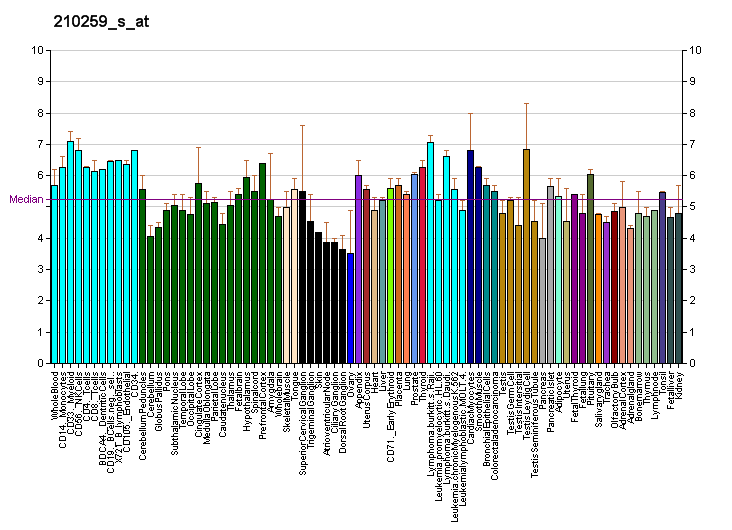

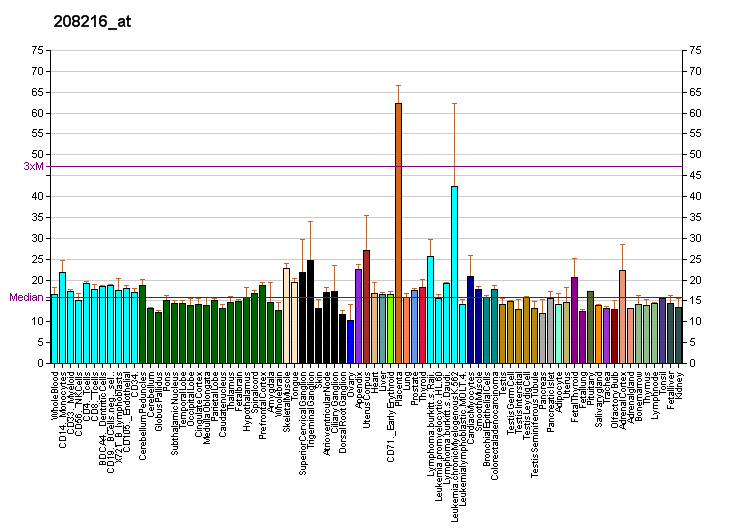
RNA expression pattern
Bgee	Human / Mouse (ortholog); Top expressed in: buccal mucosa cell; tendon of biceps brachii; synovial joint; testicle; periodontal fiber; synovial membrane; placenta; frontal pole; pancreatic ductal cell; skin of leg / Top expressed in: hair follicle; molar; stellate reticulum; embryo; lumbar subsegment of spinal cord; embryo; lip; Apical ectodermal ridge; spermatid; mandibular prominence; More reference expression data
BioGPS	More reference expression data
Gene ontology
Molecular function	DNA binding; protein binding; RNA polymerase II cis-regulatory region sequence-specific DNA binding; DNA-binding transcription repressor activity, RNA polymerase II-specific; DNA-binding transcription factor activity; sequence-specific DNA binding; DNA-binding transcription factor activity, RNA polymerase II-specific
Cellular component	nucleus
Biological process	multicellular organism development; negative regulation of transcription by RNA polymerase II; regulation of transcription, DNA-templated; regulation of transcription by RNA polymerase II
Sources:Amigo / QuickGO
Orthologs
Databases	NCBI: entry; OMA: entry
Species	Human	Mouse
Entrez	1748	13394
Ensembl	ENSG00000108813	ENSMUSG00000020871
UniProt	Q92988	P70436
RefSeq (mRNA)	NM_001934; NM_138281	NM_007867
RefSeq (protein)	NP_001925; NP_612138	NP_031893
Location (UCSC)	Chr 17: 49.97 – 49.97 Mb	Chr 11: 95.03 – 95.04 Mb
PubMed search
- Wikidata
View/Edit Human	View/Edit Mouse

Homeobox protein DLX-4 is a protein that in humans is encoded by the DLX4 gene.

== Function ==
Many vertebrate homeobox-containing genes have been identified on the basis of their sequence similarity with Drosophila developmental genes. Members of the Dlx gene family contain a homeobox that is related to that of Distal-less (Dll), a gene expressed in the head and limbs of the developing fruit fly. The Distal-less (Dlx) family of genes comprises at least 6 different members, DLX1-DLX6. The DLX proteins are postulated to play a role in forebrain and craniofacial development. Three transcript variants have been described for this gene, however, the full length nature of one variant has not been described. Studies of the two splice variants revealed that one encoded isoform (BP1) functions as a repressor of the beta-globin gene while the other isoform lacks that function.
