= Taurodontism =

Molar condition in which the root is relatively short

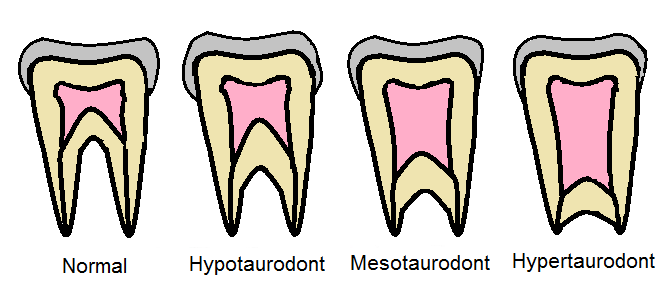
- Specialty: Dentistry

Taurodontism is defined as the enlargement of pulp chambers with the furcation area being displaced toward the apex of the root of a tooth. It cannot be diagnosed clinically and requires radiographic visualization since the crown of a taurodontic tooth appears normal and its distinguishing features are present below the alveolar margin. Taurodontism can present in deciduous or permanent dentition, unilaterally or bilaterally, but is most common in the permanent molar teeth of humans. The underlying mechanism of taurodontism is the failure or late invagination of Hertwig's epithelial root sheath, which leads an apical shift of the root furcation.

== Classification ==
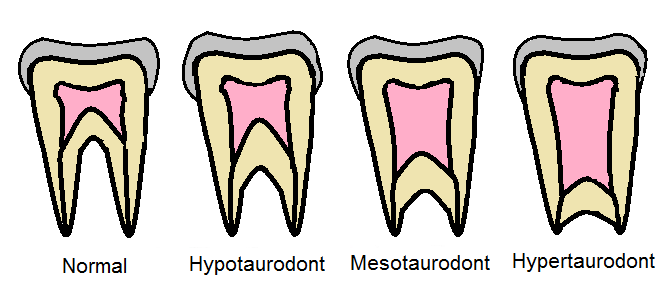
Taurodontism Shaw

The term was coined by Sir Arthur Keith. It comes from the Latin taurus meaning "bull" and the Greek ὀδούς (odous), genitive singular ὀδόντος (odontos) meaning "tooth", to indicate the similarity of these teeth to those of hoofed/ungulates, or cud-chewing animals.

Radiographic characteristics of taurodontism include:

1. lack of pulp chamber constriction at the cementoenamel junction (CEJ);
2. an enlarged pulp chamber that appears rectangular in shape; and
3. displacement of the pulp chamber floor toward the root apex, shortening the roots and root canals.

Earlier classification systems considered only the apical displacement of the pulp chamber floor; whereas, later systems additionally consider the position of the pulp chamber in relation to the cemento-enamel junction and alveolar margin.

=== Shaw 1928 ===
One of the first attempts to classify taurodontism was made by C.J.Shaw. He used the apical displacement of the pulp chamber floor to classify taurodontism into four distinct categories: cynodont (normal), hypotaurodont, hypertaurodont, and mesotaurodont.

=== Shifman & Chanannel 1978 ===
Later, Shifman & Chanannel quantified the degree of taurodontism based on a mathematical formula relating the anatomical landmarks as shown in the figure above. The anatomical landmark ratio is calculated as shown below:

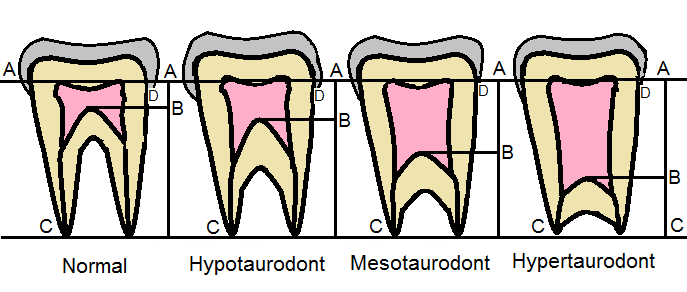
Shiffman and ChanannelA: Lowest point of the roof of the pulp chamber. B: Highest point of the floor of the pulp chamber. C: Root apex. D: Cementoenamel junction (CEJ).

==== Landmark ratio ====
$\text{Landmark ratio} = \frac{\text{distance from A to B}}{\text{distance from B to C}}$

Where, A = the lowest point of the pulp chamber roof, B = the highest point of the pulp chamber floor, and C = the longest root’s apex.

Using this formula, a tooth is a taurodont if the landmark ratio is ≥ 0.2 and the distance from the highest point of the pulp chamber floor (B) to the cemento-enamel junction (D) is ≥ 2.5 mm. The full classification system based on this formula are displayed in the table below:

Classification	Landmark ratio
Normal	< 0.2
Hypo-taurodont	≥ 0.2 - 0.209
Meso-taurodont	≥ 0.3 - 0.399
Hyper-taurodont	≥ 0.4 - 0.75

Historically, there has been professional debate regarding the taurodont classification systems as to: 1) how much displacement and/or morphologic change constitutes taurodontism, 2) whether classification should be indexed stepwise or on a continuum, and 3) whether to include certain teeth in the occurrence of taurodontism. For example, as premolars are narrow mesio-distally, taurodontism is hard to identify radiographically on premolars. Therefore, some researchers exclude premolars from their classification systems. Additionally, there has been criticism over the use of landmarks that undergo changes. For example, due to trauma or wear, tertiary dentin can be deposited which can then alter some measurements; thus, caution should be employed when diagnosing taurodontism in this case. Finally, as these measurements are dimensionally quite small, they are also subject to large relative error.

== Clinical Considerations ==
The altered morphology of taurodont teeth can present challenges during dental treatment. Most notably, endodontists will have difficulty in not only removing the voluminous pulp, but also filling the large pulp chamber and complex root canal system.

Prosthodontists and orthodontists should also exercise caution in using taurodont teeth as sites for dental anchorage. Due to the apical displacement of the furcation area, the taurodont tooth is not held as securely in the alveolar socket. Conversely, this may make taurodont teeth easier to extract.

Finally, taurodont teeth may have favorable prognosis from a periodontal point of view, as the furcation area is apical and thus less susceptible to periodontal damage.

== Anthropology ==
Taurodontism is still a condition of anthropological importance as it was seen in Neanderthals.

The trait "is common among extant New World monkeys, apes, and fossil hominins".

== Related conditions ==
Although taurodontism is frequently an isolated anomaly, it may be found in association with several other conditions such as: amelogenesis imperfecta, Down syndrome, Klinefelter syndrome, Mohr syndrome, Wolf-Hirschhorn syndrome, Lowe syndrome, ectodermal dysplasia and tricho-dento-osseous syndrome.

Taurodontism may be related to:

- A retrograde character
- A primitive pattern
- An autosomal dominant trait
- Atavistic feature
- An X-linked trait
- A mutation
