= DLX2 =

Mammalian protein found in Homo sapiens

Identifiers
- Aliases: DLX2, TES-1, TES1, AW121999, Dlx-2, distal-less homeobox 2
- External IDs: OMIM: 126255; MGI: 94902; GeneCards: DLX2

Gene location (Human)
Chr.	Chromosome 2 (human)
Band	2q31.1	Start	172,099,438 bp
Band	2q31.1	End	172,102,900 bp

Gene location (Mouse)
Chr.	Chromosome 2 (mouse)
Band	2 C2|2 42.65 cM	Start	71,373,752 bp
Band	2 C2|2 42.65 cM	End	71,377,098 bp

RNA expression pattern
Bgee	Human / Mouse (ortholog); Top expressed in: gonad; buccal mucosa cell; sperm; ganglionic eminence; periodontal fiber; pericardium; ventricular zone; Brodmann area 23; middle temporal gyrus; superior frontal gyrus / Top expressed in: Rostral migratory stream; medial ganglionic eminence; tooth; molar; tooth germ; enamel organ; olfactory bulb; hair follicle; lateral septal nucleus; enteric nervous system; More reference expression data
BioGPS	More reference expression data
Gene ontology
Molecular function	DNA binding; sequence-specific DNA binding; RNA polymerase II transcription regulatory region sequence-specific DNA binding; DNA-binding transcription factor activity; DNA-binding transcription activator activity, RNA polymerase II-specific; chromatin binding; protein binding; single-stranded RNA binding; DNA-binding transcription factor activity, RNA polymerase II-specific; RNA polymerase II cis-regulatory region sequence-specific DNA binding
Cellular component	nucleus
Biological process	cerebral cortex GABAergic interneuron differentiation; proximal/distal pattern formation; cell differentiation; regulation of transcription, DNA-templated; regulation of transcription by RNA polymerase II; negative regulation of transcription by RNA polymerase II; transcription by RNA polymerase II; branching morphogenesis of a nerve; embryonic skeletal system development; multicellular organism development; odontogenesis of dentin-containing tooth; cerebral cortex GABAergic interneuron fate commitment; cartilage development; brain development; negative regulation of oligodendrocyte differentiation; forebrain neuron differentiation; embryonic cranial skeleton morphogenesis; olfactory bulb development; hippocampus development; subpallium development; negative regulation of Notch signaling pathway; positive regulation of transcription by RNA polymerase II; positive regulation of cell differentiation; negative regulation of photoreceptor cell differentiation; positive regulation of amacrine cell differentiation; transcription, DNA-templated
Sources:Amigo / QuickGO
Orthologs
Databases	NCBI: entry; OMA: entry
Species	Human	Mouse
Entrez	1746	13392
Ensembl	ENSG00000115844	ENSMUSG00000023391
UniProt	Q07687	P40764
RefSeq (mRNA)	NM_004405	NM_010054
RefSeq (protein)	NP_004396; NP_004396.1	NP_034184
Location (UCSC)	Chr 2: 172.1 – 172.1 Mb	Chr 2: 71.37 – 71.38 Mb
PubMed search
- Wikidata
View/Edit Human	View/Edit Mouse

Homeobox protein DLX-2 is a protein that in humans is encoded by the DLX2 gene.

Many vertebrate homeo box-containing genes have been identified on the basis of their sequence similarity with Drosophila developmental genes. Members of the Dlx gene family contain a homeobox that is related to that of Distal-less (Dll), a gene expressed in the head and limbs of the developing fruit fly. The Distal-less (Dlx) family of genes comprises at least 6 different members, DLX1-DLX6. The DLX proteins are postulated to play a role in forebrain and craniofacial development. This gene is located in a tail-to-tail configuration with another member of the gene family on the long arm of chromosome 2.

== Interactions ==
DLX2 has been shown to interact with DLX5, MSX1 and Msh homeobox 2.
