= DLX1 =

Mammalian protein found in Homo sapiens

Identifiers
- Aliases: DLX1, Dlx, Dlx-1, distal-less homeobox 1
- External IDs: OMIM: 600029; MGI: 94901; GeneCards: DLX1

Gene location (Human)
Chr.	Chromosome 2 (human)
Band	2q31.1	Start	172,084,740 bp
Band	2q31.1	End	172,089,677 bp

Gene location (Mouse)
Chr.	Chromosome 2 (mouse)
Band	2 C2|2 42.61 cM	Start	71,358,457 bp
Band	2 C2|2 42.61 cM	End	71,364,325 bp
RNA expression pattern
Bgee	Human / Mouse (ortholog); Top expressed in: middle temporal gyrus; testicle; anterior cingulate cortex; endothelial cell; ganglionic eminence; prefrontal cortex; Brodmann area 23; dorsolateral prefrontal cortex; primary visual cortex; Brodmann area 9 / Top expressed in: medial ganglionic eminence; olfactory bulb; nasolacrimal duct; Rostral migratory stream; otic vesicle; otic placode; lateral septal nucleus; fossa; paraventricular nucleus of hypothalamus; maxillary prominence; More reference expression data
BioGPS	n/a
Gene ontology
Molecular function	DNA binding; sequence-specific DNA binding; RNA polymerase II transcription regulatory region sequence-specific DNA binding; chromatin binding; protein binding; DNA-binding transcription factor activity, RNA polymerase II-specific; RNA polymerase II cis-regulatory region sequence-specific DNA binding; DNA-binding transcription factor activity
Cellular component	nucleus
Biological process	negative regulation of neuron apoptotic process; cerebral cortex GABAergic interneuron differentiation; proximal/distal pattern formation; cell differentiation; regulation of transcription, DNA-templated; regulation of transcription by RNA polymerase II; embryonic skeletal system development; multicellular organism development; odontogenesis of dentin-containing tooth; cerebral cortex GABAergic interneuron fate commitment; negative regulation of oligodendrocyte differentiation; forebrain neuron differentiation; hippocampus development; subpallium development; negative regulation of Notch signaling pathway; positive regulation of cell differentiation; negative regulation of photoreceptor cell differentiation; positive regulation of amacrine cell differentiation; negative regulation of transcription by RNA polymerase II; negative regulation of BMP signaling pathway; positive regulation of transcription by RNA polymerase II; cellular response to transforming growth factor beta stimulus; cellular response to BMP stimulus; negative regulation of cellular response to transforming growth factor beta stimulus; transcription, DNA-templated
Sources:Amigo / QuickGO
Orthologs
Databases	NCBI: entry; OMA: entry
Species	Human	Mouse
Entrez	1745	13390
Ensembl	ENSG00000144355	ENSMUSG00000041911
UniProt	P56177	Q64317
RefSeq (mRNA)	NM_001038493; NM_178120	NM_010053
RefSeq (protein)	NP_001033582; NP_835221	NP_034183
Location (UCSC)	Chr 2: 172.08 – 172.09 Mb	Chr 2: 71.36 – 71.36 Mb
PubMed search
- Wikidata
View/Edit Human	View/Edit Mouse

Homeobox protein DLX-1 is a protein that in humans is encoded by the DLX1 gene.

== Function ==
This gene encodes a member of a homeobox transcription factor gene family similar to the Drosophila distal-less gene. The encoded protein is localized to the nucleus where it may function as a transcriptional regulator of signals from multiple TGF-β superfamily members. The encoded protein may play a role in the control of craniofacial patterning and the differentiation and survival of inhibitory neurons in the forebrain. This gene is located in a tail-to-tail configuration with another member of the family on the long arm of chromosome 2. Alternatively spliced transcript variants encoding different isoforms have been described.
