= Chromosome 8 =

Human chromosome

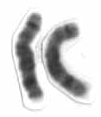
- Human chromosome 8 pair after G-banding. One is from mother, one is from father.

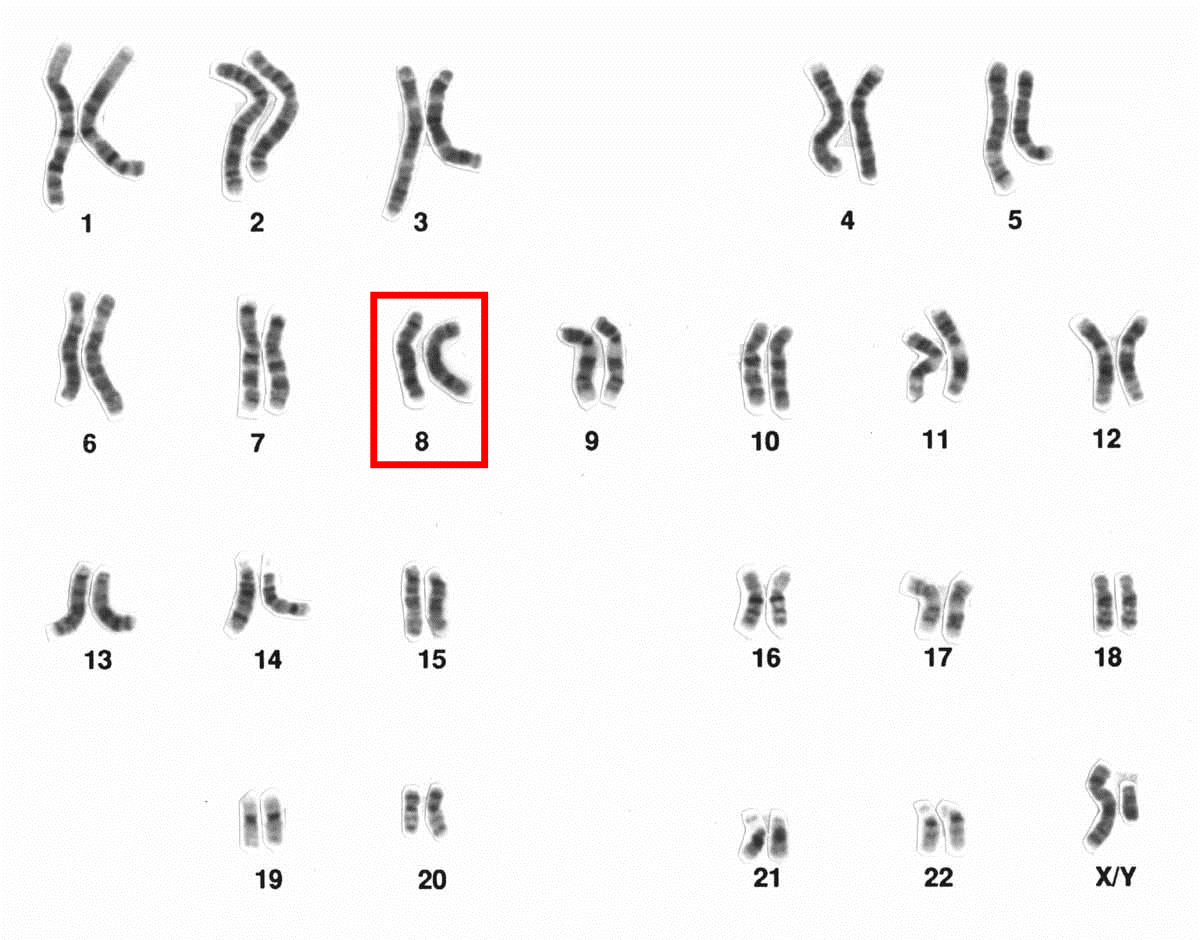
- Chromosome 8 pair in human male karyogram.

Features
- Length (bp): 146,259,331 (CHM13)
- No. of genes: 646 (CCDS)
- Type: Autosome
- Centromere position: Submetacentric (45.2 Mbp)

Complete gene lists
- CCDS: Gene list
- HGNC: Gene list
- UniProt: Gene list
- NCBI: Gene list

External map viewers
- Ensembl: Chromosome 8
- Entrez: Chromosome 8
- NCBI: Chromosome 8
- UCSC: Chromosome 8

Full DNA sequences
- RefSeq: NC_000008 (FASTA)
- GenBank: CM000670 (FASTA)

Chromosome 8 is one of the 23 pairs of chromosomes in humans. People normally have two copies of this chromosome. Chromosome 8 spans about 146 million base pairs (the building material of DNA) and represents between 4.5 and 5.0% of the total DNA in cells.

About 8% of its genes are involved in brain development and function, and about 16% are involved in cancer. A unique feature of 8p is a region of about 15 megabases that appears to have a high mutation rate. This region shows a significant divergence between human and chimpanzee, suggesting that its high mutation rates have contributed to the evolution of the human brain.

== Genes ==
=== Number of genes ===
The following are some of the gene count estimates of human chromosome 8. Because researchers use different approaches to genome annotation their predictions of the number of genes on each chromosome varies (for technical details, see gene prediction). Among various projects, the collaborative consensus coding sequence project (CCDS) takes an extremely conservative strategy. So CCDS's gene number prediction represents a lower bound on the total number of human protein-coding genes.

Estimated by	Protein-coding genes	Non-coding RNA genes	Pseudogenes	Source	Release date
CCDS	646	—	—		2016-09-08
HGNC	656	242	539		2017-05-12
Ensembl	670	1,052	613		2017-03-29
UniProt	703	—	—		2018-02-28
NCBI	719	848	682		2017-05-19

=== Gene list ===
The following is a partial list of genes on human chromosome 8. For complete list, see the link in the infobox on the right.

- ADHFE1: encoding protein Alcohol dehydrogenase, iron containing 1
- AEG1: Astrocyte Elevated Gene (linked to hepatocellular carcinoma and neuroblastoma)
- ANK1: ankyrin 1, erythrocytic
- Arc/Arg3.1
- ASAH1: N-acylsphingosine amidohydrolase (acid ceramidase) 1
- ASPH: encoding enzyme Aspartyl/asparaginyl beta-hydroxylase
- AZIN1: encoding protein Antizyme inhibitor 1
- BRF2: transcription factor IIIB 50 kDa subunit
- C8orf32/WDYHV1: encoding enzyme Protein N-terminal glutamine amidohydrolase
- C8orf33: chromosome 8, open reading frame 33
- C8orf34: chromosome 8, open reading frame 34
- C8orf4: encoding protein Uncharacterized protein C8orf4
- C8orf48: encoding protein C8orf48
- C8orf58: chromosome 8 open reading frame 58
- C8orfk29: encoding protein TMEM249
- CCAT1: colon cancer associated transcript 1
- CCDC166: encoding protein Coiled-coil domain containing 166
- CCDC25: coiled-coil domain containing protein 25
- CHD7: chromodomain helicase DNA binding protein 7
- CHMP4C: Charged multivesicular body protein 4c
- CHRAC1 encoding protein Chromatin accessibility complex 1
- CHRNA2: cholinergic receptor, nicotinic, alpha 2 (neuronal)
- CLN8: ceroid-lipofuscinosis, neuronal 8
- CNGB3: cyclic nucleotide gated channel beta 3
- COH1: vacuolar protein sorting 13B
- CPNE3: encoding protein Copine 3
- CRISPLD1: encoding protein Cysteine rich secretory protein LCCL domain containing 1
- CSGALNACT1: Chondroitin sulfate N-acetylgalactosaminyltransferase 1
- CTHRC1: encoding protein Collagen triple helix repeat containing 1
- CYP11B1: cytochrome P450, family 11, subfamily B, polypeptide 1
- CYP11B2: cytochrome P450, family 11, subfamily B, polypeptide 2
- DCSTAMP: dendrocyte expressed seven transmembrane protein
- DPYS: dihydropyrimidinase
- EBAG9: Estrogen receptor binding site associated antigen 9
- ENTPD4: encoding protein Ectonucleoside triphosphate diphosphohydrolase 4
- EPPK1: epiplakin
- ERICH5: encoding protein Glutamate rich 5
- ESCO2: establishment of sister chromatid cohesion N-acetyltransferase 2
- EXT1: exostosin glycosyltransferase 1
- EXTL3: exostosin-like glycosyltransferase 3
- EYA1: EYA transcriptional coactivator and phosphatase 1
- FABP9: fatty acid binding protein 9, testis
- FAM167A: family with sequence similarity 167, member A
- FAM203B: family with sequence similarity 203, member B
- FAM83A: family with sequence similarity 83, member A
- FAM83H: family with sequence similarity 83, member H
- FAM84B: encoding protein Family with sequence similarity 84 member b
- FBXO16: encoding protein F-box protein 16
- FDFT1: encoding protein Farnesyl-diphosphate farnesyltransferase 1
- FGFR1: fibroblast growth factor receptor 1 (fms-related tyrosine kinase 2, Pfeiffer syndrome)
- FGL1: Fibrinogen-like protein 1
- GDAP1: ganglioside-induced differentiation-associated protein 1
- GDF6: growth differentiation factor 6
- GLI4: encoding protein Gli family zinc finger 4
- GPIHBP1: GPI-anchored high density lipoprotein binding protein 1
- GRINA: encoding protein Glutamate receptor, ionotropic, N-methyl D-aspartate-associated protein 1 (glutamate binding)
- GSDMC: encoding protein Gasdermin C
- GULOP pseudogene: responsible for human inability to produce Vitamin C
- HGH1: encoding protein Hgh1 homolog
- HGSNAT: heparan-alpha-glucosaminide N-acetyltransferase
- HMBOX1: encoding protein Homeobox containing 1, also known as homeobox telomere-binding protein 1 (HOT1)
- HRSP12: encoding enzyme Ribonuclease UK114
- INTS8: integrator complex subunit 8
- INTS9: integrator complex subunit 9
- KBTBD11: encoding protein Kelch repeat and btb domain containing 11
- KCNQ3: potassium channel, voltage gated KQT-like subfamily Q, member 3.
- KIAA0196: KIAA0196
- KIF13B: encoding protein Kinesin family member 13B
- LACTB2: lactamase, beta 2
- LAPTM4B: lysosomal-associated transmembrane protein 4B
- LOC642658: encoding protein Basic helix-loop-helix transcription factor scleraxis
- LPL: lipoprotein lipase
- LSM1: U6 snRNA-associated Sm-like protein LSm1
- MAK16: MAK16 homolog
- MCPH1: microcephaly, primary autosomal recessive 1
- MIR486-1: encoding MicroRNA 486-1
- MIR548V: encoding MicroRNA 548v
- MIR5680: encoding MicroRNA 5680
- MIR6850: encoding protein MicroRNA 6850
- MRPL13: encoding protein Mitochondrial ribosomal protein L13
- MYBL1: encoding protein MYB proto-oncogene like 1
- NBN: nibrin
- NDRG1: N-myc downstream regulated gene 1
- NEF3: neurofilament 3 (150kDa medium)
- NEFL: neurofilament, light polypeptide 68kDa
- ODF1: outer dense fiber protein 1
- OTUD6B: OTU domain containing 6B
- PCMTD1: encoding protein Protein-L-isoaspartate (D-aspartate) O-methyltransferase domain containing 1
- PDP1: pyruvate dehydrogenase phosphatase catalytic subunit 1
- PKIA: cAMP-dependent protein kinase inhibitor alpha
- PLEC: plectin
- PNMA2: paraneoplastic antigen Ma2
- PREX2: phosphatidylinositol-3,4,5-trisphosphate dependent Rac exchange factor 2
- PROSC: proline synthetase co-transcribe bacterial homolog protein
- PTTG3P: encoding protein Pituitary tumor-transforming 3, pseudogene
- PURG: encoding protein Purine-rich element binding protein G
- PVT1: Pvt1 oncogene
- RECQL4: RecQ protein-like 4
- RNF5P1: ring finger protein 5 pseudogene 1
- RRS1: ribosome biogenesis regulator homolog
- RUNX1T1: runt-related transcription factor 1; translocated to, 1 (cyclin D-related)
- SFTPC: surfactant protein C
- SLC20A2: Sodium-dependent phosphate transporter 2
- SLURP1: secreted LY6/PLAUR domain containing 1
- SNAI2: snail homolog 2 (Drosophila)
- SNHG6: encoding protein Small nucleolar RNA host gene 6
- SPAG11B: sperm-associated antigen 11B
- STAU2: staufen double-stranded RNA binding protein 2
- SYBU: Syntabulin
- TG: thyroglobulin
- THAP1: THAP domain containing, apoptosis associated protein 1
- TMEM67: encoding protein Meckelin
- TNFRSF11B: tumor necrosis factor receptor superfamily, member 11b
- TONSL: encoding protein Tonsoku-like, DNA repair protein
- TPA: tissue plasminogen activator
- TRMT12: tRNA methyltransferase 12 homolog
- TRPS1: trichorhinophalangeal syndrome I
- TSPYL5 (gene): encoding protein TSPY like 5
- TTI2: encoding protein TELO2 interacting protein 2
- VCPIP1: valosin containing protein/p47 complex interacting protein 1
- VXN: encoding vexin
- VMAT1: vesicular monoamine transporter protein
- VPS13B: vacuolar protein sorting 13 homolog B (yeast)
- VPS37A: vacuolar protein sorting 37 homolog A
- WRN: Werner syndrome
- XKR9: encoding protein Xk related 9
- YTHDF3: YTH N6-methyladenosine RNA binding protein 3
- ZFP41: encoding protein ZFP41 zinc finger protein
- ZHX2: zinc fingers and homeoboxes protein 2
- ZMAT4: zinc finger matrin-type 4
- ZNF16: zinc finger protein 16
- ZNF395: encoding protein Zinc finger protein 395
- ZNF517: encoding protein Zinc finger protein 517
- ZNF696: encoding protein Zinc finger protein 696
- ZNF703: zinc finger protein 703
- ZNF706: zinc finger protein 706
- ZNF707: encoding protein Zinc finger protein 707

== Diseases and disorders ==
The following diseases and disorders are some of those related to genes on chromosome 8:

- 8p23.1 duplication syndrome
- Bipolar disorder
- Burkitt lymphoma
- Charcot–Marie–Tooth disease
- COACH syndrome
- Cleft lip and cleft palate
- Cohen syndrome
- Congenital hypothyroidism
- Fahr's syndrome
- Gollop-Wolfgang complex
- Hereditary multiple exostoses
- Lipoprotein lipase deficiency, familial
- Monosomy 8p
- Myelodysplastic syndrome
- Pfeiffer syndrome
- Primary microcephaly
- Rothmund–Thomson syndrome
- Schizophrenia, associated with 8p21-22 locus
- Waardenburg syndrome
- Werner syndrome
- Pingelapese blindness
- Langer–Giedion syndrome
- Roberts syndrome
- Hepatocellular carcinoma
- Sanfilippo syndrome

Rearrangements involving the short arm of Chromosome 8 (8p) can be highly variable in size and gene content, resulting in a wide range of phenotypes including epilepsy, autism, hypotonia, gastrointestinal dysfunction, and congenital heart defects. Project 8p Foundation, a global nonprofit patient advocacy organization, supports individuals affected by chromosome 8p disorders, through community support and connection, a longitudinal natural history study, biorepository, open-access data platform, and the development of precision medicine tools aimed at improving clinical care and accelerating discovery. There is also a multidisciplinary clinic for 8p rearrangements led by Project 8p available to affected families.

== Cytogenetic band ==
G-banding ideograms of human chromosome 8

G-banding ideogram of human chromosome 8 in resolution 850 bphs. Band length in this diagram is proportional to base-pair length. This type of ideogram is generally used in genome browsers (e.g. Ensembl, UCSC Genome Browser).

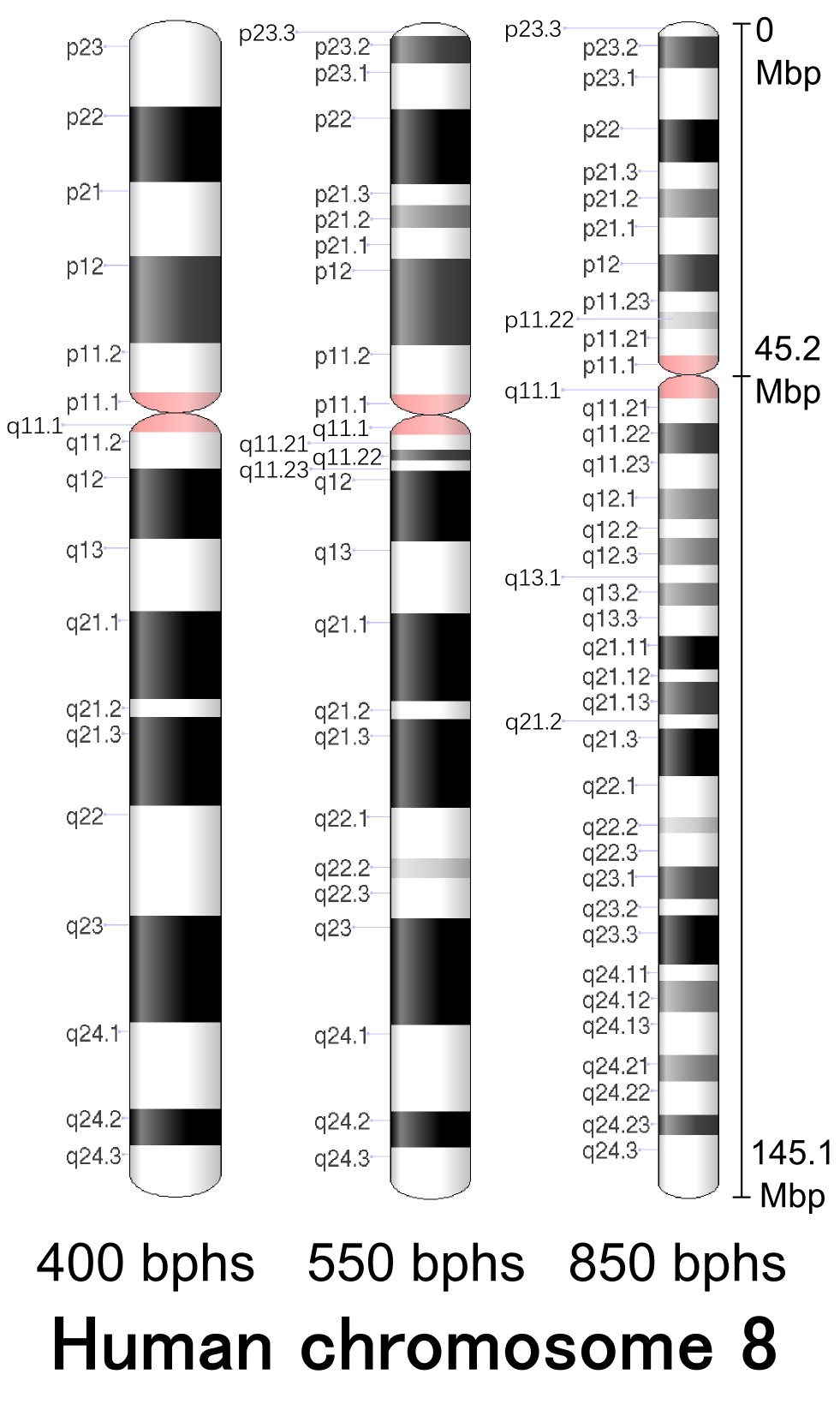
G-banding patterns of human chromosome 8 in three different resolutions (400, 550 and 850). Band length in this diagram is based on the ideograms from ISCN (2013). This type of ideogram represents actual relative band length observed under a microscope at the different moments during the mitotic process.

G-bands of human chromosome 8 in resolution 850 bphs
Chr.	Arm	Band	ISCN start	ISCN stop	Basepair start	Basepair stop	Stain	Density
8	p	23.3	0	115	1	2,300,000	gneg	
8	p	23.2	115	331	2,300,001	6,300,000	gpos	75
8	p	23.1	331	690	6,300,001	12,800,000	gneg	
8	p	22	690	992	12,800,001	19,200,000	gpos	100
8	p	21.3	992	1179	19,200,001	23,500,000	gneg	
8	p	21.2	1179	1380	23,500,001	27,500,000	gpos	50
8	p	21.1	1380	1639	27,500,001	29,000,000	gneg	
8	p	12	1639	1897	29,000,001	36,700,000	gpos	75
8	p	11.23	1897	2041	36,700,001	38,500,000	gneg	
8	p	11.22	2041	2156	38,500,001	39,900,000	gpos	25
8	p	11.21	2156	2343	39,900,001	43,200,000	gneg	
8	p	11.1	2343	2472	43,200,001	45,200,000	acen	
8	q	11.1	2472	2645	45,200,001	47,200,000	acen	
8	q	11.21	2645	2817	47,200,001	51,300,000	gneg	
8	q	11.22	2817	3033	51,300,001	51,700,000	gpos	75
8	q	11.23	3033	3277	51,700,001	54,600,000	gneg	
8	q	12.1	3277	3493	54,600,001	60,600,000	gpos	50
8	q	12.2	3493	3622	60,600,001	61,300,000	gneg	
8	q	12.3	3622	3809	61,300,001	65,100,000	gpos	50
8	q	13.1	3809	3938	65,100,001	67,100,000	gneg	
8	q	13.2	3938	4096	67,100,001	69,600,000	gpos	50
8	q	13.3	4096	4312	69,600,001	72,000,000	gneg	
8	q	21.11	4312	4545	72,000,001	74,600,000	gpos	100
8	q	21.12	4545	4628	74,600,001	74,700,000	gneg	
8	q	21.13	4628	4858	74,700,001	83,500,000	gpos	75
8	q	21.2	4858	4959	83,500,001	85,900,000	gneg	
8	q	21.3	4959	5289	85,900,001	92,300,000	gpos	100
8	q	22.1	5289	5577	92,300,001	97,900,000	gneg	
8	q	22.2	5577	5692	97,900,001	100,500,000	gpos	25
8	q	22.3	5692	5922	100,500,001	105,100,000	gneg	
8	q	23.1	5922	6152	105,100,001	109,500,000	gpos	75
8	q	23.2	6152	6267	109,500,001	111,100,000	gneg	
8	q	23.3	6267	6611	111,100,001	116,700,000	gpos	100
8	q	24.11	6611	6726	116,700,001	118,300,000	gneg	
8	q	24.12	6726	6942	118,300,001	121,500,000	gpos	50
8	q	24.13	6942	7244	121,500,001	126,300,000	gneg	
8	q	24.21	7244	7431	126,300,001	130,400,000	gpos	50
8	q	24.22	7431	7661	130,400,001	135,400,000	gneg	
8	q	24.23	7661	7804	135,400,001	138,900,000	gpos	75
8	q	24.3	7804	8250	138,900,001	145,138,636	gneg	
