= GRINA =

Protein-coding gene in the species Homo sapiens

Identifiers
- Aliases: GRINA, HNRGW, LFG1, NMDARA1, TMBIM3, glutamate ionotropic receptor NMDA type subunit associated protein 1
- External IDs: OMIM: 138251; MGI: 1913418; HomoloGene: 41517; GeneCards: GRINA; OMA:GRINA - orthologs

Gene location (Human)
Chr.	Chromosome 8 (human)
Band	8q24.3	Start	143,990,056 bp
Band	8q24.3	End	143,993,415 bp

Gene location (Mouse)
Chr.	Chromosome 15 (mouse)
Band	15 D3|15	Start	76,130,964 bp
Band	15 D3|15	End	76,134,104 bp
RNA expression pattern
Bgee	Human / Mouse (ortholog); Top expressed in: left testis; right testis; right hemisphere of cerebellum; stromal cell of endometrium; right frontal lobe; right lobe of liver; right adrenal cortex; left adrenal gland; right lobe of thyroid gland; left lobe of thyroid gland / Top expressed in: granulocyte; cerebellar cortex; primary visual cortex; superior frontal gyrus; neural layer of retina; striatum of neuraxis; dentate gyrus of hippocampal formation granule cell; hippocampus proper; bone marrow; white adipose tissue; More reference expression data
BioGPS	n/a
Gene ontology
Molecular function	transmembrane transporter binding
Cellular component	integral component of membrane; Golgi apparatus; endoplasmic reticulum; membrane
Biological process	negative regulation of endoplasmic reticulum stress-induced intrinsic apoptotic signaling pathway; endoplasmic reticulum calcium ion homeostasis
Sources:Amigo / QuickGO
Orthologs
Species	Human	Mouse
Entrez	2907	66168
Ensembl	ENSG00000178719	ENSMUSG00000022564
UniProt	Q7Z429	Q9ESF4
RefSeq (mRNA)	NM_000837; NM_001009184	NM_023168
RefSeq (protein)	NP_000828; NP_001009184	NP_075657
Location (UCSC)	Chr 8: 143.99 – 143.99 Mb	Chr 15: 76.13 – 76.13 Mb
PubMed search
- Wikidata
View/Edit Human	View/Edit Mouse

Glutamate receptor, ionotropic, N-methyl D-aspartate-associated protein 1 (glutamate binding) is a protein in humans that is encoded by the GRINA gene.
