= MAK16 =

Protein-coding gene in the species Homo sapiens

Identifiers
- Aliases: MAK16, MAK16L, RBM13, MAK16 homolog
- External IDs: MGI: 1915170; GeneCards: MAK16

Gene location (Human)
Chr.	Chromosome 8 (human)
Band	8p12	Start	33,485,182 bp
Band	8p12	End	33,501,262 bp

Gene location (Mouse)
Chr.	Chromosome 8 (mouse)
Band	8|8 A3	Start	31,649,491 bp
Band	8|8 A3	End	31,658,792 bp
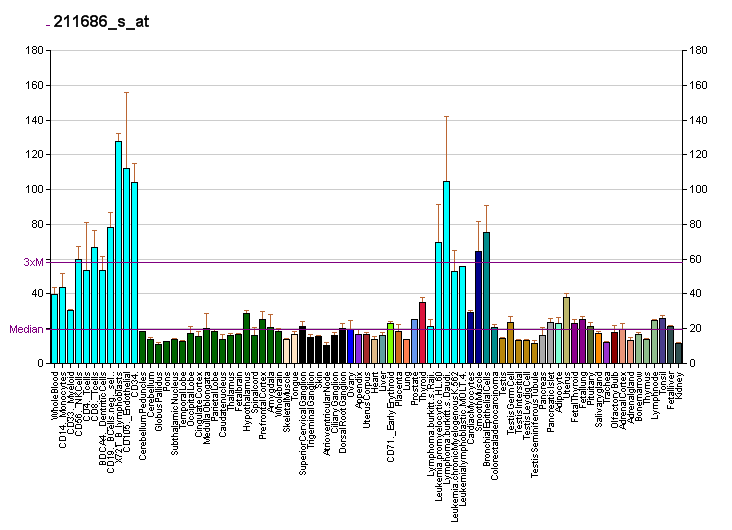
RNA expression pattern
Bgee	Human / Mouse (ortholog); Top expressed in: Achilles tendon; secondary oocyte; tibialis anterior muscle; deltoid muscle; buccal mucosa cell; gonad; testicle; glutes; parietal pleura; biceps brachii / Top expressed in: tail of embryo; primitive streak; epiblast; genital tubercle; embryo; embryo; endothelial cell of lymphatic vessel; Paneth cell; hair follicle; somite; More reference expression data
BioGPS	More reference expression data
Gene ontology
Molecular function	RNA binding
Cellular component	intracellular membrane-bounded organelle; nucleus; preribosome, large subunit precursor; nucleolus
Biological process	maturation of 5.8S rRNA; maturation of LSU-rRNA
Sources:Amigo / QuickGO
Orthologs
Databases	NCBI: entry; OMA: entry
Species	Human	Mouse
Entrez	84549	67920
Ensembl	ENSG00000198042	ENSMUSG00000031578
UniProt	Q9BXY0	Q8BGS0
RefSeq (mRNA)	NM_032509	NM_026453
RefSeq (protein)	NP_115898	NP_080729
Location (UCSC)	Chr 8: 33.49 – 33.5 Mb	Chr 8: 31.65 – 31.66 Mb
PubMed search
- Wikidata
View/Edit Human	View/Edit Mouse

Protein MAK16 homolog is a protein that in humans is encoded by the MAK16 gene.
