= FABP9 =

Protein-coding gene in the species Homo sapiens

Identifiers
- Aliases: FABP9, PERF, PERF15, T-FABP, TLBP, fatty acid binding protein 9
- External IDs: MGI: 1194881; GeneCards: FABP9
Available structures
PDB	Ortholog search: PDBe RCSB
PDB	List of PDB id codes 4A60

Gene location (Human)
Chr.	Chromosome 8 (human)
Band	8q21.13	Start	81,458,253 bp
Band	8q21.13	End	81,461,579 bp

Gene location (Mouse)
Chr.	Chromosome 3 (mouse)
Band	3|3 A1	Start	10,258,681 bp
Band	3|3 A1	End	10,262,343 bp
RNA expression pattern
Bgee	Human / Mouse (ortholog); Top expressed in: subcutaneous adipose tissue; gonad; lactiferous gland; skin of abdomen; skin of leg; left ventricle; triceps surae; gastrocnemius muscle; right testis; left testis / Top expressed in: seminiferous tubule; spermatid; spermatocyte; morula; blastocyst; zygote; Ileal epithelium; thymus; Gonadal ridge; neural layer of retina; More reference expression data
BioGPS	n/a
Gene ontology
Molecular function	lipid binding
Cellular component	cytoplasm; cytosol; acrosomal vesicle
Biological process	acrosome assembly; triglyceride catabolic process
Sources:Amigo / QuickGO
Orthologs
Databases	NCBI: entry; OMA: entry
Species	Human	Mouse
Entrez	646480	21884
Ensembl	ENSG00000205186	ENSMUSG00000027528
UniProt	Q0Z7S8	O08716
RefSeq (mRNA)	NM_001080526	NM_011598
RefSeq (protein)	NP_001073995	NP_035728
Location (UCSC)	Chr 8: 81.46 – 81.46 Mb	Chr 3: 10.26 – 10.26 Mb
PubMed search
- Wikidata
View/Edit Human	View/Edit Mouse

Fatty acid binding protein 9, testis is a protein that in humans is encoded by the FABP9 gene.
