= Dendrocyte expressed seven transmembrane protein =

Protein-coding gene in the species Homo sapiens

DCSTAMP

Identifiers
- Aliases: DCSTAMP, FIND, TM7SF4, hDC-STAMP, dendrocyte expressed seven transmembrane protein
- External IDs: OMIM: 605933; MGI: 1923016; GeneCards: DCSTAMP

Gene location (Human)
Chr.	Chromosome 8 (human)
Band	8q22.3	Start	104,339,087 bp
Band	8q22.3	End	104,356,689 bp

Gene location (Mouse)
Chr.	Chromosome 15 (mouse)
Band	15|15 B3.1	Start	39,609,326 bp
Band	15|15 B3.1	End	39,624,334 bp
RNA expression pattern
Bgee	Human / Mouse (ortholog); Top expressed in: stromal cell of endometrium; amygdala; right lung; upper lobe of left lung; islet of Langerhans; tibia; right uterine tube; Brodmann area 9; amniotic fluid; right lobe of liver / Top expressed in: body of femur; blastocyst; cochlea; submandibular gland; adrenal gland; pituitary gland; lens; lip; islet of Langerhans; respiratory system; More reference expression data
BioGPS	n/a
Gene ontology
Molecular function	protein binding
Cellular component	integral component of membrane; endosome; endoplasmic reticulum membrane; membrane; plasma membrane; cell surface; integral component of endoplasmic reticulum membrane; endoplasmic reticulum; endosome membrane; endoplasmic reticulum-Golgi intermediate compartment membrane
Biological process	cellular response to interleukin-4; cell differentiation; immune system process; osteoclast differentiation; cellular response to tumor necrosis factor; membrane fusion; myeloid dendritic cell differentiation; positive regulation of bone resorption; positive regulation of macrophage fusion; cellular response to macrophage colony-stimulating factor stimulus; osteoclast fusion; negative regulation of cell growth; positive regulation of monocyte differentiation
Sources:Amigo / QuickGO
Orthologs
Databases	NCBI: entry; OMA: entry
Species	Human	Mouse
Entrez	81501	75766
Ensembl	ENSG00000164935	ENSMUSG00000022303
UniProt	Q9H295	Q7TNJ0
RefSeq (mRNA)	NM_001257317; NM_030788	NM_001289506; NM_001289508; NM_001289512; NM_001289513; NM_029422
RefSeq (protein)	NP_001244246; NP_110415	NP_001276435; NP_001276437; NP_001276441; NP_001276442; NP_083698
Location (UCSC)	Chr 8: 104.34 – 104.36 Mb	Chr 15: 39.61 – 39.62 Mb
PubMed search
- Wikidata
View/Edit Human	View/Edit Mouse

Dendrocyte expressed seven transmembrane protein is a protein that in humans is encoded by the DCSTAMP gene.

== Function ==
This gene encodes a seven-pass transmembrane protein that is primarily expressed in dendritic cells. The encoded protein is involved in a range of immunological functions carried out by dendritic cells. This protein plays a role in osteoclastogenesis and myeloid differentiation. Alternate splicing results in multiple transcript variants. [provided by RefSeq, Mar 2012].
