= TCIM =

Protein-coding gene in the species Homo sapiens

Identifiers
- Aliases: TCIM, TC-1, TC1, C8orf4, chromosome 8 open reading frame 4, transcriptional and immune response regulator
- External IDs: OMIM: 607702; MGI: 1916318; HomoloGene: 10590; GeneCards: TCIM; OMA:TCIM - orthologs

Gene location (Human)
Chr.	Chromosome 8 (human)
Band	8p11.21	Start	40,153,482 bp
Band	8p11.21	End	40,155,310 bp

Gene location (Mouse)
Chr.	Chromosome 8 (mouse)
Band	8|8 A2	Start	24,927,196 bp
Band	8|8 A2	End	24,929,000 bp
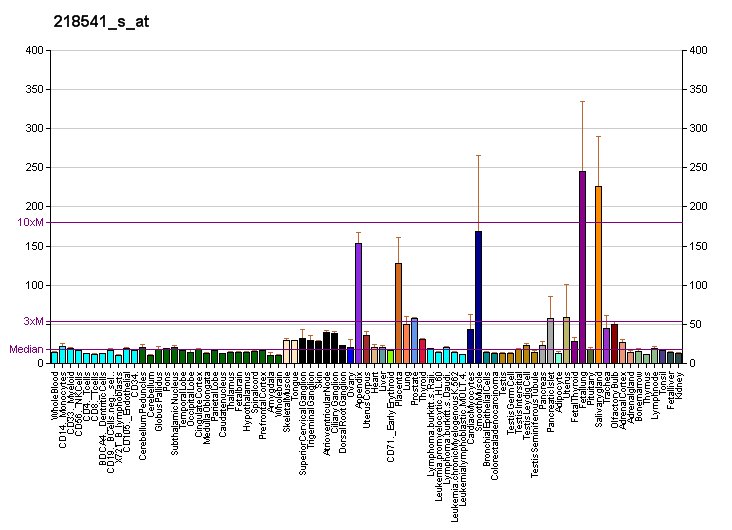
RNA expression pattern
Bgee	Human / Mouse (ortholog); Top expressed in: parotid gland; gallbladder; right lung; vena cava; mucosa of urinary bladder; seminal vesicula; upper lobe of left lung; pericardium; visceral pleura; rectum / Top expressed in: parotid gland; lacrimal gland; left lung lobe; interventricular septum; seminal vesicula; molar; olfactory epithelium; epithelium of small intestine; intestinal villus; brown adipose tissue; More reference expression data
BioGPS	More reference expression data
Gene ontology
Molecular function	protein binding; Notch binding
Cellular component	cytoplasm; nuclear speck; nucleolus; nucleus; nucleoplasm; cytosol; plasma membrane; intracellular anatomical structure
Biological process	regulation of cell cycle G1/S phase transition; endothelial cell activation involved in immune response; cellular response to heat; regulation of DNA-templated transcription in response to stress; regulation of hemopoiesis; negative regulation of Notch signaling pathway; apoptotic process; positive regulation of protein kinase A signaling; negative regulation of apoptotic process; positive regulation of protein kinase C activity; positive regulation of NIK/NF-kappaB signaling
Sources:Amigo / QuickGO
Orthologs
Species	Human	Mouse
Entrez	56892	69068
Ensembl	ENSG00000176907	ENSMUSG00000056313
UniProt	Q9NR00	Q9D915
RefSeq (mRNA)	NM_020130	NM_026931
RefSeq (protein)	NP_064515	NP_081207
Location (UCSC)	Chr 8: 40.15 – 40.16 Mb	Chr 8: 24.93 – 24.93 Mb
PubMed search
- Wikidata
View/Edit Human	View/Edit Mouse

TCIM is a protein that in humans is encoded by the TCIM gene.

== Function ==
This gene encodes a small, monomeric, predominantly unstructured protein (106 amino acids, 12.3 kDa, isoelectric point 9.39). It is a positive regulator of the Wnt / beta-catenin signaling pathway. This protein interacts with a repressor of beta-catenin mediated transcription at nuclear speckles. It is thought to competitively block interactions of the repressor with beta-catenin, resulting in up-regulation of beta-catenin target genes.
