= INTS8 =

Protein-coding gene in the species Homo sapiens

Identifiers
- Aliases: INTS8, C8orf52, INT8, integrator complex subunit 8, NEDCHS
- External IDs: OMIM: 611351; MGI: 1919906; GeneCards: INTS8

Gene location (Human)
Chr.	Chromosome 8 (human)
Band	8q22.1	Start	94,813,311 bp
Band	8q22.1	End	94,881,746 bp

Gene location (Mouse)
Chr.	Chromosome 4 (mouse)
Band	4|4 A1	Start	11,199,158 bp
Band	4|4 A1	End	11,254,258 bp
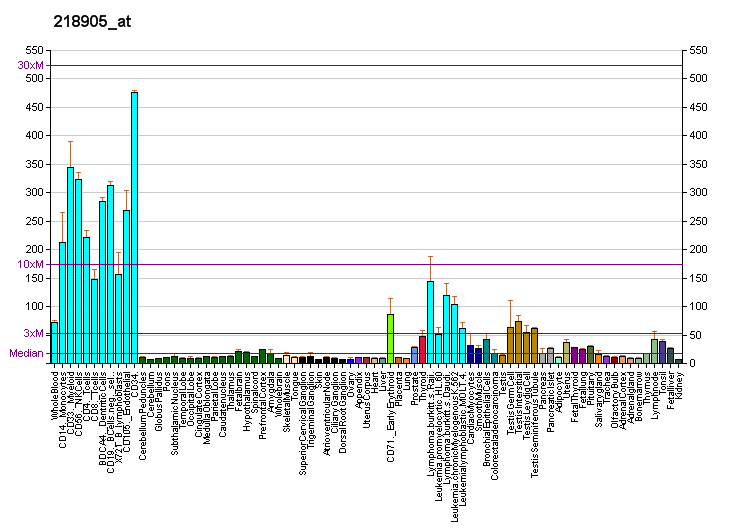
RNA expression pattern
Bgee	Human / Mouse (ortholog); Top expressed in: secondary oocyte; gonad; Achilles tendon; ventricular zone; epithelium of colon; body of pancreas; canal of the cervix; ganglionic eminence; body of uterus; right ovary / Top expressed in: tail of embryo; genital tubercle; ventricular zone; otic placode; somite; saccule; medial ganglionic eminence; epiblast; superior cervical ganglion; hand; More reference expression data
BioGPS	More reference expression data
Gene ontology
Molecular function	protein binding
Cellular component	integrator complex; nucleus; nucleoplasm
Biological process	snRNA processing; snRNA transcription by RNA polymerase II; snRNA 3'-end processing
Sources:Amigo / QuickGO
Orthologs
Databases	NCBI: entry; OMA: entry
Species	Human	Mouse
Entrez	55656	72656
Ensembl	ENSG00000164941	ENSMUSG00000040738
UniProt	Q75QN2	Q80V86
RefSeq (mRNA)	NM_017864	NM_001159595; NM_178112
RefSeq (protein)	NP_060334	NP_001153067; NP_835213
Location (UCSC)	Chr 8: 94.81 – 94.88 Mb	Chr 4: 11.2 – 11.25 Mb
PubMed search
- Wikidata
View/Edit Human	View/Edit Mouse

Integrator complex subunit 8 is a protein that in humans is encoded by the INTS8 gene.
