= EXTL3 =

Protein-coding gene in the species Homo sapiens

Identifiers
- Aliases: EXTL3, BOTV, EXTL1L, EXTR1, REGR, RPR, exostosin like glycosyltransferase 3, ISDNA
- External IDs: OMIM: 605744; MGI: 1860765; GeneCards: EXTL3
Enzyme activity
EC #	BRENDA	ExPASy	KEGG	MetaCyc
2.4.1.223	↗	↗	↗	↗

Gene location (Human)
Chr.	Chromosome 8 (human)
Band	8p21.1	Start	28,600,469 bp
Band	8p21.1	End	28,756,561 bp

Gene location (Mouse)
Chr.	Chromosome 14 (mouse)
Band	14|14 D1	Start	65,289,509 bp
Band	14|14 D1	End	65,387,304 bp
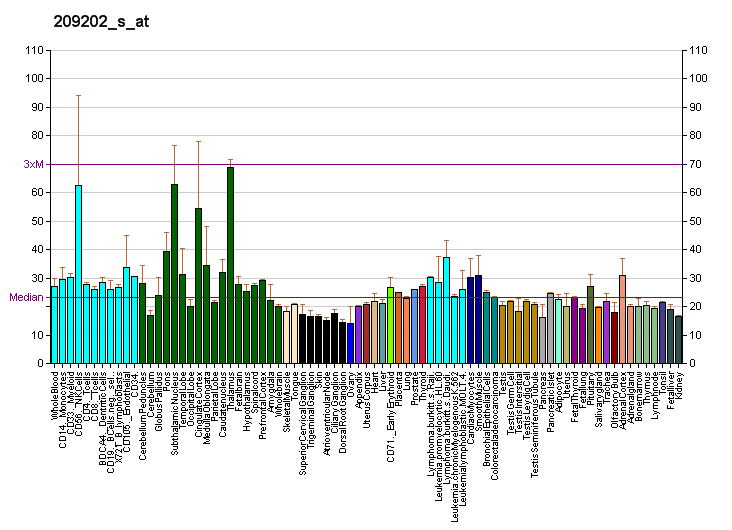

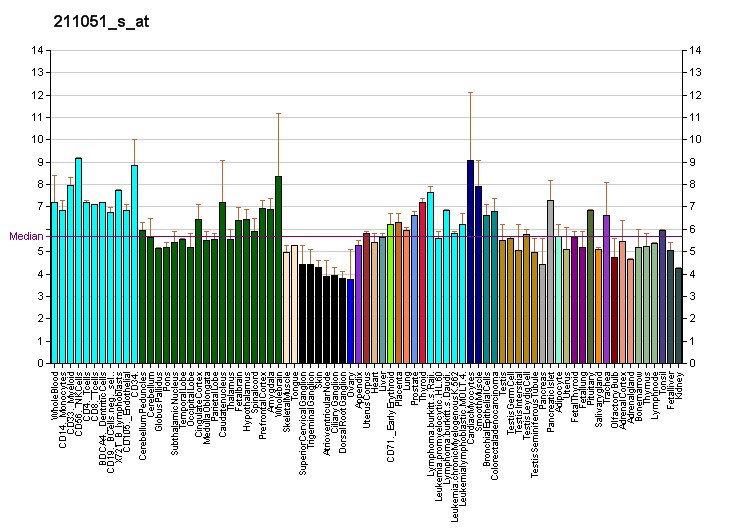
RNA expression pattern
Bgee	Human / Mouse (ortholog); Top expressed in: stromal cell of endometrium; ventricular zone; ganglionic eminence; islet of Langerhans; prefrontal cortex; gastric mucosa; frontal pole; apex of heart; Brodmann area 10; right auricle of heart / Top expressed in: aortic valve; perirhinal cortex; ascending aorta; nucleus of stria terminalis; internal carotid artery; external carotid artery; renal corpuscle; piriform cortex; entorhinal cortex; atrium; More reference expression data
BioGPS	More reference expression data
Gene ontology
Molecular function	transferase activity; glucuronyl-galactosyl-proteoglycan 4-alpha-N-acetylglucosaminyltransferase activity; metal ion binding; glycosyltransferase activity
Cellular component	integral component of membrane; membrane; endoplasmic reticulum; endoplasmic reticulum membrane; Golgi apparatus
Biological process	positive regulation of cell growth; IRE1-mediated unfolded protein response; heparan sulfate proteoglycan biosynthetic process; protein glycosylation
Sources:Amigo / QuickGO
Orthologs
Databases	NCBI: entry; OMA: entry
Species	Human	Mouse
Entrez	2137	54616
Ensembl	ENSG00000012232	ENSMUSG00000021978
UniProt	O43909	Q9WVL6; Q6P1H4
RefSeq (mRNA)	NM_001440	NM_018788; NM_001360385
RefSeq (protein)	NP_001431	NP_061258; NP_001347314; NP_001391867; NP_001391868; NP_001391869 NP_001391870; NP_001391871; NP_001391872; NP_001391873; NP_001391874; NP_001391875
Location (UCSC)	Chr 8: 28.6 – 28.76 Mb	Chr 14: 65.29 – 65.39 Mb
PubMed search
- Wikidata
View/Edit Human	View/Edit Mouse

Exostosin-like 3 is a protein that in humans is encoded by the EXTL3 gene.
