= SYBU =

Protein-coding gene in the species Homo sapiens

Identifiers
- Aliases: SYBU, GOLSYN, OCSYN, SNPHL, syntabulin
- External IDs: OMIM: 611568; MGI: 2442392; HomoloGene: 9838; GeneCards: SYBU; OMA:SYBU - orthologs

Gene location (Human)
Chr.	Chromosome 8 (human)
Band	8q23.2	Start	109,573,978 bp
Band	8q23.2	End	109,691,791 bp

Gene location (Mouse)
Chr.	Chromosome 15 (mouse)
Band	15|15 B3.2	Start	44,535,252 bp
Band	15|15 B3.2	End	44,651,459 bp
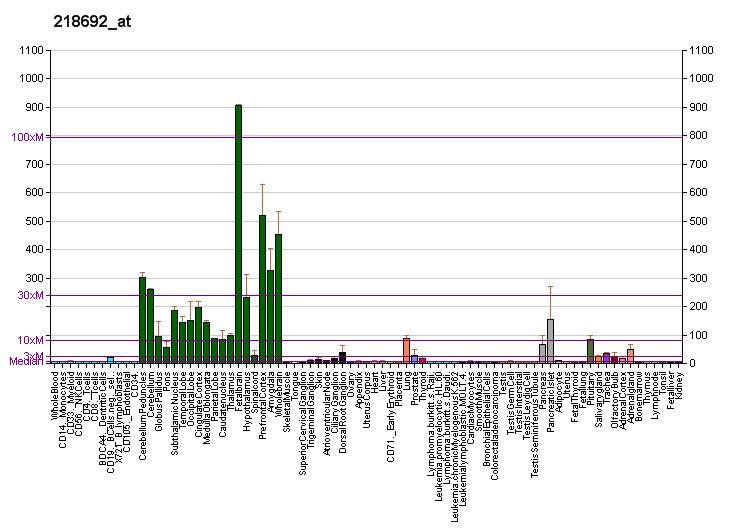
RNA expression pattern
Bgee	Human / Mouse (ortholog); Top expressed in: cerebellar vermis; middle temporal gyrus; superior frontal gyrus; postcentral gyrus; Brodmann area 23; body of pancreas; entorhinal cortex; cerebellar hemisphere; orbitofrontal cortex; pons / Top expressed in: lobe of cerebellum; cerebellar vermis; ventromedial nucleus; piriform cortex; dentate gyrus; habenula; paraventricular nucleus of hypothalamus; mammillary body; anterior amygdaloid area; dentate gyrus of hippocampal formation granule cell; More reference expression data
BioGPS	More reference expression data
Gene ontology
Molecular function	microtubule binding; protein binding; syntaxin-1 binding; kinesin binding
Cellular component	cytoplasm; cytoplasmic vesicle; integral component of membrane; Golgi membrane; Golgi apparatus; dense body; intracellular membrane-bounded organelle; cytoskeleton; membrane; microtubule; vesicle; axon cytoplasm
Biological process	regulation of insulin secretion involved in cellular response to glucose stimulus; axonal transport of mitochondrion; positive regulation of insulin secretion involved in cellular response to glucose stimulus; regulation of synaptic activity; synapse maturation; anterograde neuronal dense core vesicle transport
Sources:Amigo / QuickGO
Orthologs
Species	Human	Mouse
Entrez	55638	319613
Ensembl	ENSG00000147642	ENSMUSG00000022340
UniProt	Q9NX95	Q8BHS8
RefSeq (mRNA)	NM_001099743; NM_001099744; NM_001099745; NM_001099746; NM_001099747 NM_001099748; NM_001099749; NM_001099750; NM_001099751; NM_001099752; NM_001099753; NM_001099754; NM_001099755; NM_001099756; NM_017786; NM_001330596; NM_001363032	NM_001032727; NM_001285840; NM_001285841; NM_001285842; NM_001285843 NM_001285844; NM_176998; NM_178765; NM_001358582; NM_001358583; NM_001358584
RefSeq (protein)	NP_001093213; NP_001093214; NP_001093215; NP_001093216; NP_001093217 NP_001093218; NP_001093219; NP_001093220; NP_001093221; NP_001093222; NP_001093223; NP_001093224; NP_001093225; NP_001093226; NP_001317525; NP_060256; NP_001349961	NP_001027899; NP_001272769; NP_001272770; NP_001272771; NP_001272772 NP_001272773; NP_795972; NP_848880; NP_001345511; NP_001345512; NP_001345513
Location (UCSC)	Chr 8: 109.57 – 109.69 Mb	Chr 15: 44.54 – 44.65 Mb
PubMed search
- Wikidata
View/Edit Human	View/Edit Mouse

Syntabulin, also known as SYBU, is a human gene.
