= MicroRNA 6850 =

Non-coding RNA in the species Homo sapiens

MIR6850

Identifiers
- Aliases: MIR6850, hsa-mir-6850, microRNA 6850
- External IDs: GeneCards: MIR6850; OMA:MIR6850 - orthologs

Gene location (Human)
Chr.	Chromosome 8 (human)
Band	8q24.3	Start	144,791,931 bp
Band	8q24.3	End	144,791,991 bp
RNA expression pattern
Bgee	Human / Mouse (ortholog); Top expressed in: liver; duodenum; muscle of leg; monocyte; gastrocnemius muscle; blood; left ventricle; apex of heart; right auricle of heart; tibial arteries / n/a; More reference expression data
BioGPS	n/a
Orthologs
Species	Human	Mouse
Entrez	102465978	n/a
Ensembl	ENSG00000283764	n/a
UniProt	n a	n/a
RefSeq (mRNA)	n/a	n/a
RefSeq (protein)	n/a	n/a
Location (UCSC)	Chr 8: 144.79 – 144.79 Mb	n/a
PubMed search		n/a
- Wikidata
View/Edit Human

MicroRNA 6850 is a protein that in humans is encoded by the MIR6850 gene.

== Function ==
microRNAs (miRNAs) are short (20-24 nt) non-coding RNAs that are involved in post-transcriptional regulation of gene expression in multicellular organisms by affecting both the stability and translation of mRNAs. miRNAs are transcribed by RNA polymerase II as part of capped and polyadenylated primary transcripts (pri-miRNAs) that can be either protein-coding or non-coding. The primary transcript is cleaved by the Drosha ribonuclease III enzyme to produce an approximately 70-nt stem-loop precursor miRNA (pre-miRNA), which is further cleaved by the cytoplasmic Dicer ribonuclease to generate the mature miRNA and antisense miRNA star (miRNA*) products. The mature miRNA is incorporated into a RNA-induced silencing complex (RISC), which recognizes target mRNAs through imperfect base pairing with the miRNA and most commonly results in translational inhibition or destabilization of the target mRNA. The RefSeq represents the predicted microRNA stem-loop.
