= Collagen triple helix repeat containing 1 =

Protein-coding gene in the species Homo sapiens

CTHRC1

Identifiers
- Aliases: CTHRC1, collagen triple helix repeat containing 1
- External IDs: OMIM: 610635; MGI: 1915838; HomoloGene: 16320; GeneCards: CTHRC1; OMA:CTHRC1 - orthologs

Gene location (Human)
Chr.	Chromosome 8 (human)
Band	8q22.3	Start	103,371,538 bp
Band	8q22.3	End	103,382,989 bp

Gene location (Mouse)
Chr.	Chromosome 15 (mouse)
Band	15|15 B3.1	Start	38,940,327 bp
Band	15|15 B3.1	End	38,950,516 bp
RNA expression pattern
Bgee	Human / Mouse (ortholog); Top expressed in: tibia; skin of hip; visceral pleura; cartilage tissue; skin of arm; gallbladder; parietal pleura; skin of thigh; placenta; stromal cell of endometrium / Top expressed in: cartilage of bone; long bone; cranium; neurocranium; bones of free part of lower limb; facial skeleton; bone of hand; chondrocranium; third toe; phalanx of third toe; More reference expression data
BioGPS	n/a
Gene ontology
Molecular function	Wnt-protein binding; frizzled binding; extracellular matrix structural constituent
Cellular component	cytoplasm; collagen; extracellular space; extracellular region; extracellular matrix; collagen-containing extracellular matrix
Biological process	Wnt signaling pathway, planar cell polarity pathway; positive regulation of osteoblast proliferation; positive regulation of protein binding; positive regulation of osteoblast differentiation; cell migration; inner ear receptor cell stereocilium organization; negative regulation of canonical Wnt signaling pathway; cochlea morphogenesis; establishment of planar polarity involved in neural tube closure; ossification involved in bone remodeling
Sources:Amigo / QuickGO
Orthologs
Species	Human	Mouse
Entrez	115908	68588
Ensembl	ENSG00000164932	ENSMUSG00000054196
UniProt	Q96CG8	Q9D1D6
RefSeq (mRNA)	NM_001256099; NM_138455	NM_026778; NM_001364812; NM_001364813
RefSeq (protein)	NP_001243028; NP_612464	NP_081054; NP_001351741; NP_001351742
Location (UCSC)	Chr 8: 103.37 – 103.38 Mb	Chr 15: 38.94 – 38.95 Mb
PubMed search
- Wikidata
View/Edit Human	View/Edit Mouse

Collagen triple helix repeat containing 1 is a protein that in humans is encoded by the CTHRC1 gene.

== Function ==
This locus encodes a protein that may play a role in the cellular response to arterial injury through involvement in vascular remodeling. Mutations at this locus have been associated with Barrett's esophagus and esophageal adenocarcinoma. Alternatively, spliced transcript variants have been described.
