= TTI2 =

Protein-coding gene in the species Homo sapiens

Identifiers
- Aliases: TTI2, C8orf41, MRT39, TELO2 interacting protein 2
- External IDs: OMIM: 614426; MGI: 2384576; GeneCards: TTI2

Gene location (Human)
Chr.	Chromosome 8 (human)
Band	8p12	Start	33,473,386 bp
Band	8p12	End	33,513,185 bp

Gene location (Mouse)
Chr.	Chromosome 8 (mouse)
Band	8|8 A3	Start	31,640,343 bp
Band	8|8 A3	End	31,654,730 bp
RNA expression pattern
Bgee	Human / Mouse (ortholog); Top expressed in: testicle; ventricular zone; gonad; islet of Langerhans; ganglionic eminence; mucosa of transverse colon; stromal cell of endometrium; gastrocnemius muscle; right testis; left testis / Top expressed in: otic vesicle; otic placode; primitive streak; saccule; submandibular gland; lumbar subsegment of spinal cord; tail of embryo; gastrula; granulocyte; ventricular zone; More reference expression data
BioGPS	n/a
Orthologs
Databases	NCBI: entry; OMA: entry
Species	Human	Mouse
Entrez	80185	234138
Ensembl	ENSG00000129696	ENSMUSG00000031577
UniProt	Q6NXR4	Q8BGV4
RefSeq (mRNA)	NM_001102401; NM_001265581; NM_025115; NM_001330505	NM_001112729; NM_001199988; NM_144927
RefSeq (protein)	NP_001095871; NP_001252510; NP_001317434; NP_079391	NP_001186917; NP_659176
Location (UCSC)	Chr 8: 33.47 – 33.51 Mb	Chr 8: 31.64 – 31.65 Mb
PubMed search
- Wikidata
View/Edit Human	View/Edit Mouse

TELO2 interacting protein 2 is a protein that is encoded by the TTI2 gene in humans.

== Function ==
This gene encodes a regulator of the DNA damage response. The protein is a component of the Triple T complex (TTT) which also includes telomere length regulation protein and TELO2 interacting protein 1.

The TTT complex is involved in cellular resistance to DNA damage stresses and may act as a regulator of phosphoinositide-3-kinase-related protein kinase (PIKK) abundance.
