= TSPYL5 =

Protein-coding gene in humans

Identifiers
- Aliases: TSPYL5, TSPY like 5
- External IDs: OMIM: 614721; MGI: 2442458; GeneCards: TSPYL5

Gene location (Human)
Chr.	Chromosome 8 (human)
Band	8q22.1	Start	97,273,488 bp
Band	8q22.1	End	97,277,928 bp

Gene location (Mouse)
Chr.	Chromosome 15 (mouse)
Band	15|15 B3.1	Start	33,684,021 bp
Band	15|15 B3.1	End	33,688,030 bp
RNA expression pattern
Bgee	Human / Mouse (ortholog); Top expressed in: testicle; seminal vesicula; spinal ganglia; corpus epididymis; tail of epididymis; superior vestibular nucleus; lateral nuclear group of thalamus; lactiferous duct; trigeminal ganglion; cardiac muscle tissue of right atrium / Top expressed in: spermatocyte; amygdala; visual cortex; hippocampus proper; prefrontal cortex; piriform cortex; dorsal striatum; nucleus of stria terminalis; primary visual cortex; nucleus accumbens; More reference expression data
BioGPS	n/a
Gene ontology
Molecular function	protein binding
Cellular component	nucleus
Biological process	regulation of growth; nucleosome assembly; positive regulation of protein kinase B signaling; positive regulation of protein ubiquitination; cellular response to gamma radiation; positive regulation of cell population proliferation
Sources:Amigo / QuickGO
Orthologs
Databases	NCBI: entry; OMA: entry
Species	Human	Mouse
Entrez	85453	239364
Ensembl	ENSG00000180543	ENSMUSG00000038984
UniProt	Q86VY4	Q69ZB3
RefSeq (mRNA)	NM_033512	NM_001085421
RefSeq (protein)	NP_277047	NP_001078890
Location (UCSC)	Chr 8: 97.27 – 97.28 Mb	Chr 15: 33.68 – 33.69 Mb
PubMed search
- Wikidata
View/Edit Human	View/Edit Mouse

TSPY like 5 is a protein that in humans is encoded by the TSPYL5 gene.
