= FAM167A =

Protein-coding gene in the species Homo sapiens

Identifiers
- Aliases: FAM167A, C8orf13, D8S265, family with sequence similarity 167 member A, DIORA-1
- External IDs: OMIM: 610085; MGI: 3606565; HomoloGene: 14243; GeneCards: FAM167A; OMA:FAM167A - orthologs

Gene location (Human)
Chr.	Chromosome 8 (human)
Band	8p23.1	Start	11,421,476 bp
Band	8p23.1	End	11,475,908 bp

Gene location (Mouse)
Chr.	Chromosome 14 (mouse)
Band	14|14 D1	Start	63,673,843 bp
Band	14|14 D1	End	63,702,947 bp
RNA expression pattern
Bgee	Human / Mouse (ortholog); Top expressed in: stromal cell of endometrium; islet of Langerhans; secondary oocyte; skin of arm; thyroid gland; left lobe of thyroid gland; right lobe of thyroid gland; amygdala; gonad; cingulate gyrus / Top expressed in: fourth ventricle; choroid plexus of fourth ventricle; molar; choroidal fissure; lip; secondary oocyte; skin of abdomen; body of femur; primary oocyte; lumbar spinal ganglion; More reference expression data
BioGPS	n/a
Orthologs
Species	Human	Mouse
Entrez	83648	219148
Ensembl	ENSG00000154319	ENSMUSG00000035095
UniProt	Q96KS9	Q6P1G6
RefSeq (mRNA)	NM_053279	NM_177628
RefSeq (protein)	NP_444509	NP_808296
Location (UCSC)	Chr 8: 11.42 – 11.48 Mb	Chr 14: 63.67 – 63.7 Mb
PubMed search
- Wikidata
View/Edit Human	View/Edit Mouse

Family with sequence similarity 167, member A is a protein in humans that is encoded by the FAM167A gene located on chromosome 8. FAM167A and its paralogs are protein encoding genes containing the conserved domain DUF3259, a protein of unknown function. FAM167A has many orthologs in which the domain of unknown function is highly conserved.

== Gene ==
=== Locus ===
On chromosome 8, FAM167A is positioned between c8orf12 (anti-sense) and BLK (anti-sense). The exact locus of FAM167A is 8p23-22 and spans from 11,278,972 to 11,332,224, a total of 53,253 base pairs. The promoter spans from 11324145 to 11324476 on the negative strand, thereby the first basepair is actually on 11324476. There are no human isoforms found.

=== Aliases ===
Family with Sequence Similarity 167, Member A is also known as FAM167A, c8orf13, or D8S265.

== Homology ==
=== Paralogs ===
FAM167A has one paralog, FAM167B also known as c1orf90. FAM167B is located at 1p35.1 on the plus strand and is composed of 163 amino acids and also contains DUF3259.

=== Orthologs ===
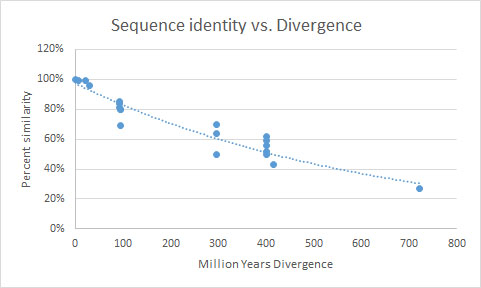
A chart showing divergence and sequence identity

FAM167A has orthologs in 82 organisms and is conserved across chimpanzees, dog, cow, mouse, chicken, rat, frogs, and zebrafish.

Species	Species Common Name	NCBI Accession Number (Protein)	Amino Acid Length	Protein Identity	Divergence date from Humans (million years ago)
Homo Sapiens	Human	NP_444509	214	100%	0
Pan Troglodytes	Chimpanzee	XP_001139122	214	99%	6.3
Macaca Fascicularis	Macaque	XP_005562638.1	214	96%	29
Neterocephalus Glaber	Naked mole rat	XP_004848509	214	84%	92.3
Felis Catus	Cat	XP_003984890	209	80%	94.2
Equus Caballus	Horse	XP_001497968	203	80%	94.2
Alligator Sinensis	Chinese Alligator	XP_006028215	211	70%	296
Anolis Carolinensis	Carolina Anole	XP_003227984	215	64%	296
Danio Rerio	Zebrafish	NP_1020721	204	59%	400.1
Latimeria Chalumnae	African Coelacanth	XP_05994570	148	43%	414.9
Ciona Intestinalis	Sea Squirt	XP_002123421	255	27%	722.5

As shown in the table above, FAM167A is highly conserved across many orthologs of various divergence dates. The exact degree of conservation follows what is expected due to the evolutionary track of a protein.

== Protein ==
=== Primary sequence ===
The gene that encodes FAM167A is 214 amino acids in length. The molecular weight in humans of the FAM167A protein is 24.2 kdal and the isoelectric point is measured to be 5.887 in Homo sapiens. Mouse and chicken orthologs were shown to have a molecular weight of ± 0.5 kdal and isoelectric points were ±0.6.

=== Variants ===
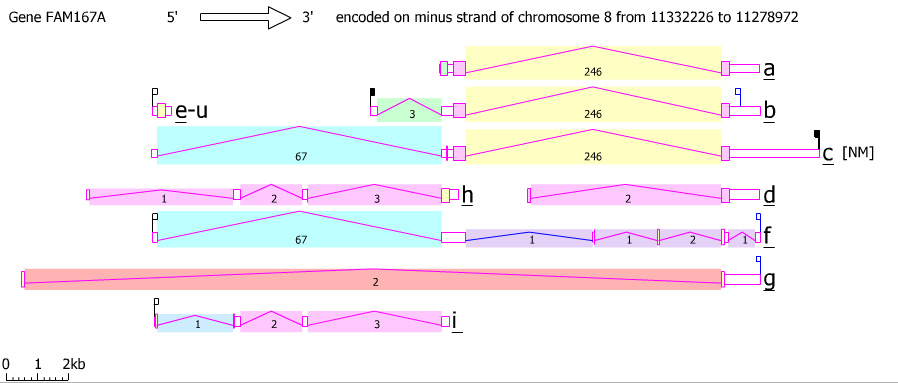
Alternative splices of FAM167A

As per the results on AceView, shown right, the FAM167A gene contains 13 introns. The gene is also "well expressed" at 1.2 times the average gene. Transcription produces 9 different mRNAs, 8 of which are alternatively spliced and 1 unspliced form. 4 of the spliced proteins, which includes 2 isoforms, are considered to be good while the remaining five are partial or not good proteins.

=== Secondary structure ===
FAM167A has a leucine zipper as part of its secondary structure as noted by the four heptad leucine repeat regions shown in SAPS. The leucine zipper is a portion of the DUF domain. Predictions of the secondary structure for the FAM167A protein are mostly that it is made of alpha helices and coiled coils, which would be reasonable as there is a coiled coil domain. The C-terminus end of DUF3259 is generally agreed upon in the PELE program to be a region of potential beta sheets and coiled coils. Using PELE, there is some consensus amongst the eight different outputs given as to the general secondary structure of the protein. There are no transmembrane domains as predicted on the FAM167A protein.

=== Interacting proteins ===
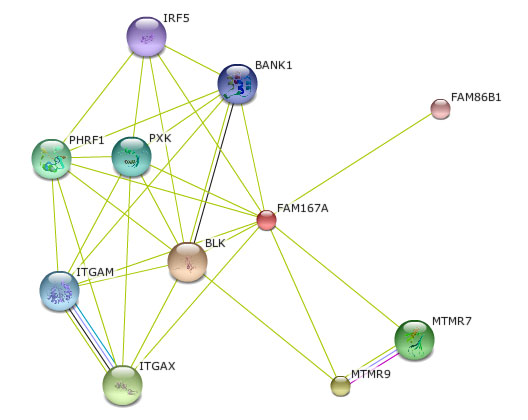
Web of interactions between FAM167A and other proteins

Using the MINT, STRING, and IntAct tools on Genecards, the sources have a consensus on the interactions between FAM167A and BANK1 as well as the BLK gene. These proteins are already known to interact with FAM167A in the development of several diseases such as Sjogren's disease and systemic sclerosis. In both the case of BANK1 and BLK, there is literature to back up the possible connections and interactions between the two proteins in disease development.

=== Post-translational modification ===
No glycosylation sites have been found, as searched using tools on Expasy.org. There was a site for serine phosphorylation on both the human and mouse proteins and two for tyrosine phosphorylation, amino acids 147, 159, and 170 respectfully. Phosphorylation sites are used for various regulatory functions such as enzyme inhibition, protein-protein interactions, and protein degradation.

== Function ==
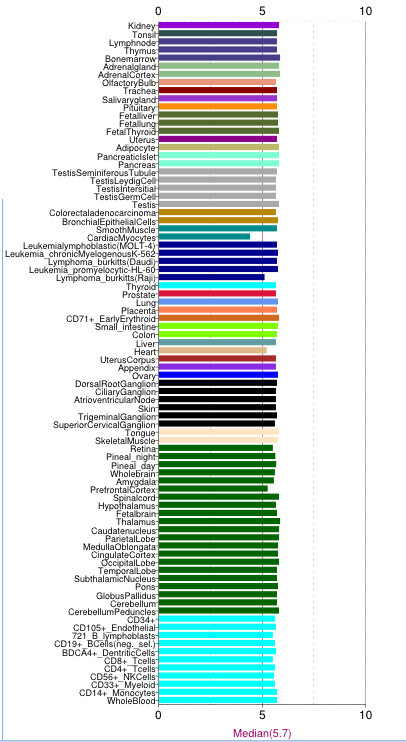
Human tissue expression

Micro arrays show that FAM167A has varied expression in reactions to cancers, but no information regarding the exact function of FAM167A can be drawn from these micro arrays. FAM167A has ubiquitously low expression in all tissues types throughout the body. In mouse it has a higher expression in the skin, B-cells, and spleen, but the same low expression in all other cell types.

== Clinical significance ==
SNPs in the regions between FAM167A and the BLK gene have been associated with the development of Sjogren's syndrome in a Han Chinese population, as well as in a Scandinavian population. The FAM167A-BLK region has also been linked to systemic sclerosis by comparing functional variants in the C8orf13-BLK locus in a Caucasian population. Results of the study confirms the C8orf13-BLK locus as a systemic sclerosis risk locus, strongest effects were observed in the interactions between that locus and BANK1.
