= PURG =

Protein-coding gene in the species Homo sapiens

Identifiers
- Aliases: PURG, PURG-A, PURG-B, purine-rich element binding protein G, purine rich element binding protein G, PURGA, PURGB
- External IDs: OMIM: 618041; MGI: 1922279; GeneCards: PURG

Gene location (Human)
Chr.	Chromosome 8 (human)
Band	8p12	Start	30,995,802 bp
Band	8p12	End	31,033,715 bp

Gene location (Mouse)
Chr.	Chromosome 8 (mouse)
Band	8|8 A3	Start	33,876,353 bp
Band	8|8 A3	End	33,907,495 bp
RNA expression pattern
Bgee	Human / Mouse (ortholog); Top expressed in: sperm; middle temporal gyrus; Brodmann area 23; endothelial cell; cerebellar vermis; entorhinal cortex; postcentral gyrus; internal globus pallidus; superior frontal gyrus; primary visual cortex / Top expressed in: barrel cortex; substantia nigra; superior cervical ganglion; Region I of hippocampus proper; trigeminal ganglion; fossa; condyle; motor neuron; medial geniculate nucleus; medial dorsal nucleus; More reference expression data
BioGPS	n/a
Gene ontology
Molecular function	DNA binding; RNA binding; RNA polymerase II transcription regulatory region sequence-specific DNA binding; DNA-binding transcription factor activity, RNA polymerase II-specific; DNA-binding transcription repressor activity, RNA polymerase II-specific; double-stranded DNA binding; purine-rich negative regulatory element binding; sequence-specific DNA binding
Cellular component	nucleus
Biological process	negative regulation of transcription by RNA polymerase II; regulation of transcription by RNA polymerase II
Sources:Amigo / QuickGO
Orthologs
Databases	NCBI: entry; OMA: entry
Species	Human	Mouse
Entrez	29942	75029
Ensembl	ENSG00000172733	ENSMUSG00000049184
UniProt	Q9UJV8	Q8R4E6
RefSeq (mRNA)	NM_001015508; NM_013357; NM_001323311; NM_001323312	NM_001098233; NM_152821; NM_001382855
RefSeq (protein)	NP_001015508; NP_001310240; NP_001310241; NP_037489	NP_001091703; NP_690034; NP_001369784
Location (UCSC)	Chr 8: 31 – 31.03 Mb	Chr 8: 33.88 – 33.91 Mb
PubMed search
- Wikidata
View/Edit Human	View/Edit Mouse

Purine-rich element binding protein G is a protein that in humans is encoded by the PURG gene.

== Function ==
The exact function of this gene is not known, however, its encoded product is highly similar to purine-rich element binding protein A (PURA). The latter is a DNA-binding protein which binds preferentially to the single strand of the purine-rich element termed PUR, and has been implicated in the control of both DNA replication and transcription. This gene lies in close proximity to the Werner syndrome gene, but on the opposite strand, on chromosome 8p11. Two transcript variants encoding different isoforms have been found for this gene.
