= Zinc finger protein 696 =

Protein found in humans

ZNF696

Identifiers
- Aliases: ZNF696, zinc finger protein 696
- External IDs: GeneCards: ZNF696

Gene location (Human)
Chr.	Chromosome 8 (human)
Band	8q24.3	Start	143,289,676 bp
Band	8q24.3	End	143,299,952 bp
RNA expression pattern
Bgee	Human / Mouse (ortholog); Top expressed in: tendon of biceps brachii; endothelial cell; buccal mucosa cell; internal globus pallidus; vena cava; apex of heart; ventricular zone; right frontal lobe; gonad; anterior cingulate cortex / n/a; More reference expression data
BioGPS	n/a
Gene ontology
Molecular function	DNA-binding transcription factor activity; DNA binding; metal ion binding; nucleic acid binding; DNA-binding transcription factor activity, RNA polymerase II-specific
Cellular component	nucleus
Biological process	regulation of transcription, DNA-templated; transcription, DNA-templated; regulation of transcription by RNA polymerase II
Sources:Amigo / QuickGO
Orthologs
Databases	NCBI: entry; OMA: entry
Species	Human	Mouse
Entrez	79943	n/a
Ensembl	ENSG00000185730	n/a
UniProt	Q9H7X3	n/a
RefSeq (mRNA)	NM_030895	n/a
RefSeq (protein)	NP_112157	n/a
Location (UCSC)	Chr 8: 143.29 – 143.3 Mb	n/a
PubMed search		n/a
- Wikidata
View/Edit Human

Zinc finger protein 696 is a protein that in humans is encoded by the ZNF696 gene.
