= RRS1 =

Protein-coding gene in the species Homo sapiens

Identifiers
- Aliases: RRS1, ribosome biogenesis regulator homolog, ribosome biogenesis regulator 1 homolog
- External IDs: OMIM: 618311; MGI: 1929721; GeneCards: RRS1

Gene location (Human)
Chr.	Chromosome 8 (human)
Band	8q13.1	Start	66,429,014 bp
Band	8q13.1	End	66,430,733 bp

Gene location (Mouse)
Chr.	Chromosome 1 (mouse)
Band	1 A2|1 2.08 cM	Start	9,615,633 bp
Band	1 A2|1 2.08 cM	End	9,617,680 bp
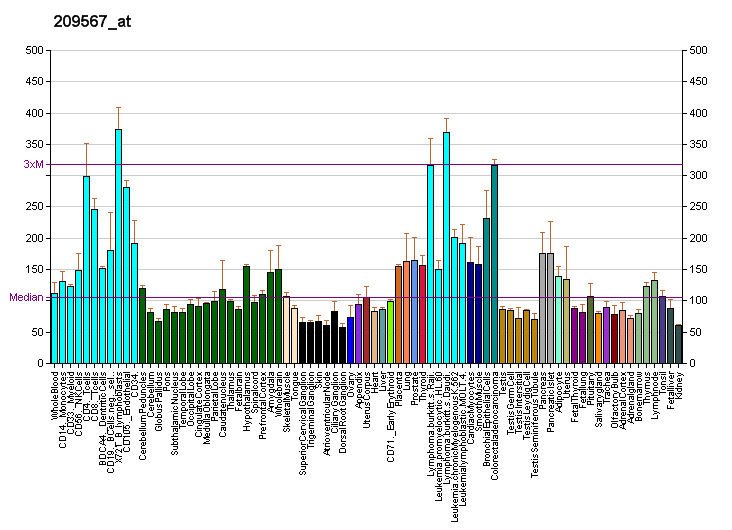
RNA expression pattern
Bgee	Human / Mouse (ortholog); Top expressed in: gastrocnemius muscle; synovial membrane; body of pancreas; skeletal muscle tissue; muscle of thigh; mucosa of transverse colon; monocyte; left uterine tube; body of stomach; left ventricle / Top expressed in: epiblast; otic vesicle; cingulate gyrus; upper arm; mesenchyme; epithelium of small intestine; autopod region; intestinal villus; amygdala; embryo; More reference expression data
BioGPS	More reference expression data
Gene ontology
Molecular function	protein binding; RNA binding; 5S rRNA binding
Cellular component	condensed nuclear chromosome; nucleolus; nucleus; endoplasmic reticulum; preribosome, large subunit precursor; fibrillar center
Biological process	ribosomal large subunit export from nucleus; mitotic metaphase plate congression; ribosome biogenesis; hematopoietic progenitor cell differentiation; endonucleolytic cleavage in ITS1 to separate SSU-rRNA from 5.8S rRNA and LSU-rRNA from tricistronic rRNA transcript (SSU-rRNA, 5.8S rRNA, LSU-rRNA); ribosomal large subunit assembly; ribosomal large subunit biogenesis; protein localization to nucleolus; regulation of signal transduction by p53 class mediator
Sources:Amigo / QuickGO
Orthologs
Databases	NCBI: entry; OMA: entry
Species	Human	Mouse
Entrez	23212	59014
Ensembl	ENSG00000179041	ENSMUSG00000061024
UniProt	Q15050	Q9CYH6
RefSeq (mRNA)	NM_015169	NM_021511
RefSeq (protein)	NP_055984	NP_067486
Location (UCSC)	Chr 8: 66.43 – 66.43 Mb	Chr 1: 9.62 – 9.62 Mb
PubMed search
- Wikidata
View/Edit Human	View/Edit Mouse

Ribosome biogenesis regulatory protein homolog is a protein that in humans is encoded by the RRS1 gene.
