= ODF1 =

Protein-coding gene in the species Homo sapiens

Identifiers
- Aliases: ODF1, CT133, HSPB10, ODF, ODF2, ODF27, ODFP, ODFPG, ODFPGA, ODFPGB, RT7, SODF, outer dense fiber of sperm tails 1
- External IDs: OMIM: 182878; MGI: 97424; GeneCards: ODF1

Gene location (Human)
Chr.	Chromosome 8 (human)
Band	8q22.3	Start	102,551,589 bp
Band	8q22.3	End	102,561,018 bp

Gene location (Mouse)
Chr.	Chromosome 15 (mouse)
Band	15 B3.1|15 15.14 cM	Start	38,219,447 bp
Band	15 B3.1|15 15.14 cM	End	38,226,979 bp
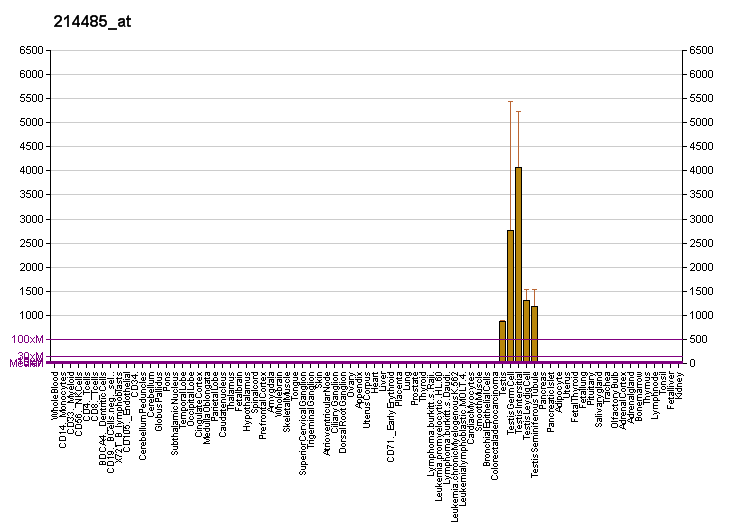
RNA expression pattern
Bgee	Human / Mouse (ortholog); Top expressed in: sperm; right testis; left testis; testicle; gonad; bronchial epithelial cell; tail of epididymis; nucleus accumbens; putamen; caudate nucleus / Top expressed in: seminiferous tubule; spermatid; spermatocyte; embryo; secondary oocyte; primary oocyte; white adipose tissue; skeletal muscle tissue; islet of Langerhans; adrenal gland; More reference expression data
BioGPS	More reference expression data
Gene ontology
Molecular function	protein binding; protein domain specific binding
Cellular component	nucleus; outer dense fiber
Biological process	multicellular organism development; cell differentiation; spermatogenesis
Sources:Amigo / QuickGO
Orthologs
Databases	NCBI: entry; OMA: entry
Species	Human	Mouse
Entrez	4956	18285
Ensembl	ENSG00000155087	ENSMUSG00000061923
UniProt	Q14990	Q61999
RefSeq (mRNA)	NM_024410	NM_008757
RefSeq (protein)	NP_077721	NP_032783
Location (UCSC)	Chr 8: 102.55 – 102.56 Mb	Chr 15: 38.22 – 38.23 Mb
PubMed search
- Wikidata
View/Edit Human	View/Edit Mouse

Outer dense fiber protein 1 is a protein that in humans is encoded by the ODF1 gene.

The outer dense fibers are cytoskeletal structures that surround the axoneme in the middle piece and principal piece of the sperm tail. The fibers function in maintaining the elastic structure and recoil of the sperm tail as well as in protecting the tail from shear forces during epididymal transport and ejaculation. Defects in the outer dense fibers lead to abnormal sperm morphology and infertility. The human outer dense fibers contains at least 10 major proteins and this gene encodes the main protein.
