= Farnesyl-diphosphate farnesyltransferase 1 =

Protein-coding gene in the species Homo sapiens

FDFT1
Available structures
PDB	Ortholog search: PDBe RCSB
PDB	List of PDB id codes 1EZF, 3ASX, 3LEE, 3Q2Z, 3Q30, 3V66, 3VJ8, 3VJ9, 3VJA, 3VJB, 3VJC, 3WC9, 3WCD, 3WCF, 3WCH, 3WCI, 3WCJ, 3WCL, 3WCM, 3WEF, 3WEG, 3WEH, 3WEI, 3WEJ, 3WEK, 3WSA

Identifiers
- Aliases: FDFT1, DGPT, ERG9, SQS, SS, farnesyl-diphosphate farnesyltransferase 1, SQSD
- External IDs: OMIM: 184420; MGI: 102706; HomoloGene: 3281; GeneCards: FDFT1; OMA:FDFT1 - orthologs

Gene location (Human)
Chr.	Chromosome 8 (human)
Band	8p23.1	Start	11,795,573 bp
Band	8p23.1	End	11,839,304 bp

Gene location (Mouse)
Chr.	Chromosome 14 (mouse)
Band	14 D1|14 33.24 cM	Start	63,382,599 bp
Band	14 D1|14 33.24 cM	End	63,417,027 bp
RNA expression pattern
Bgee	Human / Mouse (ortholog); Top expressed in: ganglionic eminence; ventricular zone; mucosa of transverse colon; left testis; C1 segment; right testis; olfactory zone of nasal mucosa; minor salivary glands; right adrenal gland; islet of Langerhans / Top expressed in: primary oocyte; secondary oocyte; zygote; spermatid; ganglionic eminence; testicle; spinal ganglia; genital tubercle; neural tube; mesencephalon; More reference expression data
BioGPS	n/a
Gene ontology
Molecular function	transferase activity; catalytic activity; transferase activity, transferring alkyl or aryl (other than methyl) groups; farnesyl-diphosphate farnesyltransferase activity; squalene synthase activity; protein binding; metal ion binding
Cellular component	integral component of membrane; membrane; intracellular membrane-bounded organelle; endoplasmic reticulum; endoplasmic reticulum membrane
Biological process	steroid metabolic process; sterol biosynthetic process; lipid biosynthetic process; lipid metabolism; cholesterol metabolic process; biosynthesis; isoprenoid biosynthetic process; metabolism; steroid biosynthetic process; cholesterol biosynthetic process; ergosterol biosynthetic process; farnesyl diphosphate metabolic process; regulation of lipid metabolic process; regulation of cholesterol biosynthetic process
Sources:Amigo / QuickGO
Orthologs
Species	Human	Mouse
Entrez	2222	14137
Ensembl	ENSG00000079459; ENSG00000284967	ENSMUSG00000021273
UniProt	P37268; Q6IAX1	P53798
RefSeq (mRNA)	NM_001287742; NM_001287743; NM_001287744; NM_001287745; NM_001287747 NM_001287748; NM_001287749; NM_001287750; NM_001287751; NM_001287756; NM_004462	NM_010191; NM_001360211
RefSeq (protein)	NP_001274671; NP_001274672; NP_001274673; NP_001274674; NP_001274676 NP_001274677; NP_001274678; NP_001274679; NP_001274680; NP_001274685; NP_004453; NP_001274671.1; NP_001274672.1; NP_004453.3	NP_034321; NP_001347140
Location (UCSC)	Chr 8: 11.8 – 11.84 Mb	Chr 14: 63.38 – 63.42 Mb
PubMed search
- Wikidata
View/Edit Human	View/Edit Mouse

Farnesyl-diphosphate farnesyltransferase 1 is a protein that in humans is encoded by the FDFT1 gene.

== Function ==
This gene encodes a membrane-associated enzyme located at a branch point in the mevalonate pathway. The encoded protein is the first specific enzyme in cholesterol biosynthesis, catalyzing the dimerization of two molecules of farnesyl diphosphate in a two-step reaction to form squalene.
