= ZNF707 =

Protein-coding gene in the species Homo sapiens

Identifiers
- Aliases: ZNF707, zinc finger protein 707
- External IDs: MGI: 1916270; GeneCards: ZNF707

Gene location (Human)
| Chr. | Chromosome 8 (human) |
| Band | 8q24.3 | Start | 143,684,452 bp |
| Band | 8q24.3 | End | 143,713,898 bp |

Gene location (Mouse)
| Chr. | Chromosome 15 (mouse) |
| Band | 15|15 D3 | Start | 75,840,972 bp |
| Band | 15|15 D3 | End | 75,847,717 bp |
RNA expression pattern
| Bgee | Human / Mouse (ortholog); Top expressed in: gonad; right testis; left testis; granulocyte; spleen; stromal cell of endometrium; blood; testicle; apex of heart; lymph node / Top expressed in: ascending aorta; aortic valve; left lobe of liver; fossa; Rostral migratory stream; right kidney; condyle; morula; spermatocyte; lumbar subsegment of spinal cord; More reference expression data |
| BioGPS | n/a |
Gene ontology
| Molecular function | DNA binding; protein binding; metal ion binding; nucleic acid binding; DNA-binding transcription factor activity, RNA polymerase II-specific |
| Cellular component | intracellular anatomical structure; nucleus |
| Biological process | regulation of transcription, DNA-templated; transcription, DNA-templated; regulation of transcription by RNA polymerase II |
Sources:Amigo / QuickGO
Orthologs
| Databases | NCBI: entry; OMA: entry |
| Species | Human | Mouse |
| Entrez | 286075 | 69020 |
| Ensembl | ENSG00000274352; ENSG00000181135 | ENSMUSG00000034429 |
| UniProt | Q96C28 | n/a |
| RefSeq (mRNA) | NM_001100598; NM_001100599; NM_001288805; NM_001288806; NM_001288807 NM_001288808; NM_001288809; NM_173831 | NM_001081065; NM_001347040; NM_001361464; NM_001361465 |
| RefSeq (protein) | NP_001094068; NP_001094069; NP_001275734; NP_001275735; NP_001275736 NP_001275737; NP_001275738; NP_776192 | n/a |
| Location (UCSC) | Chr 8: 143.68 – 143.71 Mb | Chr 15: 75.84 – 75.85 Mb |
| PubMed search |
- Wikidata
| View/Edit Human | View/Edit Mouse |

Zinc finger protein 707 is a protein in humans that is encoded by the ZNF707 gene.
