= Zinc finger protein 517 =

Protein found in humans

ZNF517

Identifiers
- Aliases: ZNF517, zinc finger protein 517
- External IDs: GeneCards: ZNF517

Gene location (Human)
Chr.	Chromosome 8 (human)
Band	8q24.3	Start	144,798,876 bp
Band	8q24.3	End	144,811,169 bp
RNA expression pattern
Bgee	Human / Mouse (ortholog); Top expressed in: right hemisphere of cerebellum; right frontal lobe; left ovary; right ovary; body of uterus; right adrenal gland; ganglionic eminence; anterior cingulate cortex; testicle; Brodmann area 9 / n/a; More reference expression data
BioGPS	n/a
Gene ontology
Molecular function	DNA binding; metal ion binding; nucleic acid binding; DNA-binding transcription factor activity, RNA polymerase II-specific
Cellular component	intracellular anatomical structure; nucleus
Biological process	regulation of transcription, DNA-templated; transcription, DNA-templated; regulation of transcription by RNA polymerase II
Sources:Amigo / QuickGO
Orthologs
Databases	NCBI: entry; OMA: entry
Species	Human	Mouse
Entrez	340385	n/a
Ensembl	ENSG00000197363	n/a
UniProt	Q6ZMY9	n/a
RefSeq (mRNA)	NM_213605; NM_001317936; NM_001384904; NM_001384905; NM_001384906 NM_001384907; NM_001384908	n/a
RefSeq (protein)	NP_001304865; NP_998770	n/a
Location (UCSC)	Chr 8: 144.8 – 144.81 Mb	n/a
PubMed search		n/a
- Wikidata
View/Edit Human

Zinc finger protein 517 is a protein that in humans is encoded by the ZNF517 gene.
