= VCPIP1 =

Protein-coding gene in the species Homo sapiens

Identifiers
- Aliases: VCPIP1, DUBA3, VCIP135, valosin containing protein (p97)/p47 complex interacting protein 1, valosin containing protein interacting protein 1
- External IDs: OMIM: 611745; MGI: 1917925; GeneCards: VCPIP1
Enzyme activity
EC #	BRENDA	ExPASy	KEGG	MetaCyc
3.4.19.12	↗	↗	↗	↗

Gene location (Human)
Chr.	Chromosome 8 (human)
Band	8q13.1	Start	66,628,487 bp
Band	8q13.1	End	66,667,231 bp

Gene location (Mouse)
Chr.	Chromosome 1 (mouse)
Band	1|1 A2	Start	9,788,847 bp
Band	1|1 A2	End	9,818,607 bp
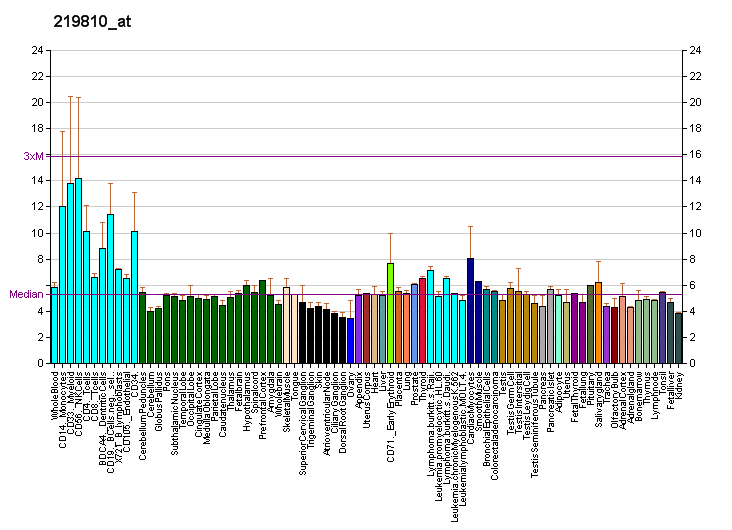
RNA expression pattern
Bgee	Human / Mouse (ortholog); Top expressed in: tendon of biceps brachii; endothelial cell; Achilles tendon; secondary oocyte; testicle; monocyte; middle temporal gyrus; internal globus pallidus; Brodmann area 23; stromal cell of endometrium / Top expressed in: substantia nigra; primary oocyte; superior cervical ganglion; lateral septal nucleus; hand; otolith organ; lateral geniculate nucleus; utricle; cumulus cell; trigeminal ganglion; More reference expression data
BioGPS	More reference expression data
Gene ontology
Molecular function	thiol-dependent deubiquitinase; peptidase activity; cysteine-type peptidase activity; hydrolase activity
Cellular component	cytoplasm; Golgi stack; Golgi apparatus; endoplasmic reticulum; endoplasmic reticulum lumen
Biological process	endoplasmic reticulum membrane fusion; protein K48-linked deubiquitination; Golgi organization; protein ubiquitination; protein K11-linked deubiquitination; proteolysis; Golgi reassembly; mitotic cell cycle
Sources:Amigo / QuickGO
Orthologs
Databases	NCBI: entry; OMA: entry
Species	Human	Mouse
Entrez	80124	70675
Ensembl	ENSG00000175073	ENSMUSG00000045210
UniProt	Q96JH7	Q8CDG3
RefSeq (mRNA)	NM_025054	NM_173443
RefSeq (protein)	NP_079330	NP_775619
Location (UCSC)	Chr 8: 66.63 – 66.67 Mb	Chr 1: 9.79 – 9.82 Mb
PubMed search
- Wikidata
View/Edit Human	View/Edit Mouse

Deubiquitinating protein VCIP135 is a protein that in humans is encoded by the VCPIP1 gene.
