= LRATD2 =

Protein-coding gene in the species Homo sapiens

Identifiers
- Aliases: LRATD2, BCMP101, NSE2, family with sequence similarity 84 member B, FAM84B, LRAT domain containing 2
- External IDs: OMIM: 609483; MGI: 3026924; GeneCards: LRATD2

Gene location (Human)
Chr.	Chromosome 8 (human)
Band	8q24.21	Start	126,552,443 bp
Band	8q24.21	End	126,558,478 bp

Gene location (Mouse)
Chr.	Chromosome 15 (mouse)
Band	15|15 D1	Start	60,690,843 bp
Band	15|15 D1	End	60,725,627 bp
RNA expression pattern
Bgee	Human / Mouse (ortholog); Top expressed in: parotid gland; retinal pigment epithelium; secondary oocyte; ventricular zone; renal medulla; palpebral conjunctiva; skin of arm; pancreatic epithelial cell; oral cavity; buccal mucosa cell / Top expressed in: lobe of prostate; migratory enteric neural crest cell; lacrimal gland; right lung lobe; Paneth cell; secondary oocyte; retinal pigment epithelium; stria vascularis; ileum; left lung lobe; More reference expression data
BioGPS	n/a
Orthologs
Databases	NCBI: entry; OMA: entry
Species	Human	Mouse
Entrez	157638	399603
Ensembl	ENSG00000168672	ENSMUSG00000072568
UniProt	Q96KN1	D3YXJ5
RefSeq (mRNA)	NM_174911	NM_001162926; NM_207269
RefSeq (protein)	NP_777571	NP_001156398
Location (UCSC)	Chr 8: 126.55 – 126.56 Mb	Chr 15: 60.69 – 60.73 Mb
PubMed search
- Wikidata
View/Edit Human	View/Edit Mouse

Protein LRATD2, also known as FAM84B, is a protein that in humans is encoded by the LRATD2 gene.
