= XK related 9 =

Protein-coding gene in the species Homo sapiens

XKR9

Identifiers
- Aliases: XKR9, XRG9, XK related 9, hXKR9
- External IDs: MGI: 2686466; HomoloGene: 20056; GeneCards: XKR9; OMA:XKR9 - orthologs

Gene location (Human)
Chr.	Chromosome 8 (human)
Band	8q13.3	Start	70,669,339 bp
Band	8q13.3	End	70,790,371 bp

Gene location (Mouse)
Chr.	Chromosome 1 (mouse)
Band	1|1 A3	Start	13,738,995 bp
Band	1|1 A3	End	13,771,947 bp
RNA expression pattern
Bgee	Human / Mouse (ortholog); Top expressed in: testicle; gonad; duodenum; right testis; gallbladder; left testis; right lobe of liver; Achilles tendon; islet of Langerhans; right adrenal cortex / Top expressed in: jejunum; ileum; liver; duodenum; embryo; colon; morula; midgut; stomach; proximal tubule; More reference expression data
BioGPS	n/a
Orthologs
Species	Human	Mouse
Entrez	389668	381246
Ensembl	ENSG00000221947	ENSMUSG00000067813
UniProt	Q5GH70	Q5GH62
RefSeq (mRNA)	NM_001011720; NM_001287258; NM_001287259; NM_001287260	NM_001011873
RefSeq (protein)	NP_001011720; NP_001274187; NP_001274188; NP_001274189	NP_001011873
Location (UCSC)	Chr 8: 70.67 – 70.79 Mb	Chr 1: 13.74 – 13.77 Mb
PubMed search
- Wikidata
View/Edit Human	View/Edit Mouse

XK related 9 is a protein that in humans is encoded by the XKR9 gene.
