= GLI family zinc finger 4 =

Protein-coding gene in the species Homo sapiens

GLI4

Identifiers
- Aliases: GLI4, HKR4, ZNF928, GLI family zinc finger 4
- External IDs: OMIM: 165280; GeneCards: GLI4

Gene location (Human)
| Chr. | Chromosome 8 (human) |
| Band | 8q24.3 | Start | 143,267,433 bp |
| Band | 8q24.3 | End | 143,276,931 bp |
RNA expression pattern
| Bgee | Human / Mouse (ortholog); Top expressed in: apex of heart; granulocyte; fundus; right hemisphere of cerebellum; right uterine tube; transverse colon; hippocampus proper; ectocervix; body of stomach; putamen / n/a; More reference expression data |
| BioGPS | n/a |
Gene ontology
| Molecular function | DNA-binding transcription factor activity; DNA binding; metal ion binding; nucleic acid binding; molecular function; DNA-binding transcription factor activity, RNA polymerase II-specific |
| Cellular component | nucleus |
| Biological process | regulation of transcription, DNA-templated; biological process; regulation of transcription by RNA polymerase II |
Sources:Amigo / QuickGO
Orthologs
| Databases | NCBI: entry; OMA: entry |
| Species | Human | Mouse |
| Entrez | 2738 | n/a |
| Ensembl | ENSG00000250571 | n/a |
| UniProt | P10075 | n/a |
| RefSeq (mRNA) | NM_138465 | n/a |
| RefSeq (protein) | NP_612474 | n/a |
| Location (UCSC) | Chr 8: 143.27 – 143.28 Mb | n/a |
| PubMed search | | n/a |
- Wikidata
| View/Edit Human |

GLI family zinc finger 4 is a protein that in humans is encoded by the GLI4 gene.
