= OTUD6B =

Protein-coding gene in the species Homo sapiens

Identifiers
- Aliases: OTUD6B, DUBA-5, DUBA5, CGI-77, OTU domain containing 6B, IDDFSDA, OTU deubiquitinase 6B
- External IDs: OMIM: 612021; MGI: 1919451; GeneCards: OTUD6B
Enzyme activity
| EC # | BRENDA | ExPASy | KEGG | MetaCyc |
|---|---|---|---|---|
| 3.4.19.12 | ↗ | ↗ | ↗ | ↗ |

Gene location (Human)
| Chr. | Chromosome 8 (human) |
| Band | 8q21.3 | Start | 91,070,196 bp |
| Band | 8q21.3 | End | 91,087,095 bp |

Gene location (Mouse)
| Chr. | Chromosome 4 (mouse) |
| Band | 4|4 A1 | Start | 14,809,498 bp |
| Band | 4|4 A1 | End | 14,826,587 bp |
RNA expression pattern
| Bgee | Human / Mouse (ortholog); Top expressed in: sural nerve; pancreatic epithelial cell; Achilles tendon; mucosa of paranasal sinus; corpus callosum; epithelium of colon; ventricular zone; gastrocnemius muscle; deltoid muscle; ganglionic eminence / Top expressed in: morula; muscle of thigh; dentate gyrus of hippocampal formation granule cell; right kidney; spermatid; proximal tubule; epiblast; embryo; neural tube; yolk sac; More reference expression data |
| BioGPS | n/a |
Gene ontology
| Molecular function | peptidase activity; cysteine-type peptidase activity; hydrolase activity; thiol-dependent deubiquitinase |
| Cellular component | eukaryotic translation initiation factor 4F complex |
| Biological process | proteolysis; cell population proliferation; protein deubiquitination; negative regulation of translation; proteasome assembly; positive regulation of translation |
Sources:Amigo / QuickGO
Orthologs
| Databases | NCBI: entry; OMA: entry |
| Species | Human | Mouse |
| Entrez | 51633 | 72201 |
| Ensembl | ENSG00000155100 | ENSMUSG00000040550 |
| UniProt | Q8N6M0 | Q8K2H2 |
| RefSeq (mRNA) | NM_001286745; NM_016023 | NM_152812 |
| RefSeq (protein) | NP_001273674; NP_057107 | NP_690025 |
| Location (UCSC) | Chr 8: 91.07 – 91.09 Mb | Chr 4: 14.81 – 14.83 Mb |
| PubMed search |
- Wikidata
| View/Edit Human | View/Edit Mouse |

OTU domain containing 6B is a protein that in humans is encoded by the OTUD6B gene.

OTUD6B is a functional deubiquitinating enzyme, a class of protease that specifically cleaves ubiquitin linkages, negating the action of ubiquitin ligases. OTUD6B, also known as DUBA5, belongs to a DUB subfamily characterized by an ovarian tumor domain (OTU). OTUD6B function may be connected to growth and proliferation. This hypothesis is supported by a recent study indicating that OTUD6B knock out mice, obtained through exon 4 deletion, are subviable and smaller in size. In humans, OTUD6B mutations have been connected to an intellectual disability syndrome associated with dysmorphic features.
