= TONSL =

Protein-coding gene in the species Homo sapiens

Identifiers
- Aliases: TONSL, IKBR, NFKBIL2, tonsoku-like, DNA repair protein, tonsoku like, DNA repair protein, SEMDSP
- External IDs: OMIM: 604546; MGI: 1919999; GeneCards: TONSL
Available structures
PDB	Ortholog search: PDBe RCSB
PDB	List of PDB id codes 5JA4

Gene location (Human)
Chr.	Chromosome 8 (human)
Band	8q24.3	Start	144,428,775 bp
Band	8q24.3	End	144,444,440 bp

Gene location (Mouse)
Chr.	Chromosome 15 (mouse)
Band	15|15 D3	Start	76,510,202 bp
Band	15|15 D3	End	76,524,158 bp
RNA expression pattern
Bgee	Human / Mouse (ortholog); Top expressed in: mucosa of transverse colon; gonad; ventricular zone; ganglionic eminence; granulocyte; stromal cell of endometrium; right adrenal gland; apex of heart; right adrenal cortex; body of stomach / Top expressed in: internal carotid artery; external carotid artery; spermatocyte; hand; yolk sac; spermatid; gray matter layer of cerebellum; epiblast; primary oocyte; submandibular gland; More reference expression data
BioGPS	n/a
Gene ontology
Molecular function	histone binding; protein binding; transcription corepressor activity
Cellular component	cytoplasm; DNA replication factor A complex; nuclear replication fork; MCM complex; nucleus; FACT complex; nucleoplasm; nuclear body
Biological process	cytoplasmic sequestering of transcription factor; double-strand break repair via homologous recombination; replication fork processing; DNA repair; cellular response to DNA damage stimulus; negative regulation of nucleic acid-templated transcription
Sources:Amigo / QuickGO
Orthologs
Databases	NCBI: entry; OMA: entry
Species	Human	Mouse
Entrez	4796	72749
Ensembl	ENSG00000160949	ENSMUSG00000059323
UniProt	Q96HA7	Q6NZL6
RefSeq (mRNA)	NM_013432	NM_183091
RefSeq (protein)	NP_038460	NP_898914
Location (UCSC)	Chr 8: 144.43 – 144.44 Mb	Chr 15: 76.51 – 76.52 Mb
PubMed search
- Wikidata
View/Edit Human	View/Edit Mouse

Tonsoku-like, DNA repair protein is a protein that in humans is encoded by the TONSL gene.

== Function ==
The protein encoded by this gene is thought to be a negative regulator of NF-kappa-B mediated transcription. The encoded protein may bind NF-kappa-B complexes and trap them in the cytoplasm, preventing them from entering the nucleus and interacting with the DNA. Phosphorylation of this protein targets it for degradation by the ubiquitination pathway, which frees the NF-kappa-B complexes to enter the nucleus.
