= Zinc finger protein 395 =

Protein found in humans

ZNF395

Identifiers
- Aliases: ZNF395, HDBP-2, HDBP2, HDRF-2, PBF, PRF-1, PRF1, Si-1-8-14, zinc finger protein 395
- External IDs: OMIM: 609494; MGI: 2682318; GeneCards: ZNF395

Gene location (Human)
Chr.	Chromosome 8 (human)
Band	8p21.1	Start	28,345,590 bp
Band	8p21.1	End	28,402,701 bp

Gene location (Mouse)
Chr.	Chromosome 14 (mouse)
Band	14|14 D1	Start	65,595,838 bp
Band	14|14 D1	End	65,636,379 bp
RNA expression pattern
Bgee	Human / Mouse (ortholog); Top expressed in: nipple; parietal pleura; tendon of biceps brachii; secondary oocyte; germinal epithelium; left ovary; gastric mucosa; pericardium; cartilage tissue; tonsil / Top expressed in: genital tubercle; tail of embryo; yolk sac; muscle of thigh; neural layer of retina; Gonadal ridge; lip; ventricular zone; thymus; morula; More reference expression data
BioGPS	n/a
Gene ontology
Molecular function	metal ion binding; DNA binding; RNA polymerase II cis-regulatory region sequence-specific DNA binding; nucleic acid binding; cis-regulatory region sequence-specific DNA binding; DNA-binding transcription factor activity, RNA polymerase II-specific
Cellular component	nucleus; cytoplasm; cytosol
Biological process	transcription, DNA-templated; regulation of transcription, DNA-templated; regulation of transcription by RNA polymerase II
Sources:Amigo / QuickGO
Orthologs
Databases	NCBI: entry; OMA: entry
Species	Human	Mouse
Entrez	55893	380912
Ensembl	ENSG00000186918	ENSMUSG00000034522
UniProt	Q9H8N7	E9Q5N9
RefSeq (mRNA)	NM_018660	NM_199029
RefSeq (protein)	NP_061130	NP_950194
Location (UCSC)	Chr 8: 28.35 – 28.4 Mb	Chr 14: 65.6 – 65.64 Mb
PubMed search
- Wikidata
View/Edit Human	View/Edit Mouse

Zinc finger protein 395 is a protein that in humans is encoded by the ZNF395 gene.
