= MYB proto-oncogene like 1 =

Protein-coding gene in the species Homo sapiens

MYBL1

Identifiers
- Aliases: MYBL1, A-MYB, AMYB, MYB proto-oncogene like 1
- External IDs: OMIM: 159405; MGI: 99925; GeneCards: MYBL1

Gene location (Human)
Chr.	Chromosome 8 (human)
Band	8q13.1	Start	66,562,175 bp
Band	8q13.1	End	66,614,247 bp

Gene location (Mouse)
Chr.	Chromosome 1 (mouse)
Band	1 A2|1 2.08 cM	Start	9,737,640 bp
Band	1 A2|1 2.08 cM	End	9,770,434 bp
RNA expression pattern
Bgee	Human / Mouse (ortholog); Top expressed in: Achilles tendon; vena cava; sperm; body of tongue; Skeletal muscle tissue of rectus abdominis; pons; granulocyte; parotid gland; pericardium; superior surface of tongue / Top expressed in: spermatocyte; spermatid; zygote; secondary oocyte; tail of embryo; genital tubercle; female urethra; ventricular zone; primary oocyte; renal corpuscle; More reference expression data
BioGPS	n/a
Gene ontology
Molecular function	RNA polymerase II cis-regulatory region sequence-specific DNA binding; DNA binding; DNA-binding transcription activator activity, RNA polymerase II-specific; DNA-binding transcription factor activity, RNA polymerase II-specific
Cellular component	nucleus
Biological process	positive regulation of transcription, DNA-templated; regulation of transcription, DNA-templated; transcription, DNA-templated; positive regulation of transcription by RNA polymerase II; transcription by RNA polymerase II; mitotic cell cycle; male meiosis I; spermatogenesis; negative regulation of transposition; cell differentiation; piRNA biosynthetic process
Sources:Amigo / QuickGO
Orthologs
Databases	NCBI: entry; OMA: entry
Species	Human	Mouse
Entrez	4603	17864
Ensembl	ENSG00000185697	ENSMUSG00000025912
UniProt	P10243	P51960
RefSeq (mRNA)	NM_001080416; NM_001144755; NM_001294282	NM_001290397; NM_008651
RefSeq (protein)	NP_001073885; NP_001138227; NP_001281211	NP_001277326; NP_032677
Location (UCSC)	Chr 8: 66.56 – 66.61 Mb	Chr 1: 9.74 – 9.77 Mb
PubMed search
- Wikidata
View/Edit Human	View/Edit Mouse

MYB proto-oncogene like 1 is a protein that in humans is encoded by the MYBL1 gene.
