= LACTB2 =

Protein-coding gene in the species Homo sapiens

Identifiers
- Aliases: LACTB2, CGI-83, lactamase beta 2
- External IDs: MGI: 2442551; HomoloGene: 9349; GeneCards: LACTB2; OMA:LACTB2 - orthologs
Available structures
PDB	Ortholog search: PDBe RCSB
PDB	List of PDB id codes 4AD9

Gene location (Human)
Chr.	Chromosome 8 (human)
Band	8q13.3	Start	70,635,318 bp
Band	8q13.3	End	70,669,185 bp

Gene location (Mouse)
Chr.	Chromosome 1 (mouse)
Band	1|1 A3	Start	13,693,554 bp
Band	1|1 A3	End	13,730,770 bp
RNA expression pattern
Bgee	Human / Mouse (ortholog); Top expressed in: right adrenal gland; right adrenal cortex; kidney tubule; left adrenal gland; jejunal mucosa; left adrenal cortex; right ventricle; right lobe of liver; left testis; right testis / Top expressed in: right kidney; left lobe of liver; human kidney; proximal tubule; brown adipose tissue; sternocleidomastoid muscle; morula; intercostal muscle; triceps brachii muscle; digastric muscle; More reference expression data
BioGPS	n/a
Gene ontology
Molecular function	metal ion binding; hydrolase activity; protein binding; nuclease activity; endoribonuclease activity; RNA binding; zinc ion binding; single-stranded RNA binding; endonuclease activity
Cellular component	mitochondrion; mitochondrial matrix
Biological process	RNA phosphodiester bond hydrolysis, endonucleolytic
Sources:Amigo / QuickGO
Orthologs
Species	Human	Mouse
Entrez	51110	212442
Ensembl	ENSG00000147592	ENSMUSG00000025937
UniProt	Q53H82	Q99KR3
RefSeq (mRNA)	NM_016027	NM_145381
RefSeq (protein)	NP_057111	NP_663356
Location (UCSC)	Chr 8: 70.64 – 70.67 Mb	Chr 1: 13.69 – 13.73 Mb
PubMed search
- Wikidata
View/Edit Human	View/Edit Mouse

Lactamase, beta 2 is a protein that in humans is encoded by the LACTB2 gene.

== Structure ==
LACTB2 is located on the 8th chromosome, with its specific location being 8q13.3. The gene contains 7 exons.

The LACTB2 protein has a metallo β-lactamase (MBL) fold, with two zinc ions in the active site.

== Function ==
The metallo beta-lactamases were first identified in bacteria; They give some strains antibiotic resistance by degrading beta-lactam antibiotics (such as penicillins). However, the protein family includes many members that are ribonucleases (RNases), deoxyribonucleases (DNases) and other metabolic enzymes MBL ribonucleases are responsible for RNA processing, generating the 3' end of tRNA,(RNase Z) eukaryotic mRNA (CPSF-73) and snRNA molecules LACTB2 is a mitochondrial endoribonuclease which may have a role in degrading mitochondrial mRNAs.

== Clinical significance ==
A tumor-specific LACTB2-NCOA2 fusion originating from intra-chromosomal rearrangement of chromosome 8 has been identified at both DNA and RNA levels. Unlike conventional oncogenic chimeric proteins, the fusion product lacks functional domains from respective genes, indicative of an amorphic rearrangement. This chimeric LACTB2-NCOA2 transcript was detected in 6 out of 99 (6.1%) colorectal cancer (CRC) cases, where NCOA2 was significantly downregulated. Enforced expression of wild-type NCOA2 but not the LACTB2-NCOA2 fusion protein impaired the pro-tumorigenic phenotypes of CRC cells, whereas knockdown of endogenous NCOA2 in normal colonocytes had opposite effects. Mechanistically, NCOA2 inhibited Wnt/β-catenin signaling through simultaneously upregulating inhibitors and downregulating stimulators of Wnt/β-catenin pathway. NCOA2 is a novel negative growth regulatory gene repressing the Wnt/β-catenin pathway in CRC, where recurrent fusion with LACTB2 contributes to its disruption.
