= Zinc finger protein 706 =

Protein found in humans

ZNF706

Identifiers
- Aliases: ZNF706, PNAS-106, PNAS-113, HSPC038, zinc finger protein 706
- External IDs: MGI: 1915286; GeneCards: ZNF706

Gene location (Human)
Chr.	Chromosome 8 (human)
Band	8q22.3	Start	101,177,878 bp
Band	8q22.3	End	101,206,193 bp

Gene location (Mouse)
Chr.	Chromosome 15 (mouse)
Band	15|15 B3.1	Start	36,997,271 bp
Band	15|15 B3.1	End	37,008,017 bp
RNA expression pattern
Bgee	Human / Mouse (ortholog); Top expressed in: body of pancreas; skin of abdomen; skin of leg; tibial nerve; right testis; left testis; anterior pituitary; minor salivary glands; mucosa of transverse colon; rectum / Top expressed in: vestibular membrane of cochlear duct; condyle; fossa; Paneth cell; morula; morula; right kidney; motor neuron; primitive streak; Epithelium of choroid plexus; More reference expression data
BioGPS	n/a
Gene ontology
Molecular function	metal ion binding
Cellular component	cytoplasm; nucleus
Biological process	negative regulation of stem cell population maintenance; negative regulation of transcription, DNA-templated; regulation of translation
Sources:Amigo / QuickGO
Orthologs
Databases	NCBI: entry; OMA: entry
Species	Human	Mouse
Entrez	51123	68036
Ensembl	ENSG00000120963	ENSMUSG00000062397
UniProt	Q9Y5V0	Q9D115
RefSeq (mRNA)	NM_016096; NM_001042510; NM_001267708; NM_001267709	NM_026521
RefSeq (protein)	NP_001035975; NP_001254637; NP_001254638; NP_057180	NP_080797
Location (UCSC)	Chr 8: 101.18 – 101.21 Mb	Chr 15: 37 – 37.01 Mb
PubMed search
- Wikidata
View/Edit Human	View/Edit Mouse

Zinc finger protein 706 is a protein that in humans is encoded by the ZNF706 gene.
