= Zinc finger matrin-type 4 =

Protein-coding gene in the species Homo sapiens

ZMAT4

Identifiers
- Aliases: ZMAT4, zinc finger matrin-type 4
- External IDs: MGI: 2443497; GeneCards: ZMAT4

Gene location (Human)
Chr.	Chromosome 8 (human)
Band	8p11.21	Start	40,530,590 bp
Band	8p11.21	End	40,897,833 bp

Gene location (Mouse)
Chr.	Chromosome 8 (mouse)
Band	8|8 A2	Start	24,126,035 bp
Band	8|8 A2	End	24,646,601 bp
RNA expression pattern
Bgee	Human / Mouse (ortholog); Top expressed in: middle temporal gyrus; primary visual cortex; Brodmann area 23; testicle; Brodmann area 46; prefrontal cortex; dorsolateral prefrontal cortex; lateral nuclear group of thalamus; Brodmann area 9; right frontal lobe / Top expressed in: medial dorsal nucleus; medial geniculate nucleus; lateral geniculate nucleus; zygote; otolith organ; utricle; secondary oocyte; pontine nuclei; dentate gyrus of hippocampal formation granule cell; primary visual cortex; More reference expression data
BioGPS	n/a
Gene ontology
Molecular function	DNA binding; zinc ion binding; p53 binding; protein binding; metal ion binding; RNA binding; nucleic acid binding
Cellular component	nucleus
Biological process	intrinsic apoptotic signaling pathway by p53 class mediator
Sources:Amigo / QuickGO
Orthologs
Databases	NCBI: entry; OMA: entry
Species	Human	Mouse
Entrez	79698	320158
Ensembl	ENSG00000165061	ENSMUSG00000037492
UniProt	Q9H898	Q8BZ94
RefSeq (mRNA)	NM_001135731; NM_024645	NM_001277239; NM_177086
RefSeq (protein)	NP_001129203; NP_078921	NP_001264168; NP_796060
Location (UCSC)	Chr 8: 40.53 – 40.9 Mb	Chr 8: 24.13 – 24.65 Mb
PubMed search
- Wikidata
View/Edit Human	View/Edit Mouse

Zinc finger matrin-type 4 is a protein that in humans is encoded by the ZMAT4 gene.
