= Kelch repeat and BTB domain-containing 11 =

Protein-coding gene in the species Homo sapiens

KBTBD11

Identifiers
- Aliases: KBTBD11, KLHDC7C, kelch repeat and BTB domain containing 11
- External IDs: MGI: 1922151; GeneCards: KBTBD11

Gene location (Human)
Chr.	Chromosome 8 (human)
Band	8p23.3	Start	1,973,677 bp
Band	8p23.3	End	2,006,936 bp

Gene location (Mouse)
Chr.	Chromosome 8 (mouse)
Band	8|8 A1.1	Start	15,061,025 bp
Band	8|8 A1.1	End	15,083,333 bp
RNA expression pattern
Bgee	Human / Mouse (ortholog); Top expressed in: superior frontal gyrus; ganglionic eminence; Brodmann area 9; primary visual cortex; anterior cingulate cortex; right frontal lobe; prefrontal cortex; amygdala; nucleus accumbens; hippocampus proper / Top expressed in: transitional epithelium of urinary bladder; conjunctival fornix; Region I of hippocampus proper; mesenteric lymph nodes; lateral septal nucleus; ciliary body; nucleus accumbens; dorsal striatum; lobe of cerebellum; cerebellar vermis; More reference expression data
BioGPS	n/a
Gene ontology
Molecular function	ubiquitin-protein transferase activity
Cellular component	Cul3-RING ubiquitin ligase complex
Biological process	protein ubiquitination
Sources:Amigo / QuickGO
Orthologs
Databases	NCBI: entry; OMA: entry
Species	Human	Mouse
Entrez	9920	74901
Ensembl	ENSG00000176595; ENSG00000273645	ENSMUSG00000055675
UniProt	O94819	Q8BNW9
RefSeq (mRNA)	NM_014867	NM_029116
RefSeq (protein)	NP_055682	NP_083392
Location (UCSC)	Chr 8: 1.97 – 2.01 Mb	Chr 8: 15.06 – 15.08 Mb
PubMed search
- Wikidata
View/Edit Human	View/Edit Mouse

Kelch repeat and BTB domain containing 11 is a protein that in humans is encoded by the KBTBD11 gene.
