= PKIA =

Protein-coding gene in the species Homo sapiens

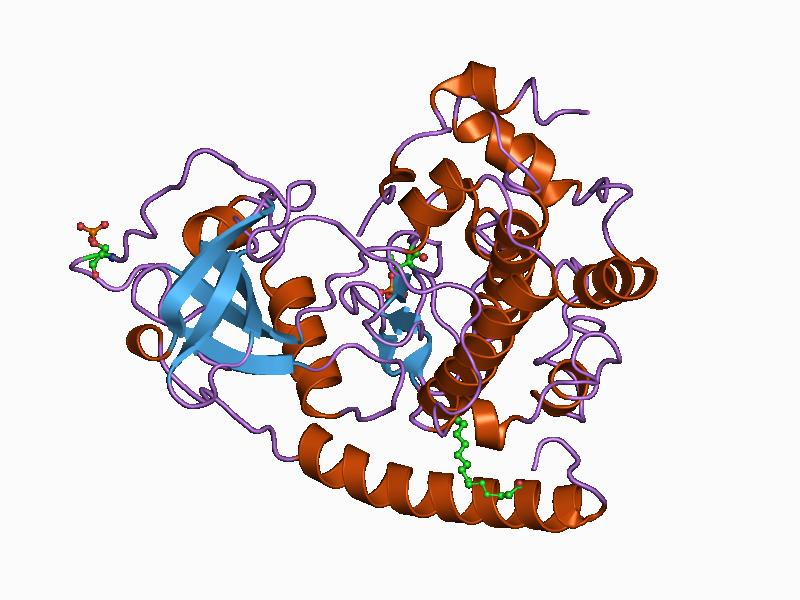
Available structures
| PDB | Ortholog search: PDBe RCSB |
| PDB | List of PDB id codes 1CMK, 1JLU, 1Q8T, 1XH4, 1XH5, 1XH6, 1XH7, 1XH8, 1XH9, 1XHA, 1YDR, 2C1A, 2C1B, 2F7E, 2GNI, 2JDS, 2JDT, 2JDV, 2L1L, 2UVY, 2UVZ, 2UW0, 2UW3, 2UW4, 2UW5, 2UW6, 2UW7, 2UW8, 2VNW, 2VNY, 2VO0, 2VO3, 2VO6, 2VO7, 3AMA, 3AMB, 3L9L, 3L9M, 3L9N, 3MVJ, 3NX8, 3OOG, 3OVV, 3OWP, 3OXT, 3P0M, 3POO, 3VQH, 3WYG, 4AXA, 4IAC, 4IAD, 4IAF, 4IAI, 4IAK, 4IAY, 4IAZ, 4IB0, 4IB1, 4IB3, 4IE9, 4IJ9, 4O21, 4O22, 4WB5, 4WB6, 4WB7, 4WB8, 4Z83, 4Z84, 5DH9, 1Q61, 3X2U, 3X2W, 1Q62, 3X2V, 4UJA, 4UJ9, 4UJB, 4UJ2, 4UJ1 |

Identifiers
- Aliases: PKIA, PRKACN1, protein kinase (cAMP-dependent, catalytic) inhibitor alpha, cAMP-dependent protein kinase inhibitor alpha
- External IDs: OMIM: 606059; MGI: 104747; HomoloGene: 7473; GeneCards: PKIA; OMA:PKIA - orthologs

Gene location (Human)
| Chr. | Chromosome 8 (human) |
| Band | 8q21.13 | Start | 78,516,340 bp |
| Band | 8q21.13 | End | 78,605,267 bp |

Gene location (Mouse)
| Chr. | Chromosome 3 (mouse) |
| Band | 3|3 A1 | Start | 7,431,729 bp |
| Band | 3|3 A1 | End | 7,510,426 bp |
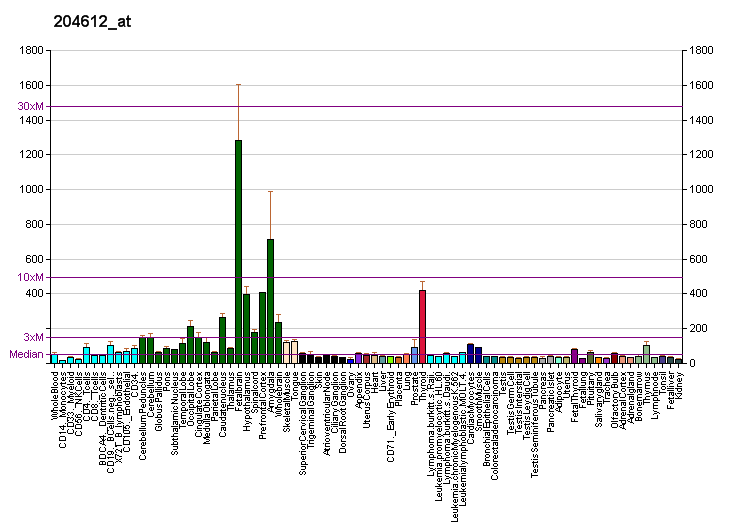
RNA expression pattern
| Bgee | Human / Mouse (ortholog); Top expressed in: biceps brachii; Skeletal muscle tissue of biceps brachii; Skeletal muscle tissue of rectus abdominis; vastus lateralis muscle; muscle of thigh; thoracic diaphragm; deltoid muscle; triceps brachii muscle; right ventricle; myocardium of left ventricle / Top expressed in: barrel cortex; intercostal muscle; triceps brachii muscle; vastus lateralis muscle; sternocleidomastoid muscle; extensor digitorum longus muscle; temporal muscle; soleus muscle; digastric muscle; muscle of thigh; More reference expression data |
| BioGPS | More reference expression data |
Gene ontology
| Molecular function | protein kinase inhibitor activity; protein binding; cAMP-dependent protein kinase inhibitor activity; protein kinase A catalytic subunit binding; kinase activity |
| Cellular component | cytoplasm; nucleus |
| Biological process | regulation of G2/M transition of mitotic cell cycle; negative regulation of catalytic activity; negative regulation of transcription by RNA polymerase II; negative regulation of cAMP-dependent protein kinase activity; negative regulation of protein kinase activity; negative regulation of protein import into nucleus; negative regulation of protein serine/threonine kinase activity; phosphorylation |
Sources:Amigo / QuickGO
Orthologs
| Species | Human | Mouse |
| Entrez | 5569 | 18767 |
| Ensembl | ENSG00000171033 | ENSMUSG00000027499 |
| UniProt | P61925 | P63248 |
| RefSeq (mRNA) | NM_181839; NM_006823 | NM_008862 |
| RefSeq (protein) | NP_006814; NP_862822; NP_006814.1; NP_862822.1 | NP_032888 |
| Location (UCSC) | Chr 8: 78.52 – 78.61 Mb | Chr 3: 7.43 – 7.51 Mb |
| PubMed search |
- Wikidata
| View/Edit Human | View/Edit Mouse |

cAMP-dependent protein kinase inhibitor alpha is a protein that in humans is encoded by the PKIA gene.

The protein encoded by this gene is a member of the cAMP-dependent protein kinase (PKA) inhibitor family. This protein was demonstrated to interact with and inhibit the activities of both C alpha and C beta catalytic subunits of the PKA. Alternatively spliced transcript variants encoding the same protein have been reported.
