= EBAG9 =

Protein-coding gene in the species Homo sapiens

Identifiers
- Aliases: EBAG9, EB9, PDAF, estrogen receptor binding site associated, antigen, 9, estrogen receptor binding site associated antigen 9
- External IDs: OMIM: 605772; MGI: 1859920; HomoloGene: 3107; GeneCards: EBAG9; OMA:EBAG9 - orthologs

Gene location (Human)
Chr.	Chromosome 8 (human)
Band	8q23.2	Start	109,539,711 bp
Band	8q23.2	End	109,565,996 bp

Gene location (Mouse)
Chr.	Chromosome 15 (mouse)
Band	15|15 B3.2	Start	44,482,571 bp
Band	15|15 B3.2	End	44,504,911 bp
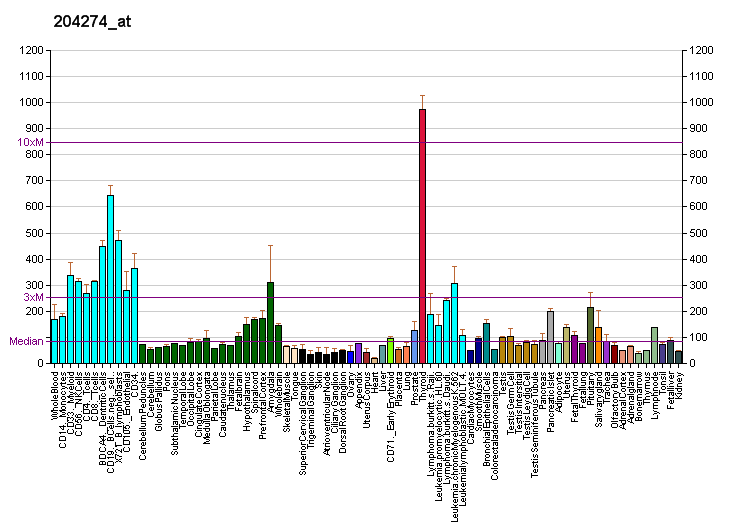

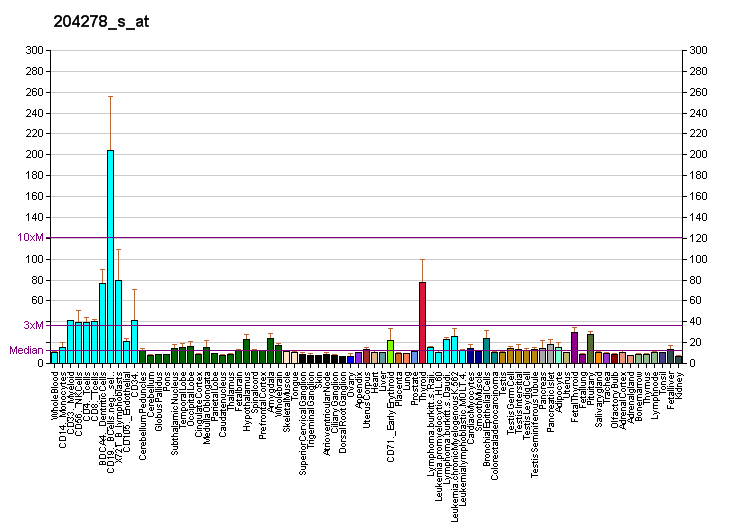
RNA expression pattern
Bgee	Human / Mouse (ortholog); Top expressed in: parotid gland; corpus epididymis; caput epididymis; endothelial cell; Achilles tendon; kidney tubule; tail of epididymis; Brodmann area 23; Epithelium of choroid plexus; glomerulus / Top expressed in: seminal vesicula; parotid gland; submandibular gland; atrioventricular valve; tail of embryo; triceps brachii muscle; endocardial cushion; genital tubercle; migratory enteric neural crest cell; ascending aorta; More reference expression data
BioGPS	More reference expression data
Gene ontology
Molecular function	peptidase activator activity involved in apoptotic process
Cellular component	integral component of membrane; Golgi apparatus; secretory granule; membrane; Golgi membrane
Biological process	regulation of cell growth; apoptotic process
Sources:Amigo / QuickGO
Orthologs
Species	Human	Mouse
Entrez	9166	55960
Ensembl	ENSG00000147654	ENSMUSG00000022339
UniProt	O00559	Q9D0V7
RefSeq (mRNA)	NM_198120; NM_001278938; NM_004215	NM_019480; NM_001357690; NM_001357691
RefSeq (protein)	NP_001265867; NP_004206; NP_936056	NP_062353; NP_001344619; NP_001344620
Location (UCSC)	Chr 8: 109.54 – 109.57 Mb	Chr 15: 44.48 – 44.5 Mb
PubMed search
- Wikidata
View/Edit Human	View/Edit Mouse

Receptor-binding cancer antigen expressed on SiSo cells is a protein that in humans is encoded by the EBAG9 gene.

This gene was identified as an estrogen-responsive gene. Regulation of transcription by estrogen is mediated by estrogen receptor which binds to the estrogen-responsive element (ERE) found in the 5'-flanking region of this gene. The encoded protein is a tumor-associated antigen that is expressed at high frequency in a variety of cancers. Two transcript variants differing in the 5' UTR, but encoding the same protein, have been identified for this gene.
