= KIF13B =

Protein-coding gene in the species Homo sapiens

Identifiers
- Aliases: KIF13B, GAKIN, kinesin family member 13B
- External IDs: OMIM: 607350; MGI: 1098265; GeneCards: KIF13B
Available structures
PDB	Ortholog search: PDBe RCSB
PDB	List of PDB id codes 2COW, 3FM8, 3GBJ, 3MDB

Gene location (Human)
Chr.	Chromosome 8 (human)
Band	8p12	Start	29,067,278 bp
Band	8p12	End	29,263,124 bp

Gene location (Mouse)
Chr.	Chromosome 14 (mouse)
Band	14|14 D1	Start	64,884,714 bp
Band	14|14 D1	End	65,047,066 bp
RNA expression pattern
Bgee	Human / Mouse (ortholog); Top expressed in: olfactory bulb; corpus callosum; inferior ganglion of vagus nerve; internal globus pallidus; renal medulla; subthalamic nucleus; mucosa of ileum; medulla oblongata; C1 segment; sural nerve / Top expressed in: otolith organ; utricle; sciatic nerve; vestibular membrane of cochlear duct; aortic valve; ascending aorta; trigeminal ganglion; gastrula; left colon; lumbar subsegment of spinal cord; More reference expression data
BioGPS	n/a
Gene ontology
Molecular function	microtubule motor activity; nucleotide binding; microtubule binding; 14-3-3 protein binding; ATPase activity; protein binding; ATP binding; protein kinase binding
Cellular component	cytoplasm; cytosol; cell projection; kinesin complex; microvillus; axon; paranode region of axon; microtubule; cytoskeleton
Biological process	protein targeting; cytoskeleton-dependent intracellular transport; regulation of axonogenesis; microtubule-based movement; T cell activation; signal transduction
Sources:Amigo / QuickGO
Orthologs
Databases	NCBI: entry; OMA: entry
Species	Human	Mouse
Entrez	23303	16554
Ensembl	ENSG00000197892	ENSMUSG00000060012
UniProt	Q9NQT8	E9Q4K7
RefSeq (mRNA)	NM_015254	NM_001081177
RefSeq (protein)	NP_056069	NP_001074646
Location (UCSC)	Chr 8: 29.07 – 29.26 Mb	Chr 14: 64.88 – 65.05 Mb
PubMed search
- Wikidata
View/Edit Human	View/Edit Mouse

Kinesin family member 13B is a protein that in humans is encoded by the KIF13B gene.
