= Epiplakin =

Protein-coding gene in the species Homo sapiens

EPPK1

Identifiers
- Aliases: EPPK1, EPIPL, EPIPL1, epiplakin 1
- External IDs: OMIM: 607553; MGI: 2386306; HomoloGene: 20006; GeneCards: EPPK1; OMA:EPPK1 - orthologs

Gene location (Human)
Chr.	Chromosome 8 (human)
Band	8q24.3	Start	143,857,324 bp
Band	8q24.3	End	143,878,467 bp
RNA expression pattern
Bgee	Human / Mouse (ortholog); Top expressed in: skin of hip; skin of thigh; gingival epithelium; epithelium of nasopharynx; tail of epididymis; germinal epithelium; nipple; buccal mucosa cell; bronchial epithelial cell; mucosa of sigmoid colon / n/a; More reference expression data
BioGPS	n/a
Gene ontology
Molecular function	RNA binding; cytoskeletal protein binding; intermediate filament binding; structural molecule activity; keratin filament binding
Cellular component	cytoplasm; cytoskeleton; plasma membrane; bicellular tight junction; membrane; basolateral plasma membrane; apicolateral plasma membrane; cell junction; hemidesmosome; cell projection; keratin filament; cell periphery; perinucleolar compartment; intermediate filament
Biological process	negative regulation of keratinocyte proliferation; negative regulation of cell migration; wound healing; intermediate filament organization; negative regulation of epithelial cell proliferation; negative regulation of keratinocyte migration; negative regulation of wound healing; regulation of epithelium regeneration; cytoskeleton organization; intermediate filament cytoskeleton organization; intermediate filament bundle assembly
Sources:Amigo / QuickGO
Orthologs
Species	Human	Mouse
Entrez	83481	223650
Ensembl	ENSG00000261150	ENSMUSG00000115388
UniProt	P58107	Q8R0W0
RefSeq (mRNA)	NM_031308	NM_144848
RefSeq (protein)	NP_112598	NP_659097
Location (UCSC)	Chr 8: 143.86 – 143.88 Mb	n/a
PubMed search
- Wikidata
View/Edit Human	View/Edit Mouse

Epiplakin is a large cytoplasmic protein that is encoded by the EPPK1 gene in humans. Epiplakin was first identified as an autoantigen.

== Discovery ==
The initial discovery of Epiplakin came from a patient who had a rare autoimmune skin disease that caused blistering at the junction of the epidermis and dermis. After closer examination, scientists saw that the patient's blood had contained autoantibodies that reacted with an unknown protein in the epidermis. The unknown protein was almost entirely made of repeated plakin domains.

== Subcellular distribution ==
The peptide recognition domain of epiplakin is able to bind to keratins in vitro; however, in cells the epiplakin associates with keratin intermediate filaments networks only under conditions in which cellular stress is absent. Otherwise, epiplakin remains universally cytoplasmic and not bound to the intermediate filaments.

== Structure ==
Human epiplakin contains 13 peptide recognition domains (PRDs) and have a total size of about 725 kDa. Unlike plakins, they lack an N-terminal actin-binding domain.

== Function ==
Epiplakin's role in maintaining keratin intermediate filament organization suggests that dysregulation of epiplakin expression or function may contribute to epithelial fragility or altered wound-healing responses, as indicated by accelerated wound closure observed in epiplakin-depleted corneal epithelial cells.

== Clinical significance ==
=== Cancer ===
Scientists have examined EPPK1 expression in multiple types/forms of cancers (bladder, lung, colon, etc.). Various studies show that altered Epiplakin levels in tumor tissues show correlation with tumor progression pathways.
