= Colon cancer associated transcript 1 =

Non-coding RNA in the species Homo sapiens

CCAT1

Identifiers
- Aliases: CCAT1, CARLo-5, onco-lncRNA-40, colon cancer associated transcript 1 (non-protein coding), CARLO5, colon cancer associated transcript 1
- External IDs: OMIM: 617705; GeneCards: CCAT1
Orthologs
| Databases | NCBI: entry |
| Species | Human | Mouse |
| Entrez | 100507056 | n/a |
| Ensembl | n/a | n/a |
| UniProt | n a | n/a |
| RefSeq (mRNA) | n/a | n/a |
| RefSeq (protein) | n/a | n/a |
| Location (UCSC) | n/a | n/a |
| PubMed search | | n/a |
- Wikidata
| View/Edit Human |

Colon cancer associated transcript 1 is a long non-coding RNA that, in humans, is encoded by the CCAT1 gene.

This gene produces a long non-coding RNA that promotes tumor formation and is upregulated in colon cancer and other cancer cell types. This transcript may regulate long range chromosomal interactions, including at the Myc oncoprotein locus. This RNA may also function as a molecular sponge for microRNAs.
