= RNF5P1 =

Pseudogene in the species Homo sapiens

Identifiers
- Aliases: RNF5P1, ring finger protein 5 pseudogene 1
- External IDs: GeneCards: RNF5P1; OMA:RNF5P1 - orthologs
Orthologs
Species	Human	Mouse
Entrez	286140	n/a
Ensembl	n/a	n/a
UniProt	n a	n/a
RefSeq (mRNA)	n/a	n/a
RefSeq (protein)	n/a	n/a
Location (UCSC)	n/a	n/a
PubMed search		n/a
- Wikidata
View/Edit Human

Ring finger protein 5 pseudogene 1, also known as RNF5P1, is a human gene.
