= SNHG6 =

Non-coding RNA in the species Homo sapiens

Identifiers
- Aliases: SNHG6, HBII-276HG, NCRNA00058, U87HG, small nucleolar RNA host gene 6
- External IDs: OMIM: 612215; GeneCards: SNHG6
Orthologs
Databases	NCBI: entry; OMA: entry
Species	Human	Mouse
Entrez	641638	n/a
Ensembl	ENSG00000245910	n/a
UniProt	n a	n/a
RefSeq (mRNA)	n/a	n/a
RefSeq (protein)	n/a	n/a
Location (UCSC)	n/a	n/a
PubMed search		n/a
- Wikidata
View/Edit Human

Small nucleolar RNA host gene 6 is a Long non-coding RNA that in humans is encoded by the SNHG6 gene.
