= Zfp41 zinc finger protein =

Protein-coding gene in the species Homo sapiens

ZFP41

Identifiers
- Aliases: ZFP41, ZNF753, zfp-41, ZFP41 zinc finger protein
- External IDs: MGI: 99186; GeneCards: ZFP41

Gene location (Mouse)
Chr.	Chromosome 15 (mouse)
Band	15|15 D3	Start	75,488,528 bp
Band	15|15 D3	End	75,501,676 bp
RNA expression pattern
Bgee	Human / Mouse (ortholog); Top expressed in: sural nerve; sperm; stromal cell of endometrium; hypothalamus; islet of Langerhans; tibia; prefrontal cortex; amygdala; Brodmann area 23; ganglionic eminence / Top expressed in: hand; genital tubercle; medial ganglionic eminence; tail of embryo; spermatocyte; maxillary prominence; mandibular prominence; ventricular zone; internal carotid artery; external carotid artery; More reference expression data
BioGPS	n/a
Gene ontology
Molecular function	DNA binding; metal ion binding; nucleic acid binding; DNA-binding transcription factor activity, RNA polymerase II-specific
Cellular component	nucleus
Biological process	multicellular organism development; cell differentiation; regulation of transcription, DNA-templated; transcription, DNA-templated; spermatogenesis; regulation of transcription by RNA polymerase II
Sources:Amigo / QuickGO
Orthologs
Databases	NCBI: entry
Species	Human	Mouse
Entrez	286128	22701
Ensembl	n/a	ENSMUSG00000047003
UniProt	Q8N8Y5	Q02526
RefSeq (mRNA)	NM_173832; NM_001271156	NM_001044718; NM_011759
RefSeq (protein)	NP_001258085; NP_776193	NP_001038183; NP_035889
Location (UCSC)	n/a	Chr 15: 75.49 – 75.5 Mb
PubMed search
- Wikidata
View/Edit Human	View/Edit Mouse

ZFP41 zinc finger protein is a protein that in humans is encoded by the ZFP41 gene.
