= PLP-binding protein =

Protein found in humans

PLPBP

Identifiers
- Aliases: PLPBP, PROSC
- External IDs: OMIM: 604436; MGI: 1891207; GeneCards: PLPBP

Gene location (Mouse)
Chr.	Chromosome 8 (mouse)
Band	8|8 A2	Start	27,532,583 bp
Band	8|8 A2	End	27,546,160 bp
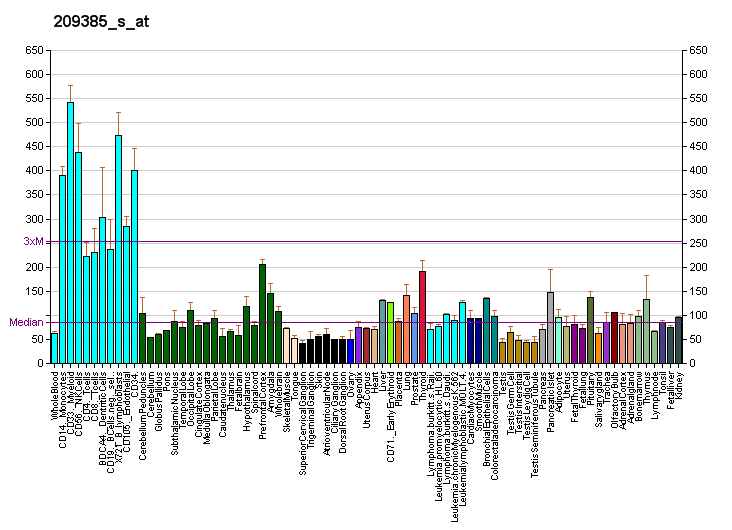

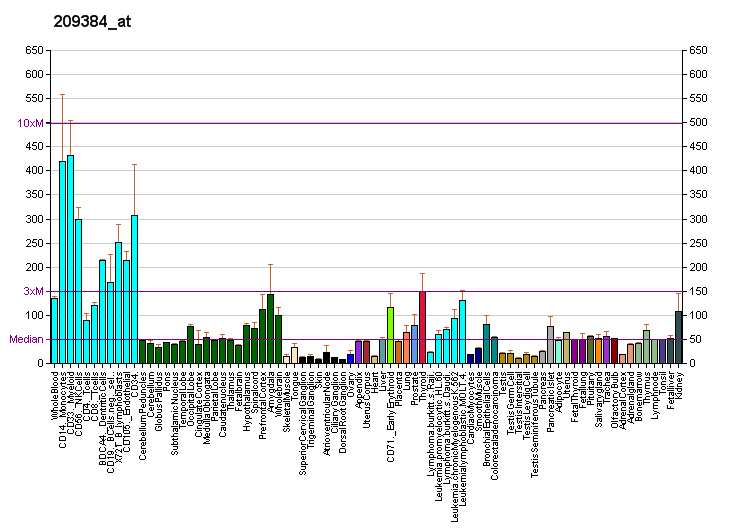

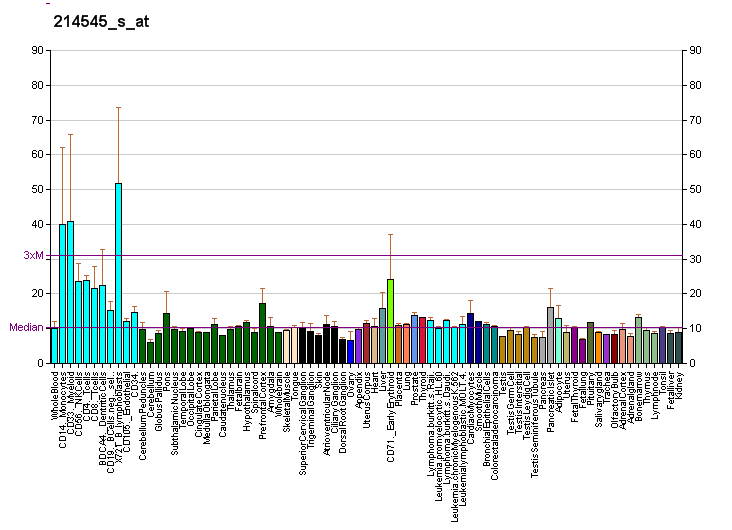
RNA expression pattern
Bgee	Human / Mouse (ortholog); n/a / Top expressed in: gastrula; saccule; left lobe of liver; proximal tubule; decidua; otic placode; right kidney; human kidney; temporal muscle; digastric muscle
BioGPS	More reference expression data
Gene ontology
Molecular function	pyridoxal phosphate binding
Cellular component	cytoplasm; intracellular anatomical structure
Biological process	biological process
Sources:Amigo / QuickGO
Orthologs
Databases	NCBI: entry; OMA: entry
Species	Human	Mouse
Entrez	11212	114863
Ensembl	ENSG00000147471	ENSMUSG00000031485
UniProt	O94903	Q9Z2Y8
RefSeq (mRNA)	NM_007198	NM_001039077; NM_001039078; NM_054057; NM_001363479
RefSeq (protein)	NP_009129; NP_001336275; NP_001336276; NP_001336277; NP_001336278	NP_001034166; NP_001034167; NP_473398; NP_001350408
Location (UCSC)	n/a	Chr 8: 27.53 – 27.55 Mb
PubMed search
- Wikidata
View/Edit Human	View/Edit Mouse

PLP-binding protein is a protein that in humans is encoded by the PLPBP gene (previously PROSC). This protein binds to pyridoxal phosphate (PLP), the active form of vitamin B6, and is involved in regulating its levels inside of the cell.

== Clinical significance ==
Mutations of the PROSC gene cause early-onset vitamin B6-dependent epilepsy (EPVB6D), a disease first described in 2016.
