= Cysteine-rich secretory protein LCCL domain-containing 1 =

Protein-coding gene in the species Homo sapiens

An Error has occurred retrieving Wikidata item for infobox

Cysteine rich secretory protein LCCL domain containing 1 is a protein that in humans is encoded by the CRISPLD1 gene.
