= Chondroitin sulfate N-acetylgalactosaminyltransferase 1 =

Protein-coding gene in humans

CSGALNACT1

Identifiers
- Aliases: CSGALNACT1, CSGalNAcT-1, ChGn, beta4GalNAcT, chondroitin sulfate N-acetylgalactosaminyltransferase 1
- External IDs: OMIM: 616615; MGI: 2442354; GeneCards: CSGALNACT1
Enzyme activity
EC #	BRENDA	ExPASy	KEGG	MetaCyc
2.4.1.174	↗	↗	↗	↗

Gene location (Mouse)
Chr.	Chromosome 8 (mouse)
Band	8|8 B3.3	Start	68,809,433 bp
Band	8|8 B3.3	End	69,187,798 bp
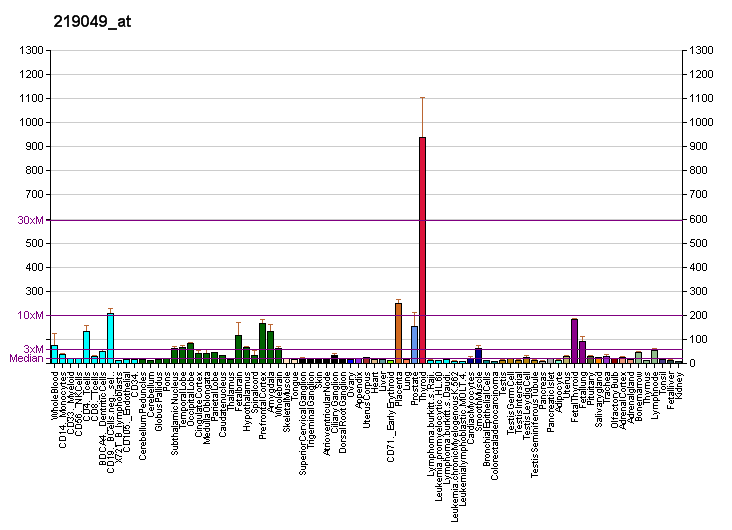
RNA expression pattern
Bgee	Human / Mouse (ortholog); n/a / Top expressed in: stroma of bone marrow; blood; Epithelium of choroid plexus; hair follicle; sciatic nerve; proximal tubule; motor neuron; pituitary gland; endothelial cell of lymphatic vessel; fossa
BioGPS	More reference expression data
Gene ontology
Molecular function	transferase activity; glucuronosyltransferase activity; metal ion binding; peptidoglycan glycosyltransferase activity; glucuronylgalactosylproteoglycan 4-beta-N-acetylgalactosaminyltransferase activity; acetylgalactosaminyltransferase activity; glucuronosyl-N-acetylgalactosaminyl-proteoglycan 4-beta-N-acetylgalactosaminyltransferase activity
Cellular component	integral component of membrane; integral component of Golgi membrane; Golgi apparatus; membrane; Golgi membrane; intracellular anatomical structure; Golgi cisterna membrane
Biological process	UDP-N-acetylgalactosamine metabolic process; heparan sulfate proteoglycan biosynthetic process, polysaccharide chain biosynthetic process; heparin biosynthetic process; cell recognition; chondroitin sulfate biosynthetic process; anatomical structure morphogenesis; extracellular matrix organization; endochondral ossification; UDP-glucuronate metabolic process; nervous system development; cartilage development; chondroitin sulfate proteoglycan biosynthetic process, polysaccharide chain biosynthetic process; chondroitin sulfate proteoglycan biosynthetic process; cell population proliferation; proteoglycan biosynthetic process; dermatan sulfate proteoglycan biosynthetic process; chondroitin sulfate metabolic process
Sources:Amigo / QuickGO
Orthologs
Databases	NCBI: entry; OMA: entry
Species	Human	Mouse
Entrez	55790	234356
Ensembl	ENSG00000147408	ENSMUSG00000036356
UniProt	Q8TDX6	Q8BJQ9
RefSeq (mRNA)	NM_001130518; NM_018371	NM_001252623; NM_172753; NM_001364256
RefSeq (protein)	NP_001123990; NP_060841; NP_001341405; NP_001341406; NP_001341409 NP_001341410; NP_001341412; NP_001341413; NP_001341414; NP_001341416; NP_001341417; NP_001341418; NP_001341419; NP_001341420; NP_001341421; NP_001341423; NP_001341424; NP_001341425; NP_001341426; NP_001341427; NP_001341428; NP_001341404	NP_001239552; NP_766341; NP_001351185
Location (UCSC)	n/a	Chr 8: 68.81 – 69.19 Mb
PubMed search
- Wikidata
View/Edit Human	View/Edit Mouse

Chondroitin sulfate N-acetylgalactosaminyltransferase 1 is an enzyme that in humans is encoded by the CSGALNACT1 gene.

== Clinical ==
A form of mild skeletal dysplasia has been associated with mutations in this gene.
