= Gollop-Wolfgang complex =

- Specialty: Medical genetics
- Symptoms: Complex of skeletal and digital anomalies
- Usual onset: Conception
- Duration: Lifelong
- Causes: Genetic mutation
- Prevention: none
- Prognosis: Good
- Frequency: 1-9 in 1,000,000

Gollop-Wolfgang complex is a very rare genetic disorder which is characterized by skeletal and digital anomalies.

== Signs and symptoms ==
This complex consists of the following symptoms:

- Bifid femur
- Hypoplastic/aplastic tibia and ulnae bone
- Shortening of the limbs
- Ectrodactyly

== Causes ==
When the genome of an isolated case of Gollop-Wolfgang complex was analyzed, Asamoah et al. discovered a deletion in the long arm of chromosome 8, this deletion consisted of the absence of 8q11.23-q13.3.

== Epidemiology ==
The condition has an estimated prevalence of 1-9 in 1,000,000 individuals. According to OMIM, only 26 cases have been described in medical literature. According to ORPHANET, 200 cases have been reported.
