= CA8 =

CA8 may refer to:

- California's 8th congressional district
- California State Route 8 (disambiguation)
- Carbonic anhydrase-related protein, encoded by the CA8 gene
- United States Court of Appeals for the Eighth Circuit
