= ADCY5 =

Protein-coding gene in the species Homo sapiens

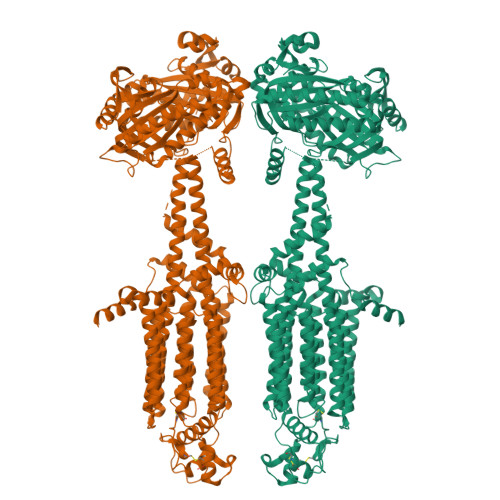

Identifiers
- Aliases: ADCY5, AC5, FDFM, adenylate cyclase 5, DSKOD
- External IDs: OMIM: 600293; MGI: 99673; GeneCards: ADCY5
Enzyme activity
EC #	BRENDA	ExPASy	KEGG	MetaCyc
4.6.1.1	↗	↗	↗	↗

Gene location (Human)
Chr.	Chromosome 3 (human)
Band	3q21.1	Start	123,282,296 bp
Band	3q21.1	End	123,449,090 bp

Gene location (Mouse)
Chr.	Chromosome 16 (mouse)
Band	16|16 B3	Start	34,975,247 bp
Band	16|16 B3	End	35,126,108 bp
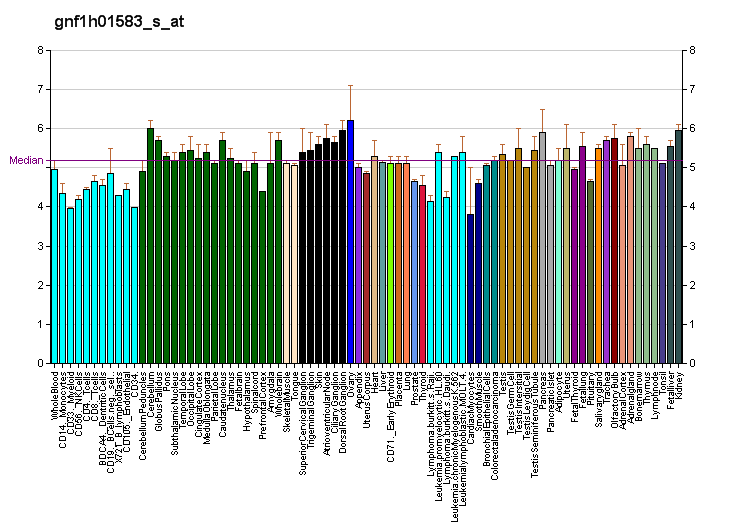

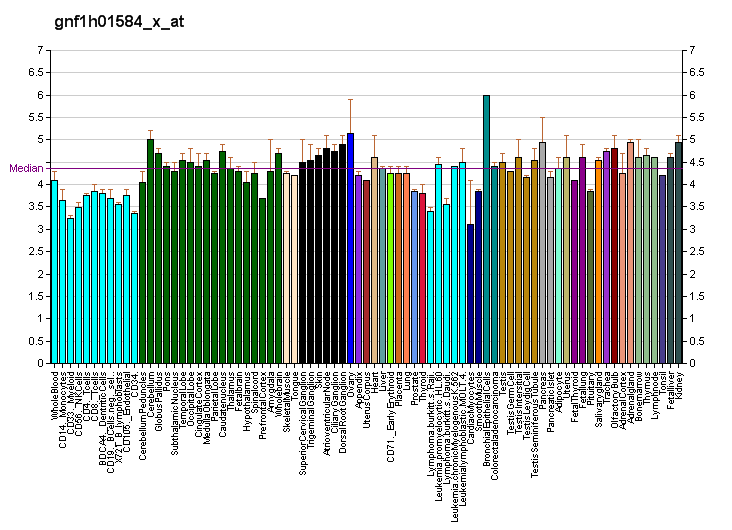
RNA expression pattern
Bgee	Human / Mouse (ortholog); Top expressed in: apex of heart; gastric mucosa; right coronary artery; popliteal artery; tibial arteries; right auricle of heart; left ventricle; putamen; nucleus accumbens; cardiac muscle tissue of right atrium / Top expressed in: olfactory tubercle; nucleus accumbens; ascending aorta; globus pallidus; superior frontal gyrus; nucleus of stria terminalis; aortic valve; lateral septal nucleus; temporal lobe; amygdala; More reference expression data
BioGPS	More reference expression data
Gene ontology
Molecular function	nucleotide binding; adenylate cyclase binding; metal ion binding; lyase activity; protein heterodimerization activity; adenylate cyclase activity; phosphorus-oxygen lyase activity; ATP binding; scaffold protein binding; guanylate cyclase activity
Cellular component	integral component of membrane; cell projection; membrane; plasma membrane; cilium; intermediate filament cytoskeleton; guanylate cyclase complex, soluble; integral component of plasma membrane
Biological process	cAMP biosynthetic process; G protein-coupled adenosine receptor signaling pathway; adenylate cyclase-activating dopamine receptor signaling pathway; regulation of insulin secretion involved in cellular response to glucose stimulus; intracellular signal transduction; cellular response to forskolin; adenylate cyclase-activating G protein-coupled receptor signaling pathway; locomotory behavior; neuromuscular process controlling balance; positive regulation of cytosolic calcium ion concentration; cellular response to glucagon stimulus; cyclic nucleotide biosynthetic process; adenylate cyclase-inhibiting dopamine receptor signaling pathway; renal water homeostasis; cGMP biosynthetic process; adenylate cyclase-inhibiting G protein-coupled receptor signaling pathway; G protein-coupled receptor signaling pathway; activation of adenylate cyclase activity; activation of protein kinase A activity
Sources:Amigo / QuickGO
Orthologs
Databases	NCBI: entry; OMA: entry
Species	Human	Mouse
Entrez	111	224129
Ensembl	ENSG00000173175	ENSMUSG00000022840
UniProt	O95622	P84309
RefSeq (mRNA)	NM_001199642; NM_183357; NM_001378259	NM_001012765
RefSeq (protein)	NP_001186571; NP_899200; NP_001365188	NP_001012783
Location (UCSC)	Chr 3: 123.28 – 123.45 Mb	Chr 16: 34.98 – 35.13 Mb
PubMed search
- Wikidata
View/Edit Human	View/Edit Mouse

Adenylyl cyclase type 5 is an enzyme that in humans is encoded by the ADCY5 gene.

The human ADCY5 gene is located on the long arm of chromosome 3 and codes for the enzyme Adenylyl Cyclase 5 (AC5). This membrane protein has catalytic activity to convert adenosine triphosphate (ATP) into cyclic adenosine monophosphate (cAMP). In the brain, this enzyme is highly expressed in medium spiny neurons (MSNs) in the striatum. It is also found in non-neuronal cells such as cardiomyocytes and pancreatic islets. AC5 plays a role in several physiological processes including the modulation of neuronal activity particularly in the striatum, thus variants in ADCY5 gene typically lead to movement disorders.

== Structure ==
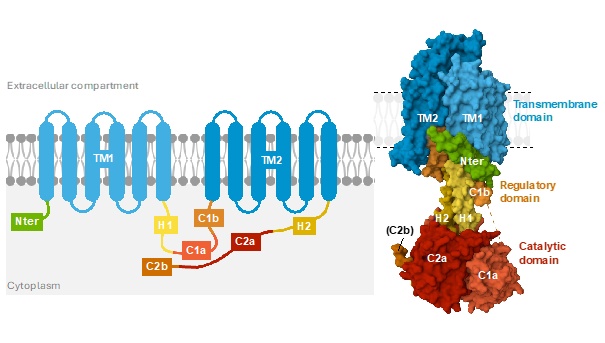
AC5 is a transmembrane protein with a cytoplasmic catalytic domain separated from the membrane by a coiled-coil stem which is part of its regulatory domain

AC5 is encoded by the ADCY5 gene, located on the long arm of chromosome 3. The AC5 protein is composed of an intracytoplasmic N-terminal domain, a first membrane subdomain of 6 transmembrane segments, a first catalytic subdomain (C1a), a regulatory domain (C1b), a second membrane subdomain of 6 transmembrane segments, and a second catalytic subdomain (C2a). In contrast to other ACs, AC5 doesn't have a complete C-terminal regulatory domain (C2b). In the cytoplasm, the 2 catalytic subdomains associate to form the catalytic domain, binding ATP and converting it into cAMP. The 2 membrane subdomains are associated to form a single bundle in the plasmic membrane. The transmembrane domain is prolonged by 2 cytoplasmic helices (H1 and H2) forming a coiled-coil domain which separates the core catalytic domain from the membrane. The conformation of the C1b regulatory and coiled-coil domains as well as their association with the various subunits of the G proteins change the dynamic conformation of the 2 catalytic subdomains and impact the catalytic activity of AC5. The N-terminal domain may participate in regulation by G proteins; however, its structural organization is only partly solved.

== Function ==
The mammalian adenylyl cyclase family comprises nine membrane adenylyl cyclases (mACs, AC1-9), and one soluble adenylyl cyclase (sAC, AC10). As an adenylyl cyclase, AC5 catalyses the production of the second messenger cAMP from ATP, under the regulation of G proteins. The level of cellular cAMP controls the activity of protein kinase A (PKA), which phosphorylates target proteins. Upon phosphorylation, these effectors allow the cellular response to stimulation of G protein-coupled receptors (GPCR). However, AC5 differs from other mACs by its sequence and length, its expression pattern and its regulation. AC5 has been identified as the primary AC isoform expressed in MSNs. The striatum controls movement via a subtle balance between the activity of two types of MSNs: the striato-nigral MSNs of the direct pathway that facilitate movement execution and the striato-pallidal MSNs of the indirect pathway that inhibit movement execution. The synthesis of cAMP by AC5 in MSNs is finely regulated by G protein-coupled receptors. AC5 is activated by the Gαolf protein (encoded by the GNAL gene) downstream of the D1 dopamine receptor (D1R) in the direct pathway and the adenosine A_{2A} receptor (A_{2A}R) in the indirect pathway, while it is inhibited by Gαi/o downstream of the D2 dopamine receptors (D2R) in the indirect pathway and the adenosine A_{1} receptor (A_{1}R) in the direct pathway. cAMP levels in direct/indirect MSNs are critical for the activation of their target neurons, and thus facilitation or inhibition of movement.

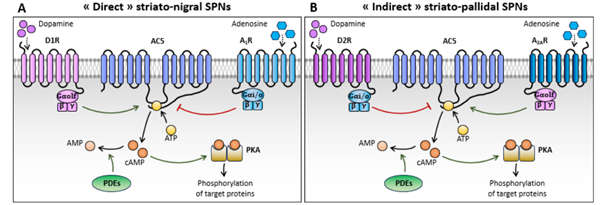
AC5 is the key enzyme in the cAMP signalling pathway responding to dopamine and adenosine in MSNs

== Interactions ==
In MSNs, AC5 associates with the heterotrimeric protein G containing Gαolf, Gβ2 and Gγ7. In vitro, AC5 can also interact with Gβ1 and Gγ2 through its N-terminal domain. AC5 has been shown to interact with RGS2.

== Clinical significance ==
=== Mixed movement disorders ===
Mixed movement disorders linked to ADCY5 (MxMD-ADCY5) is a rare childhood-onset hyperkinetic disease due to pathogenic variants in the ADCY5 gene.

==== Symptoms and diagnosis ====
ADCY5-related movement disorder is named after the causative gene ADCY5, found in 2012 via whole exome sequencing. However, the first patient's description was made in 1967 as “paroxysmal choreoathetosis”. This case and her family history were reappraised when her daughter started to have similar manifestations, then described as “familial dyskinesia with facial myokymia”. This disease is presently referred to as MxMD-ADCY5 since the phenotypic spectrum has been more extensively studied. Indeed, the clinical spectrum is very broad and is typically characterized by a variable combination of permanent and paroxysmal hyperkinetic movements such as myoclonus, chorea, tremor and/or dystonia. These symptoms can be more or less severe but, in most cases, hamper the quality of life of patients. The occurrence of paroxysmal nocturnal dyskinesias and the presence of perioral twitches are particularly suggestive of the diagnosis. These dyskinesias are sometimes associated with other symptoms such as axial hypotonia, speech disturbance, oculomotor signs, pyramidal syndrome, developmental delay, psychiatric disorders or intellectual disability. Likewise, a few patients have been reported with heart failure, raising the possibility of cardiac involvement.

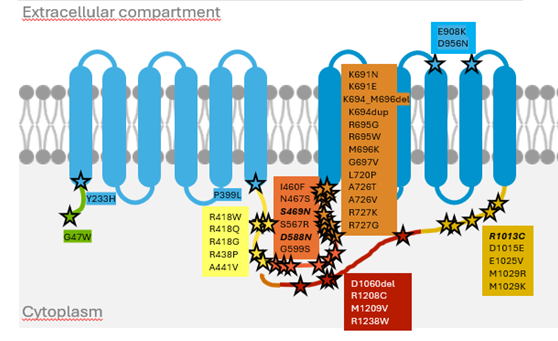
Missense and small indels variants associated with MxMD-ADCY5 Dominant variant / Recessive variant

==== Genetics ====
MxMD-ADCY5 is most often transmitted in an autosomal dominant manner and more rarely autosomal recessive. The occurrence of somatic mosaicism is unexpectedly frequent in MxMD-ADCY5, with a less severe phenotype. The most described causal variant is the dominant mutation R418W situated in the coiled-coil domain of AC5. Most of the known variants are concentrated in the coiled-coil, catalytic (C1a and C2a) and regulatory (C1b) domains of AC5 suggesting a dysregulation of its enzymatic activity in patients.

==== Pathophysiology ====
The pathophysiology of this disease is based on a deregulation of the cAMP pathway in the striatum linked to ADCY5 mutations, disrupting the balance between the direct and indirect pathways of movement control. In vitro functional studies have shown a gain of function for several dominant non-truncating mutations altering cAMP production after G protein-coupled receptors stimulation compared to wildtype AC5. The pathophysiology of truncating and/or recessive variants is poorly known.

==== Treatment ====
The pathophysiological mechanisms and preliminary evidence designate adenosine A_{2A} receptors’ antagonists, namely caffeine, istradefylline and theophylline, as potential first line treatments. Symptomatic treatment with benzodiazepine might also be useful to some patients, especially to treat nighttime dyskinesia. In severe forms, bilateral deep brain stimulation of the globus pallidus internus (GPi-DBS) could be considered, with variable outcomes.

=== Other clinical implications ===
ADCY5 polymorphisms are also associated with neuropsychiatric and central nervous system disorders, notably alcoholism, depression or autism.

ADCY5 seems to play a role in cardiac function and may be involved in both longevity and stress resistance. Indeed, mice with a complete depletion of ADCY5 live significantly longer than control littermates and are resistant to cardiac stress.
