= Coiled-coil domain-containing protein 25 =

Protein found in humans

An Error has occurred retrieving Wikidata item for infobox

The Coiled-Coil Domain Containing Protein – 25 (CCDC25) is a human protein whose function is not presently understood.

== Gene ==
The gene encoding the CCDC25 protein is located at 8p21.1, on the short arm of human chromosome 8, and is transcribed into an mRNA product approximately 3,583 nucleotides in length.

== Protein ==
=== General ===
The protein is highly conserved among mammals as well as eukaryotes as diverse as Arabidopsis thaliana. CCDC25 is made up of a single polypeptide chain 208 amino acids in length and is expressed at a high level, nearly 4.2 times that of a normal human protein. Its expression is nearly ubiquitous in human tissues with little indication that its expression level changes drastically in diseased tissues. Despite currently lacking a well understood function, CCDC25 is predicted to localize to the nucleus and was shown by a microarray experiment to be upregulated in Metaphase II oocytes.

=== Interactions ===
CCDC25 was shown by a yeast-two-hybrid assay to interact with Smad2, a latent transcription factor that is part of the TGF-β signaling pathway. The protein is a predicted substrate of Casein Kinase 1, Casein Kinase 2, cGMP-dependent protein kinase, and the Insulin Receptor; all of which have well defined roles in cell signaling.
