= Uta Francke =

German-American physician-geneticist

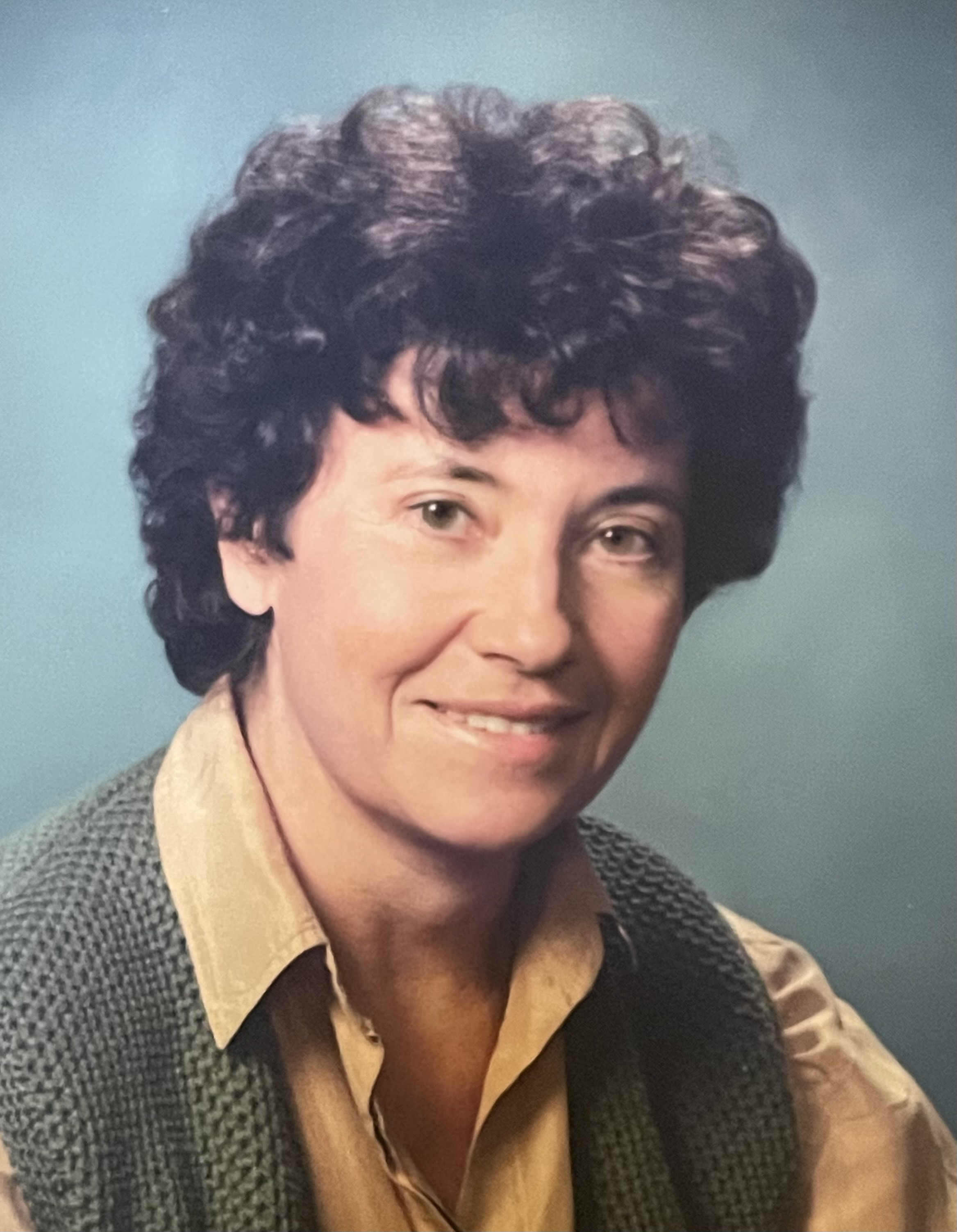
- Uta Francke (in 1989, age 46)
- Born: 1942 (age 83–84) near Frankfurt, Germany
- Education: Goethe University Frankfurt; Marburg University; LMU Munich (Dr. med., 1967)
- Known for: Gene mapping, Prader-Willi syndrome, Rett syndrome, Marfan syndrome, Williams syndrome, Wiskott–Aldrich syndrome
- Scientific career
- Fields: Human genetics, Medical genetics, Cytogenetics
- Workplaces: Stanford University School of Medicine; Yale University School of Medicine; University of California, San Diego; 23andMe

Uta Francke (born 1942) is a German American physician–geneticist whose work has profoundly shaped modern human genetics. Over a career spanning more than five decades, she has played a central role in mapping genes to specific chromosomal locations, identifying disease-causing mutations, and advancing the understanding of rare genetic disorders. Her research laid crucial groundwork for the Human Genome Project and helped define the molecular basis of conditions such as Prader-Willi syndrome and Rett syndrome.

Francke is currently Professor of Genetics, Emerita, and Professor of Pediatrics (active) at Stanford University School of Medicine. In addition to her academic work, she has contributed to the biotechnology industry, notably serving as a consultant and later Senior Medical Director at 23andMe. She is also a past president of the American Society of Human Genetics and a founding member of the American College of Medical Genetics.

== Early life and education ==
Francke was born in 1942 in a small town just north of Frankfurt, Germany. Her father, who had a law degree, fought for Germany in World War II, and her mother was an elementary school teacher. Francke's father died from what was assumed as a heart attack at age 46, when she was 12 years old.

Francke received her baccalaureate from Aufbaugymnasium Idstein in 1961 where she became interested in pursuing medicine. She studied medicine at the Goethe University Frankfurt (1961-1962), Marburg University (1962-1963) and LMU Munich (1963-1967) where she graduated in 1967 receiving a medical degree (Dr. med.). She immigrated to California, United States in 1969 after having completed a 2-year internship at the Rechts der Isar Hospital of the Technical University of Munich.

Francke got a license to fly a small plane and joined a flying club in New Haven.

== Career ==
After moving to the United States, Francke completed her residency in pediatrics at Children's Hospital Los Angeles from 1969 to 1970. She subsequently undertook postdoctoral fellowships in medical genetics at the University of California Los Angeles from 1970 to 1971 and at the University of California San Diego from 1971 to 1973. During this period, she began her research in cytogenetics, which became the starting point of her scientific career.

Francke was certified by the American Board of Pediatrics in 1981. In 1982, she was certified by the American Board of Medical Genetics in Clinical Genetics and Clinical Cytogenetics, and she later obtained certification in Clinical Molecular Genetics, with recertifications in 1993, 2003, and 2008.

From 1973 to 1978 she worked as Assistant Professor of Pediatrics (in residence), at the University of California San Diego. From 1975 to 1978 she held the position of Director of Medical Genetics at the San Diego Children's Hospital and Health Center as well as Director of the Cytogenetics and Cell Genetics Laboratory in the Department of Pediatrics at the University of California San Diego.

In 1978, Francke moved to New Haven, Connecticut and took the position of Associate Professor of Human Genetics and Pediatrics in the Department of Human Genetics at Yale University School of Medicine.

From 1984 to 1985, she trained in molecular genetics as a visiting scientist in the laboratory of Hans Lehrach at the European Molecular Biology Laboratory in Germany.

In 1985, she was promoted to Professor of Human Genetics and Pediatrics as well as Director of Postdoctoral Training Program in Medical Genetics at Yale University School of Medicine, where she worked until her return to California in 1989. Her laboratory in Yale became a major hub for gene-mapping studies during what is known as the age of gene hunters (a term coined by Arthur Kornberg).

In 1989, Francke moved back to California and began working at Stanford University School of Medicine. She held the position of Professor of Pediatrics as well as Professor of Genetics and Investigator of the Howard Hughes Medical Institute. She also worked as Medical Staff at the Stanford University Hospital and the Lucile Salter Packard Children's Hospital.

== Research ==
Francke's research contributed to multiple areas of human genetics, including chromosome identification, gene mapping, positional cloning, and the molecular characterization of inherited disorders. Early in her career, she focused on cytogenetics and used high-resolution chromosome banding to define the physical features of human and mouse chromosomes. This work led to the development of nomenclature systems for banding patterns in both species. She assigned individual genes to these maps using chromosomal rearrangements and somatic cell hybrid panels. Later, she confirmed and more precisely sub-mapped genes by in situ hybridization of gene fragments to chromosomes.

Francke's research combined high-resolution chromosomal mapping and molecular genetics to link specific genomic intervals to disease phenotypes and candidate genes. Her positional approach, common before whole-genome sequencing, identified disease loci such as Duchenne muscular dystrophy, chronic granulomatous disease, Charcot–Marie–Tooth disease, and Laron syndrome, as detailed in her 2012 William Allan Award address.

Francke clarified the role of imprinted genes on chromosome 15 in Prader-Willi syndrome. In 1992, her group mapped the SNRPN gene to the human 15q12 region and showed its mouse counterpart is maternally imprinted, implicating loss of paternal SNRPN expression in the disease. Building on this work, her lab later identified additional imprinted transcripts in the region, such as SNORD116 and its mouse counterpart.

In 1994, her lab used positional cloning to identify the gene for Wiskott–Aldrich syndrome (WAS), an X-linked immunodeficiency characterized by thrombocytopenia and eczema. Subsequent collaborations clarified the role of the previously unknown WASP protein and the mutations found in patients with WAS.

In addition, her laboratory mapped and characterized genes in regions deleted in the neurodevelopmental disorder Williams syndrome, including the GTF2I gene, located within the 7q11.23 common deletion. Initially, her group generated Fzd9 frizzled receptor knockout mice to investigate the role of the Fzd9 gene in lymphoid development and its relevance to the human Williams syndrome deletion, demonstrating phenotypes in these mice that informed understanding of gene function in development. Her group generated mouse models for Williams syndrome that replicate features of the human condition.

Francke's work was central to identifying the genetic basis of Rett syndrome, a severe X-linked neurodevelopmental disorder affecting girls. Using an exclusion mapping strategy in rare families with multiple affected girls, her group narrowed the candidate locus to the X chromosome. Collaborative sequencing then revealed that MECP2 harbored mutations in Rett patients. Her lab subsequently showed that common truncating MECP2 mutations disrupt chromatin structure, causing histone H4 hyperacetylation and implicating altered gene regulation in disease pathogenesis. Global gene expression profiling in Mecp2-deficient mouse cerebellum identified novel downstream targets and pathways dysregulated by MeCP2 deficiency. Her team also mapped cis-regulatory elements controlling MECP2 expression, clarifying its tissue-specific and developmentally regulated transcription.

In the 1990s, Francke and her husband Heinz Furthmayr, then professor of Pathology at Stanford University, collaborated to define the molecular mechanisms underlying Marfan syndrome. Through clinical evaluations combined with DNA, RNA, and protein analyses of fibroblast cultures, they classified patients into distinct subtypes based on quantitative differences in fibrillin-1 biosynthesis and extracellular matrix deposition, with implications for prognosis.

Francke has authored more than 500 peer-reviewed publications addressing gene structure, genomic imprinting, mutation spectra, and functional consequences of genetic variation.

== Awards ==
- Original Member, Highly Cited Researchers database, ISI (2002)
- Antoine Marfan Award, National Marfan Foundation (1996)
- President, International Federation of Human Genetics Societies (2000-2002)
- Elected President, American Society of Human Genetics (1999)
- Elected Member, American Academy of Arts and Sciences (1997)
- Elected Fellow, American Association for the Advancement of Science (1995)
- Elected Member, Institute of Medicine (National Academies) (1990)
- Elected Associate Member, European Molecular Biology Organization (2009)
- Colonel Harland Sanders Lifetime Achievement Award in Genetics, March of Dimes Birth Defects Foundation (2001)
- William Allan Award, American Society for Human Genetics (2012)
- Award for Excellence in Molecular Diagnostics, Association for Molecular Pathology (2014)

== Selected publications ==
- Francke, Uta; Nesbitt, Muriel (2008). "Identification of the mouse chromosomes by quinacrine mustard staining". Cytogenetics. 10 (5): 356–366. doi:10.1159/000130154. PMID 4109887.
- Nesbitt, Muriel N.; Francke, Uta (1973). "A system of nomenclature for band patterns of mouse chromosomes". Chromosoma. 41 (2): 145–158. doi:10.1007/BF00319691. PMID 4120886.
- Francke, U. (1972). "Quinacrine mustard fluorescence of human chromosomes: Characterization of unusual translocations". American Journal of Human Genetics. 24 (2): 189–213. PMC 1762196. PMID 5016511.
- Francke, Uta (2008). "Digitized and differentially shaded human chromosome ideograms for genomic applications". Cytogenetics and Cell Genetics. 65 (3): 206–219. doi:10.1159/000133633. PMID 8222762.
- Jeffreys, Alec J.; Craig, Ian W.; Francke, Uta (1979). "Localisation of the Gγ-, Aγ-, δ- and β-globin genes on the short arm of human chromosome 11". Nature. 281 (5732): 606–608. Bibcode:1979Natur.281..606J. doi:10.1038/281606a0. PMID 492329.
- Francke, U.; Pellegrino, M. A. (1977). "Assignment of the major histocompatibility complex to a region of the short arm of human chromosome 6". Proceedings of the National Academy of Sciences. 74 (3): 1147–1151. Bibcode:1977PNAS...74.1147F. doi:10.1073/pnas.74.3.1147. PMC 430627. PMID 265561.
- Lalley, Peter. A.; Minna, John D.; Francke, UTA (1978). "Conservation of autosomal gene synteny groups in mouse and man". Nature. 274 (5667): 160–163. Bibcode:1978Natur.274..160L. doi:10.1038/274160a0. PMID 662012.
- Francke, U.; Ochs, H. D.; de Martinville, B.; Giacalone, J.; Lindgren, V.; Distèche, C.; Pagon, R. A.; Hofker, M. H.; van Ommen, G. J.; Pearson, P. L. (1985). "Minor Xp21 chromosome deletion in a male associated with expression of Duchenne muscular dystrophy, chronic granulomatous disease, retinitis pigmentosa, and McLeod syndrome". American Journal of Human Genetics. 37 (2): 250–267. PMC 1684578. PMID 4039107.
- Leff, Stuart E.; Brannan, Camilynn I.; Reed, Martha L.; Özçelik, Tayfun; Francke, Uta; Copeland, Neal G.; Jenkins, Nancy A. (1992). "Maternal imprinting of the mouse SNRPN gene and conserved linkage homology with the human Prader–Willi syndrome region". Nature Genetics. 2 (4): 259–264. doi:10.1038/ng1292-259. PMID 1303276.
