= RGS2 =

Protein-coding gene in humans

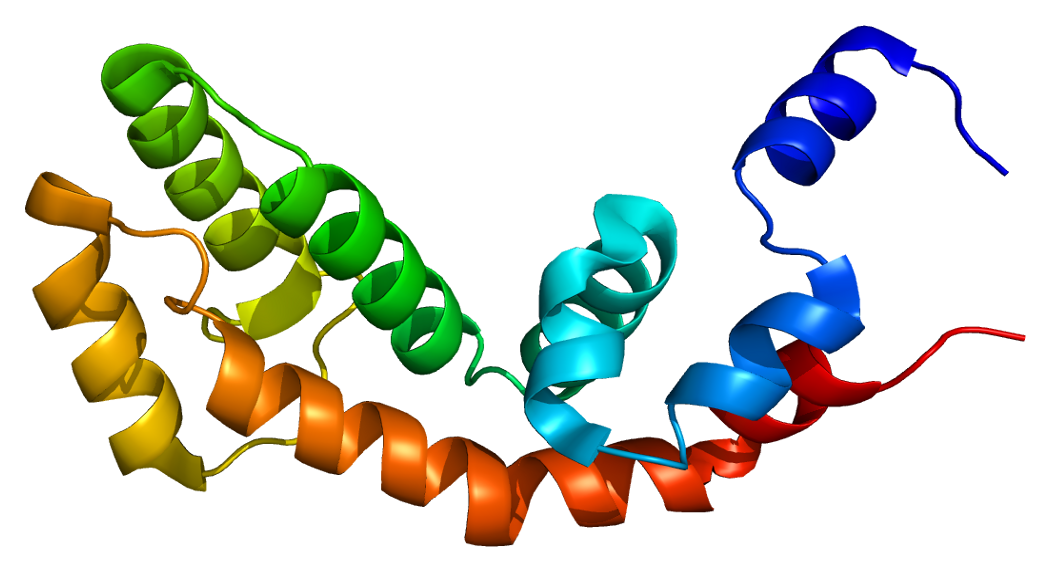

Identifiers
- Aliases: RGS2, G0S8, regulator of G-protein signaling 2, regulator of G protein signaling 2
- External IDs: OMIM: 600861; MGI: 1098271; GeneCards: RGS2
Available structures
PDB	Ortholog search: PDBe RCSB
PDB	List of PDB id codes 2AF0, 2V4Z, 4EKC, 4EKD

Gene location (Human)
Chr.	Chromosome 1 (human)
Band	1q31.2	Start	192,809,039 bp
Band	1q31.2	End	192,812,275 bp

Gene location (Mouse)
Chr.	Chromosome 1 (mouse)
Band	1 F|1 62.56 cM	Start	143,875,076 bp
Band	1 F|1 62.56 cM	End	143,879,899 bp
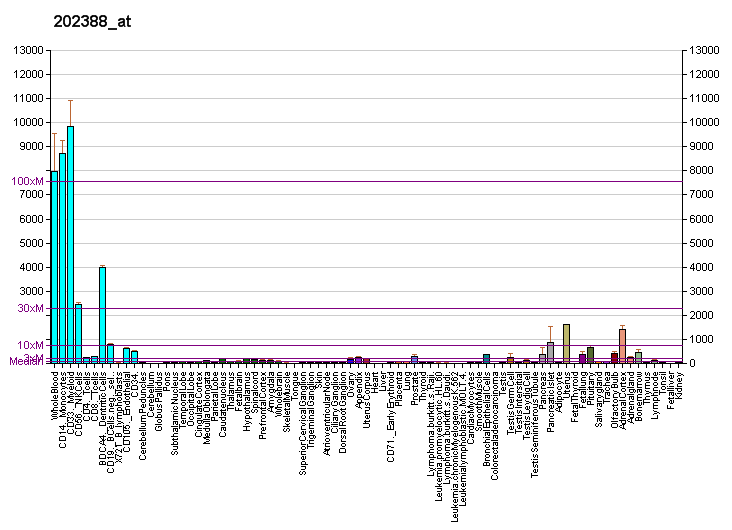
RNA expression pattern
Bgee	Human / Mouse (ortholog); Top expressed in: secondary oocyte; periodontal fiber; monocyte; tail of epididymis; gastric mucosa; granulocyte; seminal vesicula; mucosa of urinary bladder; bone marrow; jejunal mucosa / Top expressed in: cumulus cell; gastrula; zygote; secondary oocyte; primary oocyte; median eminence; left lung lobe; dorsal striatum; nucleus accumbens; lobe of prostate; More reference expression data
BioGPS	More reference expression data
Gene ontology
Molecular function	GTPase activator activity; calmodulin binding; protein binding; G-protein alpha-subunit binding; beta-tubulin binding; GTPase activity
Cellular component	membrane; nucleolus; mitochondrion; neuron projection; cytoplasmic side of plasma membrane; nucleus; cytoplasm; plasma membrane; cytosol
Biological process	negative regulation of cAMP-mediated signaling; regulation of G protein-coupled receptor signaling pathway; negative regulation of cardiac muscle hypertrophy; positive regulation of GTPase activity; negative regulation of MAP kinase activity; positive regulation of cardiac muscle contraction; spermatogenesis; brown fat cell differentiation; positive regulation of microtubule polymerization; relaxation of vascular associated smooth muscle; cell cycle; negative regulation of signal transduction; negative regulation of G protein-coupled receptor signaling pathway; relaxation of cardiac muscle; regulation of translation; negative regulation of phospholipase activity; negative regulation of adenylate cyclase-inhibiting adrenergic receptor signaling pathway involved in heart process; response to amphetamine; brain development; positive regulation of neuron projection development; negative regulation of translation; ovulation; response to ethanol; maternal process involved in female pregnancy; negative regulation of cell growth involved in cardiac muscle cell development; negative regulation of glycine import across plasma membrane; G protein-coupled receptor signaling pathway
Sources:Amigo / QuickGO
Orthologs
Databases	NCBI: entry; OMA: entry
Species	Human	Mouse
Entrez	5997	19735
Ensembl	ENSG00000116741	ENSMUSG00000026360
UniProt	P41220	O08849
RefSeq (mRNA)	NM_002923	NM_009061
RefSeq (protein)	NP_002914; NP_002914.1	NP_033087
Location (UCSC)	Chr 1: 192.81 – 192.81 Mb	Chr 1: 143.88 – 143.88 Mb
PubMed search
- Wikidata
View/Edit Human	View/Edit Mouse

Regulator of G-protein signaling 2 is a protein that in humans is encoded by the RGS2 gene. It is part of a larger family of RGS proteins that control signalling through G-protein coupled receptors (GPCR).

== Function ==
RGS2 is thought to have protective effects against myocardial hypertrophy as well as atrial arrhythmias. Increased stimulation of Gs coupled β1-adrenergic receptors and Gq coupled α1-adrenergic receptors in the heart can result in cardiac hypertrophy. In the case of Gq protein coupled receptor (GqPCR) mediated hypertrophy, Gαq will activate the intracellular affectors phospholipase Cβ and rho guanine nucleotide exchange factor to stimulate cell processes which lead to cardiomyocyte hypertrophy. RGS2 functions as a GTPase Activating Protein (GAP) which acts to increase the natural GTPase activity of the Gα subunit. By increasing the GTPase activity of the Gα subunit, RGS2 promotes GTP hydrolysis back to GDP, thus converting the Gα subunit back to its inactive state and reducing its signalling ability. Both GsPCR and GqPCR activation can contribute to cardiac hypertrophy via activation of MAP Kinases as well. RGS2 has been shown to decrease phosphorylation of those MAP kinases and therefore decrease their activation in response to Gαs signalling.

In the case of GsPCR mediated hypertrophy, the main mechanism by which signalling contributes to hypertrophy is through the Gβγ subunit; Gαs signalling by itself is not sufficient. Nevertheless, RGS2 has been shown to inhibit Gs mediated hypertrophy. The mechanism of how RGS2 regulates increased Gβγ signalling is not well understood, apart from the fact that it is unrelated to RGS2's GAP function. A deficiency in RGS2 has been linked with increased cardiac hypertrophy in mice. RGS2 deficient hearts appear normal until confronted with an increased workload, to which they respond readily with increased Gαq signalling and hypertrophy.

Gαs subunits increase adenyl cyclase activity, which in turn leads to cAMP accumulation in the myocyte nucleus to trigger hypertrophy. RGS2 regulates the effects of increased Gαs signalling through its GAP function. Stimulation of GsPCRs not only leads to hypertrophy but it has also been shown to selectively induce higher expression levels of RGS2 which in turn, protects against hypertrophy, providing a mechanism for maintaining homeostatic conditions.

There has also been some evidence of a role of RGS2 in atrial arrhythmias where RGS2 deficient mice exhibited prolonged and greater susceptibility to electrically induced atrial fibrillation. This was attributed to a decrease in RGS2's inhibitory effects on Gq coupled M3 muscarinic receptor signalling, resulting in increased Gαq activity. The M3 muscarinic receptor normally activates delayed rectifier potassium channels in the atria, thus increased Gαq activity is thought to result in an altered potassium flux, a decreased refractory period, increased chance of current re-entry and inappropriate contraction.

== Interactions ==
RGS2 has been shown to interact with PRKG1 and ADCY5.
