= Transcription factor II I =

Protein-coding gene in humans

GTF2I
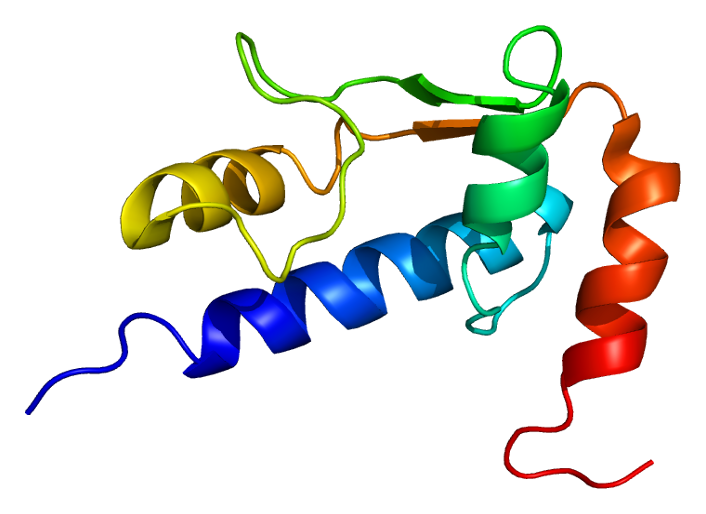

Identifiers
- Aliases: GTF2I, BAP135, BTKAP1, DIWS, GTFII-I, IB291, SPIN, TFII-I, WBS, WBSCR6, general transcription factor IIi
- External IDs: OMIM: 601679; MGI: 1202722; GeneCards: GTF2I
Available structures
PDB	Ortholog search: PDBe RCSB
PDB	List of PDB id codes 2D9B, 2DN4, 2ED2, 2EJE

Gene location (Human)
Chr.	Chromosome 7 (human)
Band	7q11.23	Start	74,650,231 bp
Band	7q11.23	End	74,760,692 bp

Gene location (Mouse)
Chr.	Chromosome 5 (mouse)
Band	5 G2|5 74.48 cM	Start	134,237,834 bp
Band	5 G2|5 74.48 cM	End	134,314,760 bp
RNA expression pattern
Bgee	Human / Mouse (ortholog); Top expressed in: ganglionic eminence; epithelium of colon; sural nerve; ventricular zone; right uterine tube; right adrenal cortex; right lobe of thyroid gland; left lobe of thyroid gland; right ovary; body of pancreas / Top expressed in: utricle; spermatocyte; molar; primitive streak; vestibular sensory epithelium; superior surface of tongue; medullary collecting duct; renal corpuscle; retinal pigment epithelium; ciliary body; More reference expression data
BioGPS	n/a
Gene ontology
Molecular function	protein binding; mitogen-activated protein kinase binding; DNA-binding transcription factor activity, RNA polymerase II-specific; DNA binding; DNA-binding transcription factor activity
Cellular component	soma; cell projection; membrane; nucleus; cytoplasm; nucleoplasm
Biological process	negative regulation of angiogenesis; transcription, DNA-templated; transcription initiation from RNA polymerase II promoter; regulation of transcription, DNA-templated; signal transduction; negative regulation of cytosolic calcium ion concentration; transition between slow and fast fiber; regulation of transcription by RNA polymerase II; transcription by RNA polymerase II
Sources:Amigo / QuickGO
Orthologs
Databases	NCBI: entry; OMA: entry
Species	Human	Mouse
Entrez	2969	14886
Ensembl	ENSG00000263001	ENSMUSG00000060261
UniProt	P78347	Q9ESZ8
RefSeq (mRNA)	NM_001163636; NM_001280800; NM_001518; NM_032999; NM_033000 NM_033001	NM_001080746; NM_001080747; NM_001080748; NM_001080749; NM_010365 NM_001359062; NM_001359063; NM_001359064; NM_001359065; NM_001359066; NM_001359067
RefSeq (protein)	NP_001157108; NP_001267729; NP_001509; NP_127492; NP_127493 NP_127494	NP_001074215; NP_001074216; NP_001074217; NP_001074218; NP_034495 NP_001345991; NP_001345992; NP_001345993; NP_001345994; NP_001345995; NP_001345996
Location (UCSC)	Chr 7: 74.65 – 74.76 Mb	Chr 5: 134.24 – 134.31 Mb
PubMed search
- Wikidata
View/Edit Human	View/Edit Mouse

General transcription factor II-I is a protein that in humans is encoded by the GTF2I gene.

== Function ==
This gene encodes a multifunctional phosphoprotein, TFII-I, with roles in transcription and signal transduction. Haploinsuffiency (deletion of one copy) of the GTF2I gene is noted in Williams-Beuren syndrome, a multisystem developmental disorder caused by the deletion of contiguous genes at chromosome 7q11.23. It is duplicated in the 7q11.23 duplication syndrome. The exon(s) encoding 5' UTR has not been fully defined, but this gene is known to contain at least 34 exons, and its alternative splicing generates 4 transcript variants in humans. A single gain-of-function point mutation in GTF2I is also found in certain Thymomas. Single nucleotide polymorphism (SNP) in GTF2I is correlated to autoimmune disorders.

== Interactions ==
GTF2I has been shown to interact with:

- Bruton's tyrosine kinase,
- HDAC3,
- Histone deacetylase 2,
- MAPK3,
- Myc,
- PRKG1,
- Serum response factor and
- USF1 (human gene).
