= CGMP-dependent protein kinase =

Protein kinase

protein kinase, cGMP-dependent, type I
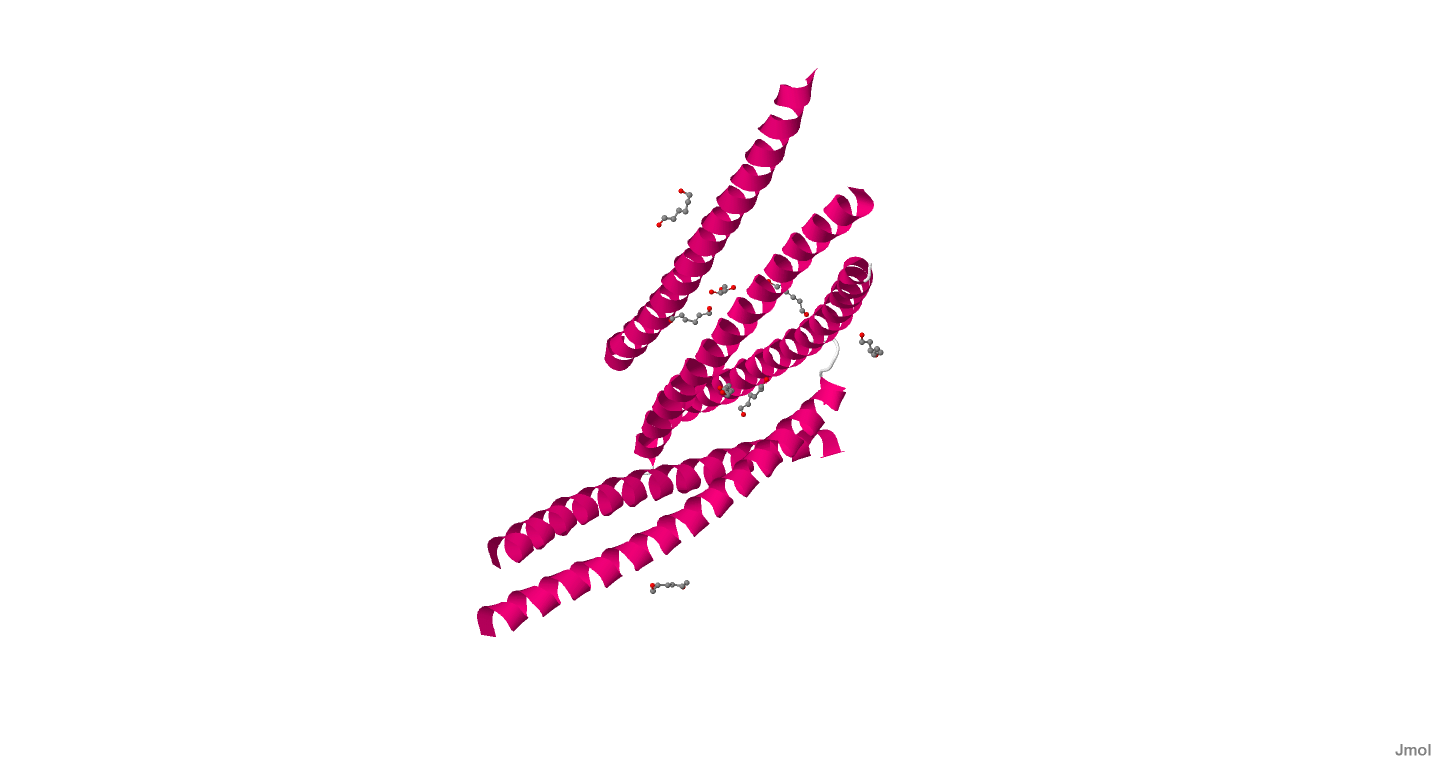
- Crystallographic structure of the leucine zipper domain of human cGMP dependent protein kinase I beta.

Identifiers
- Symbol: PRKG1
- Alt. symbols: PRKGR1B, PRKG1B
- NCBI gene: 5592
- HGNC: 9414
- OMIM: 176894
- RefSeq: NM_006258
- UniProt: Q13976

Other data
- Locus: Chr. 10 q11.2
Search for
- Structures: Swiss-model
- Domains: InterPro

protein kinase, cGMP-dependent, type II

Identifiers
- Symbol: PRKG2
- NCBI gene: 5593
- HGNC: 9416
- OMIM: 601591
- RefSeq: NM_006259
- UniProt: Q13237

Other data
- Locus: Chr. 4 q13.1-21.1
Search for
- Structures: Swiss-model
- Domains: InterPro

cGMP-dependent protein kinase or protein kinase G (PKG) is a serine/threonine-specific protein kinase that is activated by cGMP. It phosphorylates a number of biologically important targets and is implicated in the regulation of smooth muscle relaxation, platelet function, sperm metabolism, cell division, and nucleic acid synthesis.

== Genes and proteins ==
PKG are serine/threonine kinases that are present in a variety of eukaryotes ranging from the unicellular organism Paramecium to humans. Two PKG genes, coding for PKG type I (PKG-I) and type II (PKG-II), have been identified in mammals. The N-terminus of PKG-I is encoded by two alternatively spliced exons that specify for the PKG-Iα and PKG-Iβ isoforms. PKG-Iβ is activated at ~10-fold higher cGMP concentrations than PKG-Iα. The PKG-I and PKG-II are homodimers of two identical subunits (~75 kDa and ~85 kDa, respectively) and share common structural features.

Each subunit is composed of three functional domains:

- (1) an N-terminal domain that mediates homodimerization, suppression of the kinase activity in the absence of cGMP, and interactions with other proteins including protein substrates
- (2) a regulatory domain that contains two non-identical cGMP-binding sites
- (3) a kinase domain that catalyzes the phosphate transfer from ATP to the hydroxyl group of a serine/threonine side chain of the target protein

Binding of cGMP to the regulatory domain induces a conformational change which stops the inhibition of the catalytic core by the N-terminus and allows the phosphorylation of substrate proteins. Whereas PKG-I is predominantly localized in the cytoplasm, PKG-II is anchored to the plasma membrane by N-terminal myristoylation.

== Tissue distribution ==
In general, PKG-I and PKG-II are expressed in different cell types.

- PKG-I has been detected at high concentrations (above 0.1 μmol/L) in all types of smooth muscle cells (SMCs) including vascular SMCs and in platelets. Lower levels are present in vascular endothelium and cardiomyocytes. The enzyme is also expressed in fibroblasts, certain types of renal cells and leukocytes, and in specific regions of the nervous system, for example in the hippocampus, in cerebellar Purkinje cells, and in dorsal root ganglia. Neurons express either the PKG-Iα or the PKG-Iβ isoform, platelets predominantly Iβ, and both isoforms are present in smooth muscle.
- PKG-II has been detected in renal cells, zona glomerulosa cells of the adrenal cortex, club cells in distal airways, intestinal mucosa, pancreatic ducts, parotid and submandibular glands, chondrocytes, and several brain nuclei, but not in cardiac and vascular myocytes.

Specifically, in smooth muscle tissue, PKG promotes the opening of calcium-activated potassium channels, leading to cell hyperpolarization and relaxation, and blocks agonist activity of phospholipase C, reducing liberation of stored calcium ions by inositol triphosphate.

== Role in cancer ==
Cancerous colon cells stop producing PKG, which apparently limits beta-catenin, thus allowing the VEGF enzyme to solicit angiogenesis.

== Behavioral genetics in Drosophila melanogaster ==
In Drosophila melanogaster the foraging (for) gene is a polymorphic trait that underlies differences in food-seeking behaviors. The for locus is made up of Rover (for^{R}) and Sitter (for^{S}) alleles, with the Rover allele being dominant. Rover individuals typically travel greater distances when foraging for food, while Sitter individuals travel less distance to forage for food. Both Rover and Sitter phenotypes are considered wild-type, as fruit fly populations typically exhibit a 70:30 Rover-to-Sitter ratio. The Rover and Sitter alleles are located within the 24A3-5 region of the Drosophila melanogaster polytene chromosome, a region which contains the PKG d2g gene. PKG expression levels account for differences in for^{R} and for^{S} allele frequency and therefore behavior as Rover individuals show higher PKG expression than Sitter individuals, and the Sitter phenotype can be converted to Rover by over-expression of the dg2 gene.

== See also ==
- cAMP-dependent protein kinase (PKA)
