= ITPR1 =

Protein-coding gene in the species Homo sapiens

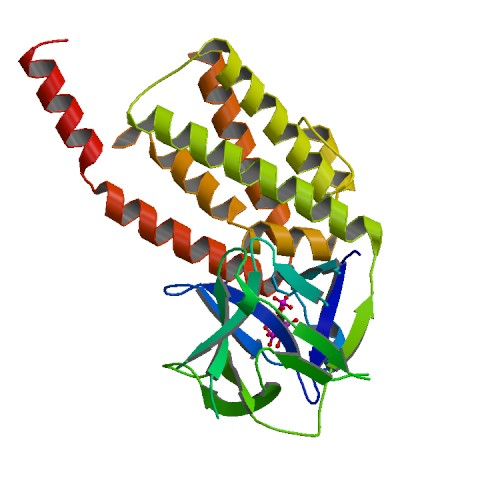

Identifiers
- Aliases: ITPR1, ACV, CLA4, INSP3R1, IP3R, IP3R1, PPP1R94, SCA15, SCA16, SCA29, inositol 1,4,5-trisphosphate receptor type 1
- External IDs: OMIM: 147265; MGI: 96623; GeneCards: ITPR1
Available structures
PDB	Ortholog search: PDBe RCSB
PDB	List of PDB id codes 1N4K, 1XZZ

Gene location (Human)
Chr.	Chromosome 3 (human)
Band	3p26.1	Start	4,493,345 bp
Band	3p26.1	End	4,847,506 bp

Gene location (Mouse)
Chr.	Chromosome 6 (mouse)
Band	6 E1- E2|6 49.74 cM	Start	108,190,057 bp
Band	6 E1- E2|6 49.74 cM	End	108,528,070 bp
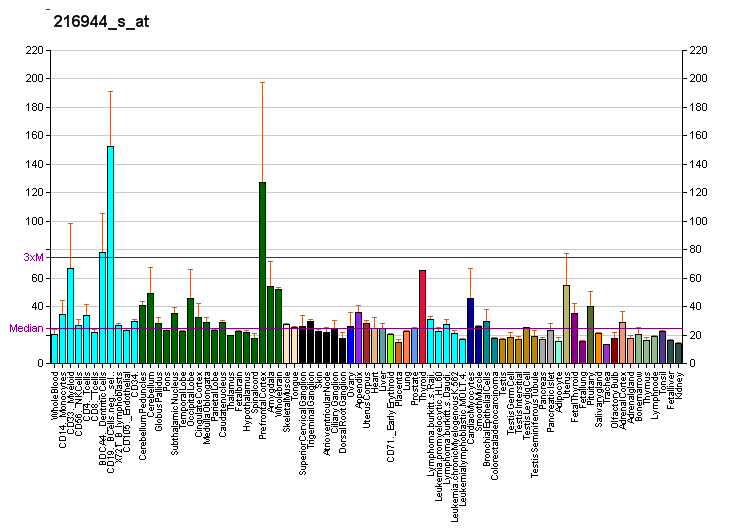

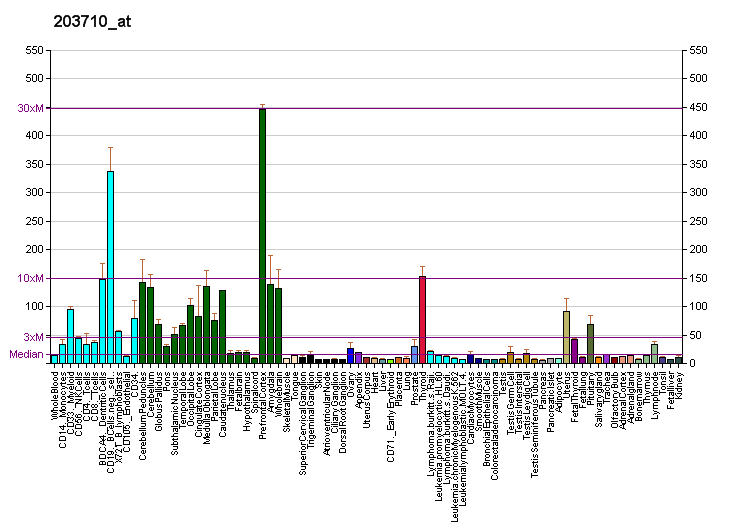

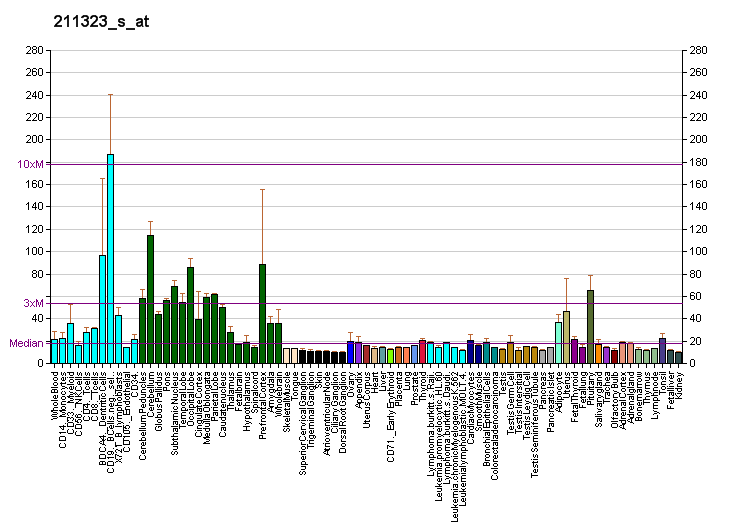
RNA expression pattern
Bgee	Human / Mouse (ortholog); Top expressed in: tail of epididymis; Brodmann area 23; primary visual cortex; right coronary artery; popliteal artery; tibial arteries; seminal vesicula; right hemisphere of cerebellum; orbitofrontal cortex; left coronary artery / Top expressed in: cerebellar vermis; lobe of cerebellum; olfactory tubercle; vestibular membrane of cochlear duct; primary motor cortex; Epithelium of choroid plexus; cingulate gyrus; Region I of hippocampus proper; superior frontal gyrus; choroid plexus of fourth ventricle; More reference expression data
BioGPS	More reference expression data
Gene ontology
Molecular function	calcium channel inhibitor activity; calcium channel activity; inositol 1,4,5-trisphosphate-sensitive calcium-release channel activity; calcium ion transmembrane transporter activity; ion channel activity; protein binding; phosphatidylinositol binding; calcium-release channel activity; calcium ion binding; inositol 1,4,5 trisphosphate binding; inositol 1,4,5-trisphosphate receptor activity involved in regulation of postsynaptic cytosolic calcium levels
Cellular component	cytoplasm; integral component of membrane; platelet dense tubular network; endoplasmic reticulum membrane; membrane; postsynaptic density; nuclear envelope; calcineurin complex; sarcoplasmic reticulum; nuclear inner membrane; platelet dense granule membrane; nucleolus; platelet dense tubular network membrane; plasma membrane; transport vesicle membrane; cytoplasmic vesicle; perinuclear region of cytoplasm; endoplasmic reticulum; cytoplasmic vesicle membrane; secretory granule membrane; protein-containing complex; Schaffer collateral - CA1 synapse
Biological process	release of sequestered calcium ion into cytosol; regulation of cardiac conduction; response to hypoxia; voluntary musculoskeletal movement; regulation of insulin secretion; epithelial fluid transport; ion transport; post-embryonic development; endoplasmic reticulum calcium ion homeostasis; platelet activation; intrinsic apoptotic signaling pathway in response to endoplasmic reticulum stress; regulation of autophagy; transmembrane transport; calcium ion transmembrane transport; negative regulation of calcium-mediated signaling; inositol phosphate-mediated signaling; calcium ion transport; apoptotic process; signal transduction; regulation of molecular function; transport; regulation of postsynaptic cytosolic calcium ion concentration
Sources:Amigo / QuickGO
Orthologs
Databases	NCBI: entry; OMA: entry
Species	Human	Mouse
Entrez	3708	16438
Ensembl	ENSG00000150995	ENSMUSG00000030102
UniProt	Q14643	P11881
RefSeq (mRNA)	NM_001099952; NM_001168272; NM_002222; NM_001378452	NM_010585
RefSeq (protein)	NP_001093422; NP_001161744; NP_002213	NP_034715
Location (UCSC)	Chr 3: 4.49 – 4.85 Mb	Chr 6: 108.19 – 108.53 Mb
PubMed search
- Wikidata
View/Edit Human	View/Edit Mouse

Inositol 1,4,5-trisphosphate receptor type 1 is a protein that in humans is encoded by the ITPR1 gene.

== Interactions ==
ITPR1 has been shown to interact with:

- AHCYL1,
- CA8,
- EPB41L1
- FKBP1A,
- MRVI1,
- PRKG1,
- RHOA, and
- TRPC4.
- CASPR2,

== See also ==
- Inositol triphosphate
- Inositol triphosphate receptor
