= IRAG1 =

Protein-coding gene in humans

Identifiers
- Aliases: IRAG1, IRAG, JAW1L, murine retrovirus integration site 1 homolog, MRVI1, inositol 1,4,5-triphosphate receptor associated 1
- External IDs: OMIM: 604673; MGI: 1338023; GeneCards: IRAG1

Gene location (Human)
Chr.	Chromosome 11 (human)
Band	11p15.4	Start	10,573,091 bp
Band	11p15.4	End	10,693,988 bp

Gene location (Mouse)
Chr.	Chromosome 7 (mouse)
Band	7 E3|7 57.9 cM	Start	110,467,473 bp
Band	7 E3|7 57.9 cM	End	110,581,668 bp
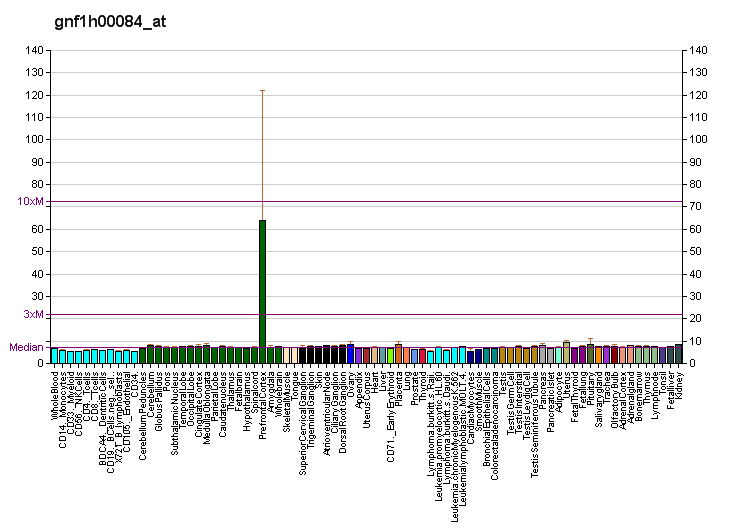
RNA expression pattern
Bgee	Human / Mouse (ortholog); Top expressed in: saphenous vein; urethra; right coronary artery; ascending aorta; vena cava; popliteal artery; tibial arteries; Descending thoracic aorta; external globus pallidus; cardia / Top expressed in: ascending aorta; iris; aortic valve; uterus; vas deferens; tunica media of zone of aorta; blood; Paneth cell; conjunctival fornix; cervix; More reference expression data
BioGPS	More reference expression data
Gene ontology
Molecular function	protein binding
Cellular component	cytoplasm; perinuclear region of cytoplasm; integral component of membrane; platelet dense tubular network membrane; endoplasmic reticulum membrane; membrane; sarcoplasmic reticulum
Biological process	blood coagulation
Sources:Amigo / QuickGO
Orthologs
Databases	NCBI: entry; OMA: entry
Species	Human	Mouse
Entrez	10335	17540
Ensembl	ENSG00000072952	ENSMUSG00000005611
UniProt	Q9Y6F6	Q9WUX5
RefSeq (mRNA)	NM_130385; NM_001098579; NM_001100163; NM_001100167; NM_001206880 NM_001206881	NM_010826; NM_194464
RefSeq (protein)	NP_001092049; NP_001093633; NP_001093637; NP_001193809; NP_001193810 NP_569056	NP_034956; NP_919446
Location (UCSC)	Chr 11: 10.57 – 10.69 Mb	Chr 7: 110.47 – 110.58 Mb
PubMed search
- Wikidata
View/Edit Human	View/Edit Mouse

Inositol 1,4,5-triphosphate receptor associated 1 is a protein that in humans is encoded by the IRAG1 gene (previously MRVI1).

== Function ==
This gene is similar to a mouse putative tumor suppressor gene that is frequently disrupted by mouse AIDS-related virus (MRV). The encoded protein, which is found in the membrane of the endoplasmic reticulum, is similar to Jaw1, a lymphoid-restricted protein whose expression is downregulated during myeloid differentiation. Therefore, this gene may be a myeloid leukemia tumor suppressor gene. Several alternatively spliced transcripts have been found for this gene, however, the full-length nature of some variants has not been determined. Of the two characterized variants which encode different isoforms, one initiates translation at a non-AUG start site.

== Interactions ==
MRVI1 has been shown to interact with ITPR1 and PRKG1.
