= Troponin T, slow skeletal muscle =

Protein-coding gene in the species Homo sapiens

TNNT1

Identifiers
- Aliases: TNNT1, ANM, NEM5, STNT, TNT, TNTS, troponin T1, slow skeletal type
- External IDs: OMIM: 191041; MGI: 1333868; GeneCards: TNNT1

Gene location (Human)
Chr.	Chromosome 19 (human)
Band	19q13.42	Start	55,132,698 bp
Band	19q13.42	End	55,149,206 bp

Gene location (Mouse)
Chr.	Chromosome 7 (mouse)
Band	7 A1|7 2.6 cM	Start	4,507,569 bp
Band	7 A1|7 2.6 cM	End	4,519,381 bp
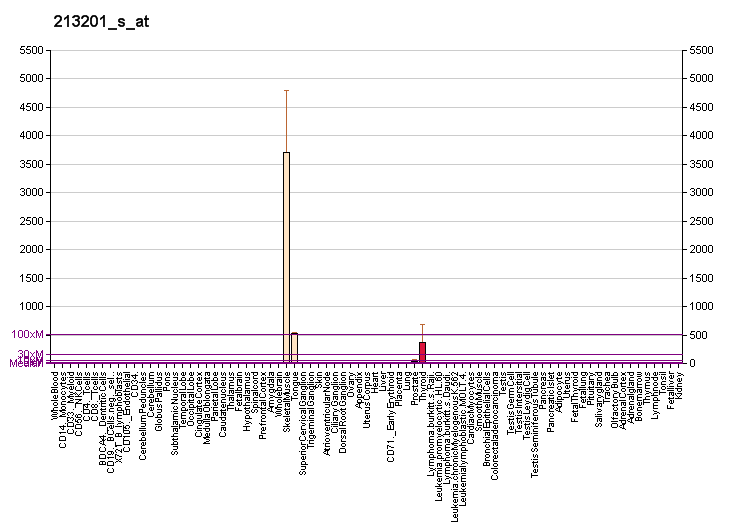
RNA expression pattern
Bgee	Human / Mouse (ortholog); Top expressed in: glutes; Skeletal muscle tissue of biceps brachii; thoracic diaphragm; triceps brachii muscle; gastrocnemius muscle; Skeletal muscle tissue of rectus abdominis; muscle of thigh; vastus lateralis muscle; deltoid muscle; tibialis anterior muscle / Top expressed in: soleus muscle; plantaris muscle; ankle; thoracic diaphragm; medial geniculate nucleus; extraocular muscle; intercostal muscle; lateral geniculate nucleus; internal carotid artery; human fetus; More reference expression data
BioGPS	More reference expression data
Gene ontology
Molecular function	troponin T binding; tropomyosin binding; protein binding; calcium ion binding; calcium-dependent ATPase activity
Cellular component	cytosol; troponin complex
Biological process	regulation of muscle contraction; skeletal muscle contraction; slow-twitch skeletal muscle fiber contraction; negative regulation of muscle contraction; transition between fast and slow fiber; muscle filament sliding; muscle contraction; sarcomere organization; cardiac muscle contraction
Sources:Amigo / QuickGO
Orthologs
Databases	NCBI: entry; OMA: entry
Species	Human	Mouse
Entrez	7138	21955
Ensembl	ENSG00000105048	ENSMUSG00000064179
UniProt	P13805; Q3B759	O88346
RefSeq (mRNA)	NM_001126132; NM_001126133; NM_001291774; NM_003283	NM_001277903; NM_001277904; NM_011618; NM_001360154
RefSeq (protein)	NP_001119604; NP_001119605; NP_001278703; NP_003274	NP_001264832; NP_001264833; NP_035748; NP_001347083
Location (UCSC)	Chr 19: 55.13 – 55.15 Mb	Chr 7: 4.51 – 4.52 Mb
PubMed search
- Wikidata
View/Edit Human	View/Edit Mouse

Troponin T, slow skeletal muscle (TnTs) is a protein that in humans is encoded by the TNNT1 gene.

The TNNT1 gene is located at 19q13.4 in the human chromosomal genome, encoding the slow twitch skeletal muscle isoform of troponin T (ssTnT). ssTnT is an ~32-kDa protein consisting of 262 amino acids (including the first methionine) with an isoelectric point (pI) of 5.95. It is the tropomyosin binding and thin filament anchoring subunit of the troponin complex in the sarcomeres of slow twitch skeletal muscle fibers. TNNT1 gene is specifically expressed in slow skeletal muscle of vertebrates, with one exception that dry land toad (Bufo) cardiac muscle expresses ssTnT other than cardiac TnT.

== Evolution ==
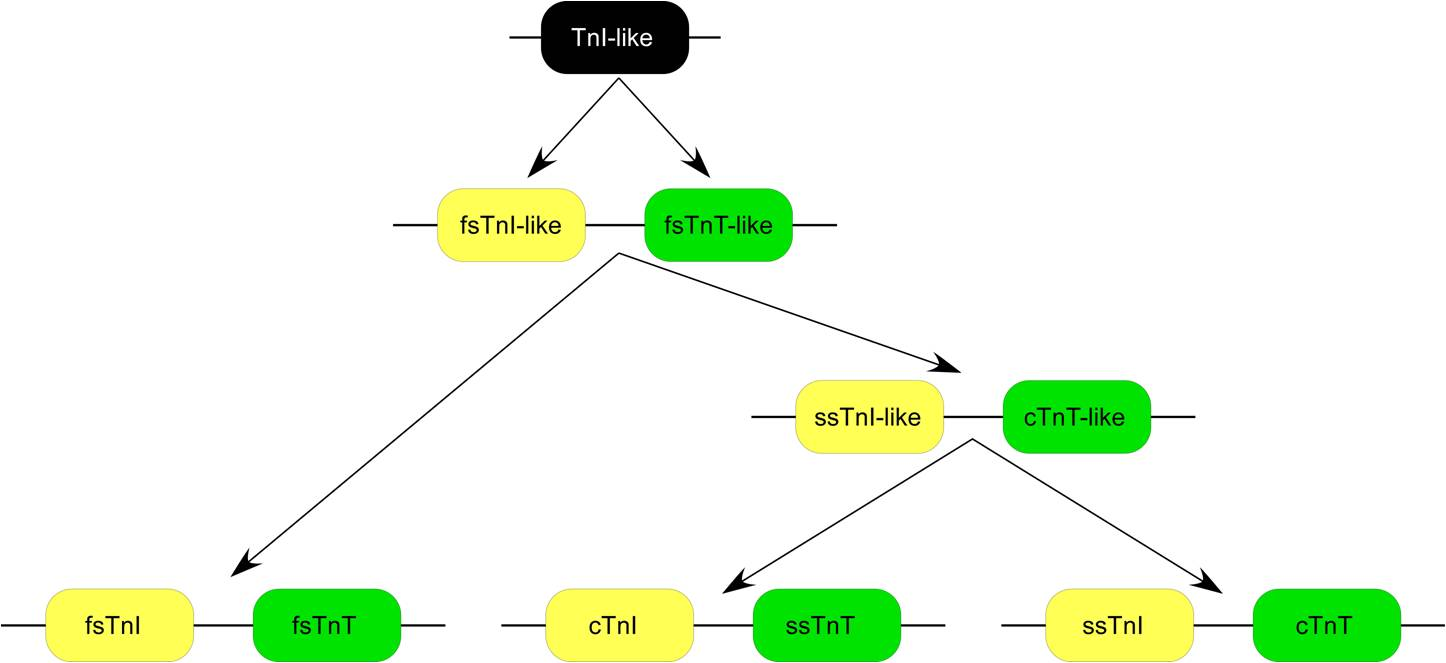

Three homologous genes have evolved in vertebrates, encoding three muscle type specific isoforms of TnT. Each of the TnT isoform genes is linked to one of the three troponin I isoform genes encoding the inhibitory subunit of the troponin complex, in chromosomal DNA to form three gene pairs: The fast skeletal muscle TnI (fsTnI)-fsTnT, ssTnI-cardiac (cTnT) and cTnI-ssTnT gene pairs. Sequence and epitope conservation studies suggested that genes encoding the muscle type specific TnT and TnI isoforms may have evolved from duplications of a fsTnI-like-fsTnT-like gene pair. Evolutionary lineage of the three TnI-TnT gene pairs shows that cTnI-ssTnT is the newest and most closely linked.

Protein sequence alignment demonstrated that TNNT1 genes are highly conserved among vertebrate species (Fig. 2), especially in the middle and C-terminal regions, while the three muscle type isoforms are significantly diverged among vertebrate species.

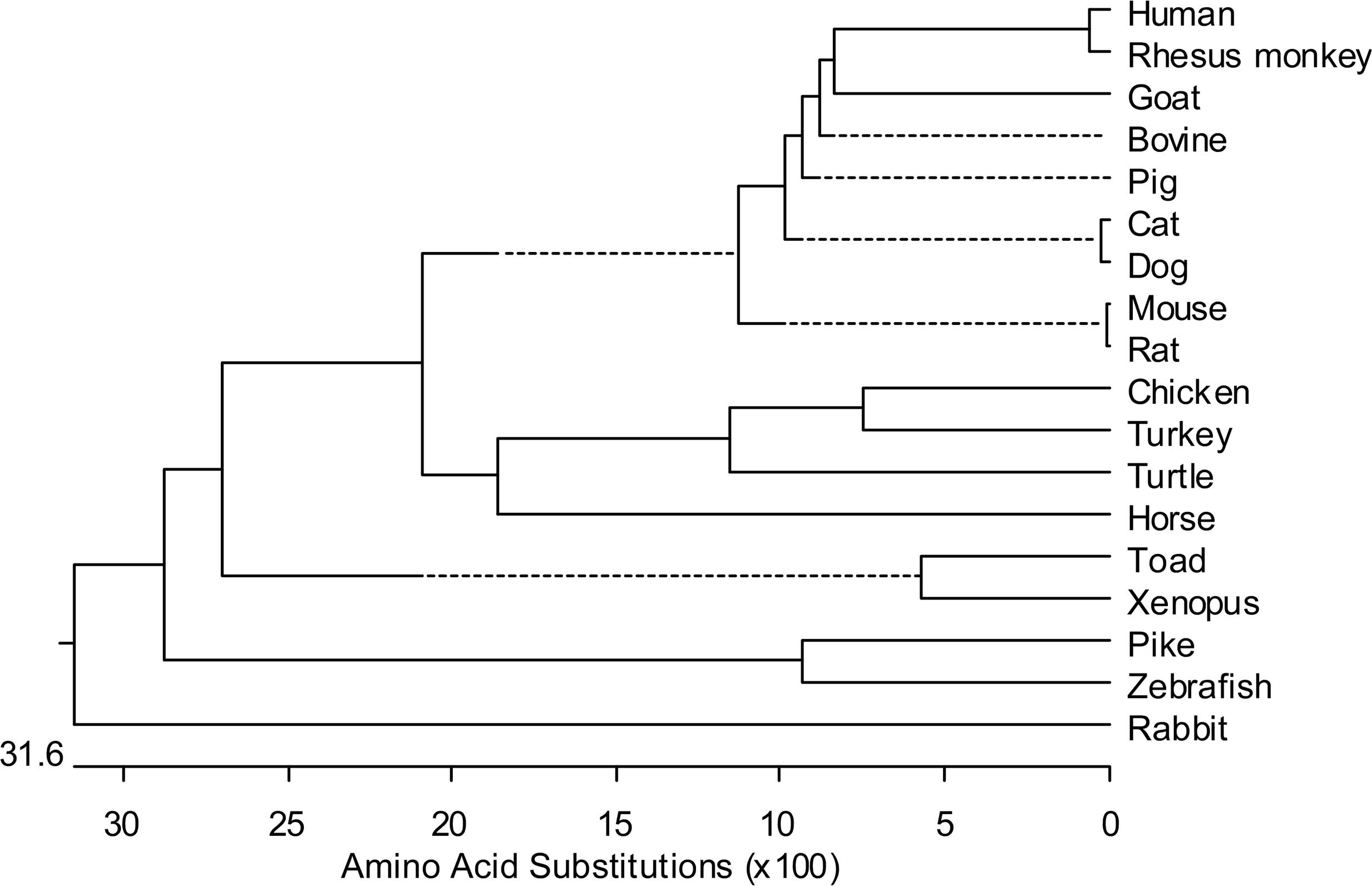

== Alternative splicing ==
In mammalian and avian species, TNNT1 gene has a total of 14 exons, among which exon 5 encoding an 11-amino acid in the N-terminal region is alternatively spliced, generating a high molecular weight and a low molecular weight slow TnT splice forms (Jin, Chen et al. 1998). Biochemical studies showed that TnT splice forms have detectable different molecular conformation in the middle and C-terminal regions, producing different binding affinities for TnI and tropomyosin. The alternative splice forms of ssTnT play a role in skeletal muscle adaptation in physiologic and pathological conditions. Alternative splicing at alternative acceptor sites of intron 5 generates a single amino acid difference in the N-terminal region of ssTnT, of which functional significance has not been established.

== Clinical significance ==
A nonsense mutation E180X in the exon 11 of TNNT1 gene causes Amish Nemaline Myopathy (ANM), which is a severe form of recessive nemaline myopathy originally found in the Old Order Amish population in Pennsylvania, USA. Truncation of the ssTnT polypeptide chain by the E180X mutation deletes the tropomyosin-binding site 2 as well as the binding sites for TnI and troponin C (TnC) in the C-terminal region (Fig. 3). Consistent with the recessive phenotype, the truncated ssTnT is incapable of incorporation into the myofilaments and completely degraded in muscle cells.

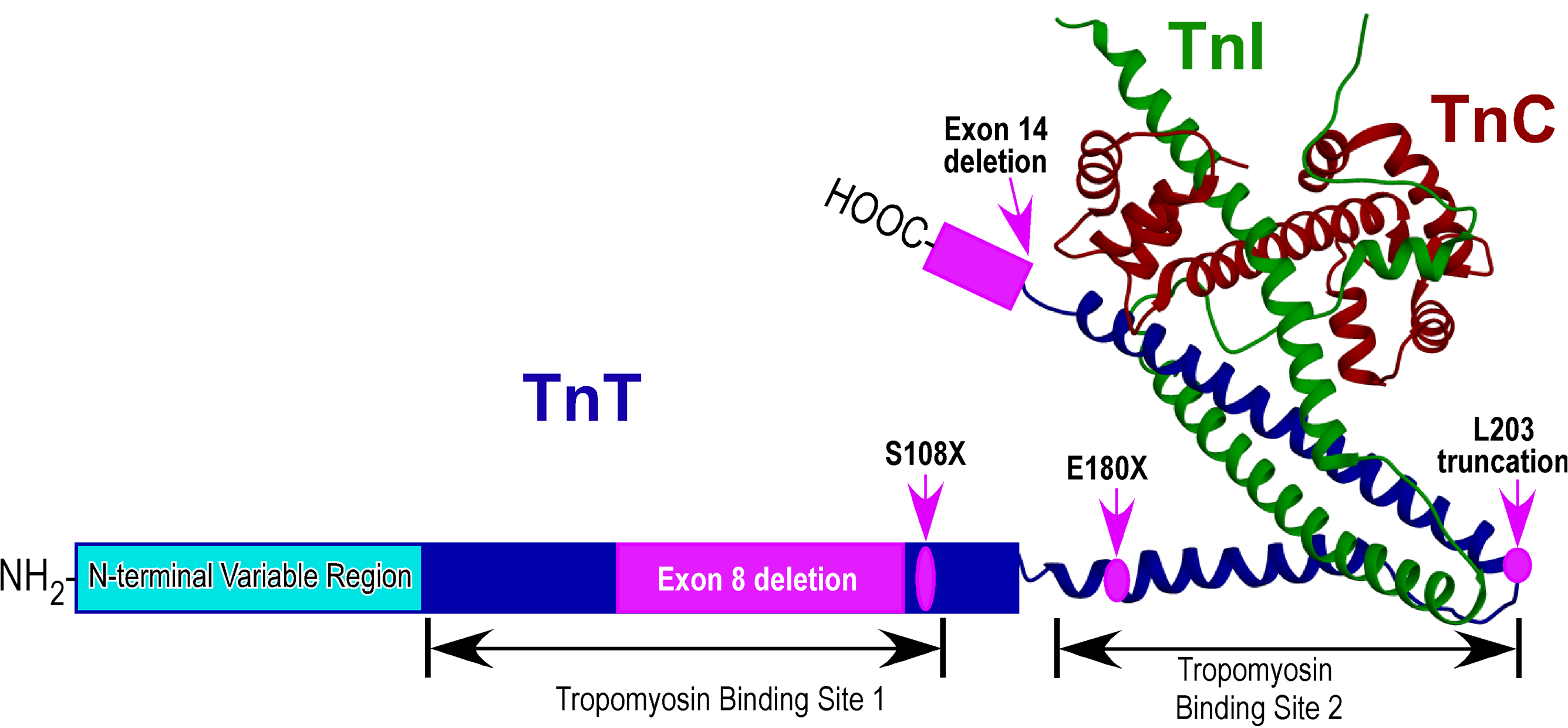

Tnnt1 gene targeted mouse studies reproduced the myopathic phenotypes of ANM. ssTnT null mice showed significantly decreased type I slow fibers in diaphragm and soleus muscles with hypertrophy of type II fast fibers, increased fatigability, and active regeneration of slow fibers (Wei, Lu et al. 2014).

Recent case reports identified three more mutations in TNNT1 gene to cause nemaline myopathies outside the Amish population. A nonsense mutation S108X in exon 9 was identified in a Hispanic male patient with severe recessive nemaline myopathy phenotype. A Dutch patient with compound heterozygous TNNT1 gene mutations that cause exon 8 and exon 14 deletions also presents nemaline myopathy phenotypes. A rearrangement in TNNT1 gene (c.574_577 delins TAGTGCTGT) leading to aberrant splicing that causes C-terminal truncation of the protein (L203 truncation) was reported in 9 Palestinian patients from 7 unrelated families with recessively inherited nemaline Myopathy.

Illustrated in Fig. 3, the S108X mutation truncates ssTnT protein to cause a loss of functional structures equivalent to that of E180X. The exon 8 deletion destructs the middle region tropomyosin-binding site 1. The L203 truncation deletes the binding sites for TnI and TnC but preserves both tropomyosin-binding sites 1 and 2. It remains to be investigated whether this novel mutation is able to bind the actin-tropomyosin thin filament in vivo and how it causes recessive nemaline myopathy.

Alternative splicing of exon 5 produces high and low molecular weight splice forms of ssTnT. The low molecular ssTnT was significantly upregulated in type 1 (demyelination) but not type 2 (axon loss) Charcot-Marie-Tooth disease, suggesting that structural modification of TnT in the myofilaments may contribute to adaptation to abnormalities in neuronal activation.

== Interactions ==
TNNT1 has been shown to interact with PRKG1.
