= AHCYL1 =

Protein-coding gene in humans

Identifiers
- Aliases: AHCYL1, DCAL, IRBIT, PPP1R78, PRO0233, XPVKONA, adenosylhomocysteinase like 1
- External IDs: OMIM: 607826; MGI: 2385184; GeneCards: AHCYL1
Available structures
PDB	Ortholog search: PDBe RCSB
PDB	List of PDB id codes 3MTG

Gene location (Human)
Chr.	Chromosome 1 (human)
Band	1p13.3	Start	109,984,765 bp
Band	1p13.3	End	110,023,742 bp

Gene location (Mouse)
Chr.	Chromosome 3 (mouse)
Band	3 F2.3|3 46.83 cM	Start	107,570,434 bp
Band	3 F2.3|3 46.83 cM	End	107,603,876 bp
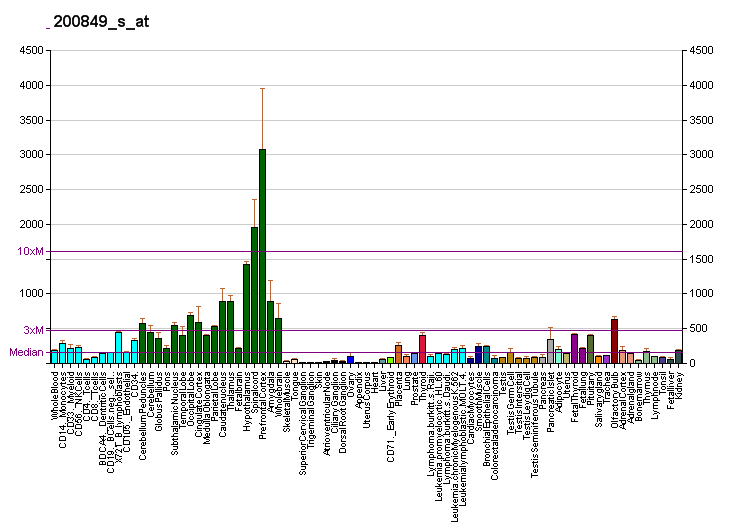

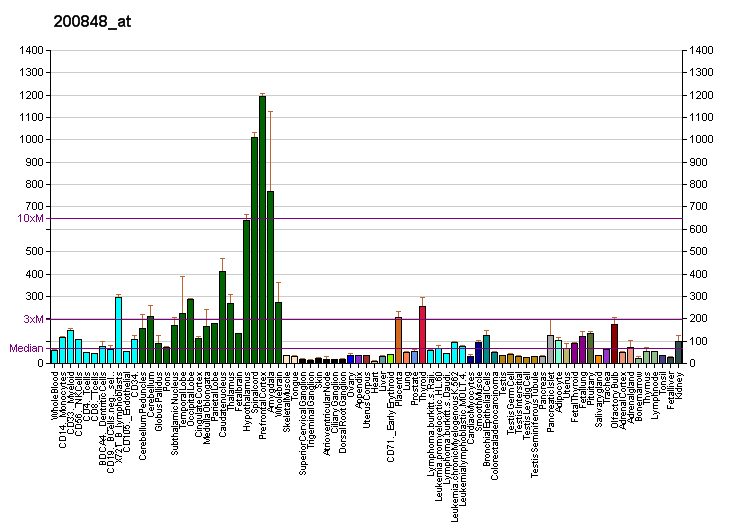

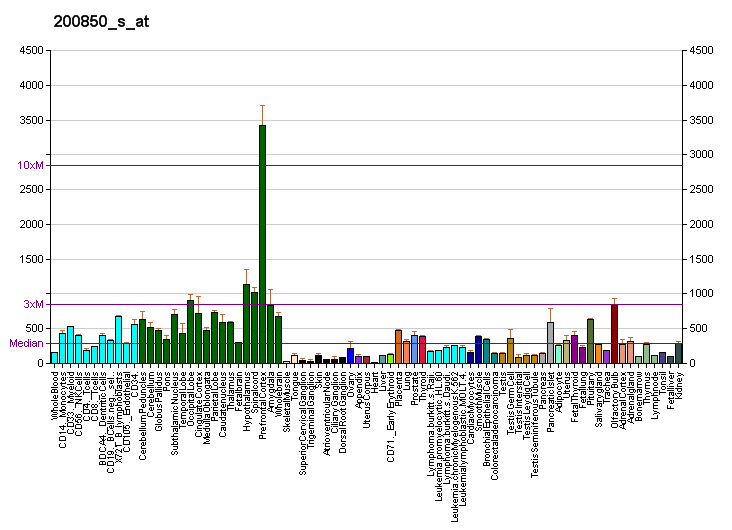
RNA expression pattern
Bgee	Human / Mouse (ortholog); Top expressed in: external globus pallidus; ventral tegmental area; superior vestibular nucleus; dorsal motor nucleus of vagus nerve; pars reticulata; internal globus pallidus; subthalamic nucleus; pars compacta; inferior olivary nucleus; inferior ganglion of vagus nerve / Top expressed in: central gray substance of midbrain; CA3 field; perirhinal cortex; anterior horn of spinal cord; entorhinal cortex; superior colliculus; neural layer of retina; nucleus of stria terminalis; medulla oblongata; inferior colliculi; More reference expression data
BioGPS	More reference expression data
Gene ontology
Molecular function	adenosylhomocysteinase activity; protein binding; RNA binding; identical protein binding
Cellular component	intracellular membrane-bounded organelle; cytosol; extracellular exosome; membrane; endoplasmic reticulum; plasma membrane; cytoplasm; endoplasmic reticulum membrane; apical plasma membrane
Biological process	protein export from nucleus; regulation of ion transmembrane transporter activity; regulation of anion transport; S-adenosylmethionine cycle; response to calcium ion; mRNA polyadenylation; one-carbon metabolic process; regulation of cardiac conduction; positive regulation of sodium ion transport; epithelial fluid transport; regulation of mRNA 3'-end processing; angiotensin-activated signaling pathway
Sources:Amigo / QuickGO
Orthologs
Databases	NCBI: entry; OMA: entry
Species	Human	Mouse
Entrez	10768	229709
Ensembl	ENSG00000168710	ENSMUSG00000027893
UniProt	O43865	Q80SW1
RefSeq (mRNA)	NM_001242673; NM_001242674; NM_001242675; NM_001242676; NM_006621	NM_145542; NM_001357110; NM_001357111; NM_001357112; NM_001357113
RefSeq (protein)	NP_001229602; NP_001229603; NP_001229604; NP_001229605; NP_006612	NP_663517; NP_001344039; NP_001344040; NP_001344041; NP_001344042
Location (UCSC)	Chr 1: 109.98 – 110.02 Mb	Chr 3: 107.57 – 107.6 Mb
PubMed search
- Wikidata
View/Edit Human	View/Edit Mouse

Putative adenosylhomocysteinase 2 is an enzyme that in humans is encoded by the AHCYL1 gene.

== Interactions ==
AHCYL1 has been shown to interact with ITPR1.

== Function ==
The protein encoded by the AHCYL1 gene is also known as IRBIT (IP3 receptor-binding protein released with inositol 1,4,5-trisphosphate). It participates in the regulation of intracellular calcium signaling by interacting with inositol trisphosphate receptors, which control calcium release from the endoplasmic reticulum. A study published in 2006 demonstrated that IRBIT directly binds to these receptors and inhibits both the binding of inositol 1,4,5-trisphosphate (IP3) and the subsequent release of calcium ions. This interaction suggests that AHCYL1 contributes to the regulation of calcium-dependent cellular processes.
