= PRKG1 =

Protein-coding gene in the species Homo sapiens

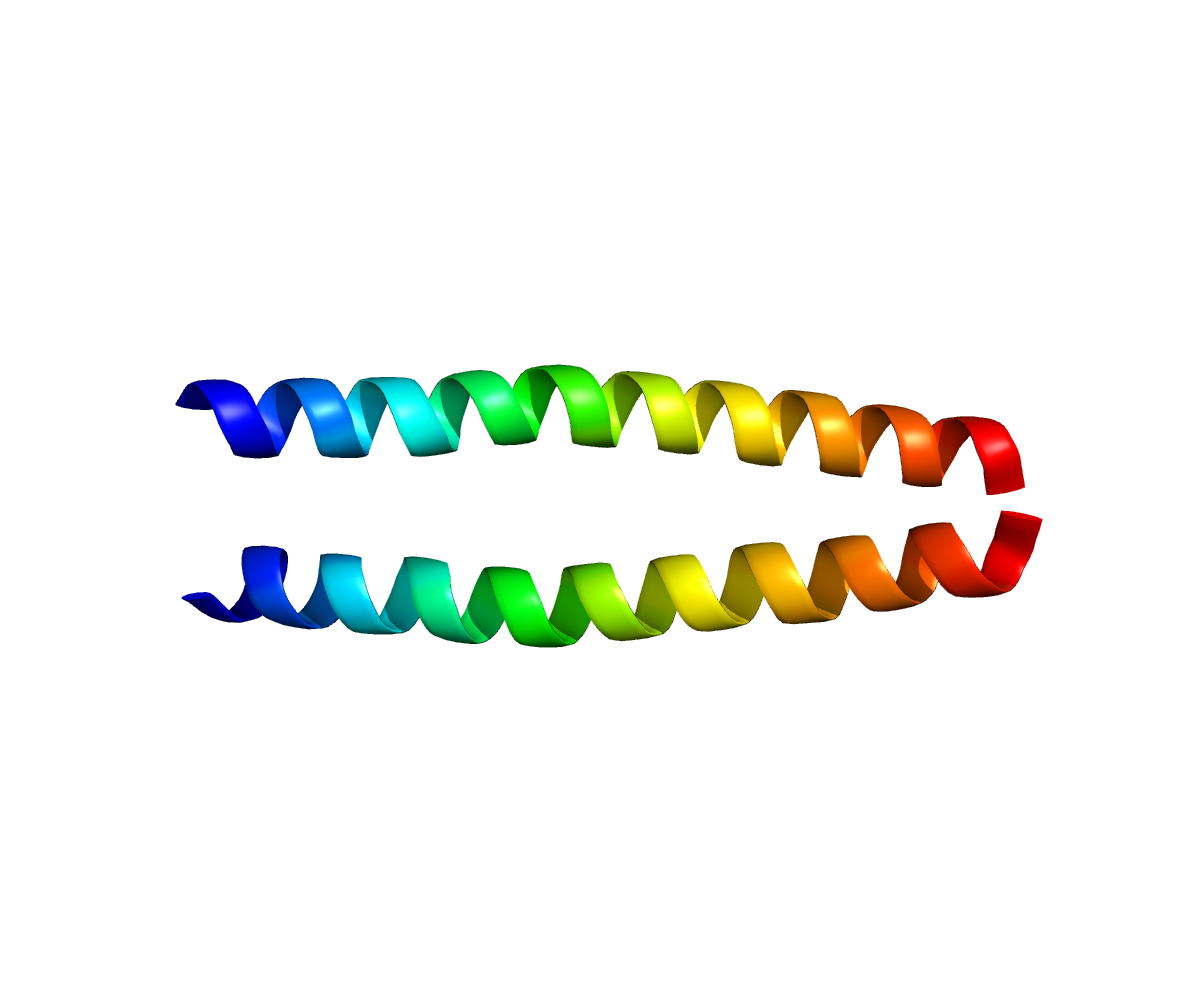

Identifiers
- Aliases: PRKG1, AAT8, PKG, PRKG1B, PRKGR1B, cGK, cGK 1, cGK1, cGKI, cGKI-BETA, cGKI-alpha, protein kinase, cGMP-dependent, type I, PKG1, protein kinase cGMP-dependent 1
- External IDs: OMIM: 176894; MGI: 108174; GeneCards: PRKG1
Available structures
| PDB | Ortholog search: PDBe RCSB |
| PDB | List of PDB id codes 1ZXA, 3OCP, 3OD0, 3OGJ, 4KU7, 4KU8, 4QX5, 4QXK, 4R4L, 4R4M, 4Z07 |
Enzyme activity
| EC # | BRENDA | ExPASy | KEGG | MetaCyc |
|---|---|---|---|---|
| 2.7.11.12 | ↗ | ↗ | ↗ | ↗ |

Gene location (Human)
| Chr. | Chromosome 10 (human) |
| Band | 10q11.23-q21.1 | Start | 50,990,888 bp |
| Band | 10q11.23-q21.1 | End | 52,298,423 bp |

Gene location (Mouse)
| Chr. | Chromosome 19 (mouse) |
| Band | 19|19 C1 | Start | 30,541,889 bp |
| Band | 19|19 C1 | End | 31,742,433 bp |
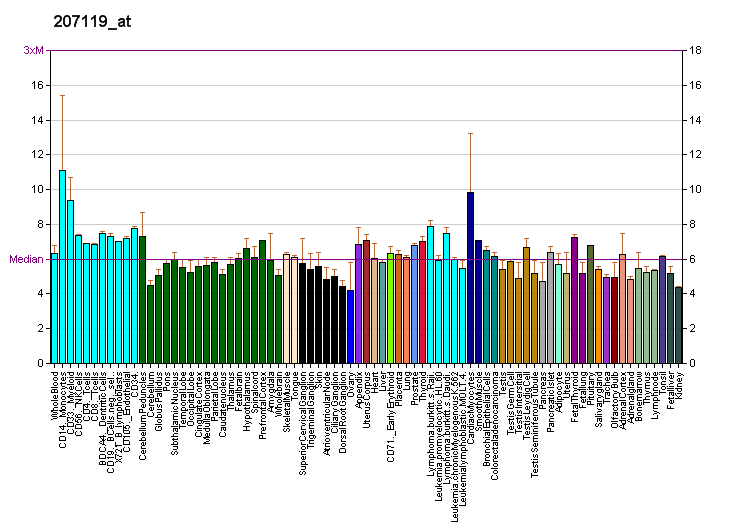

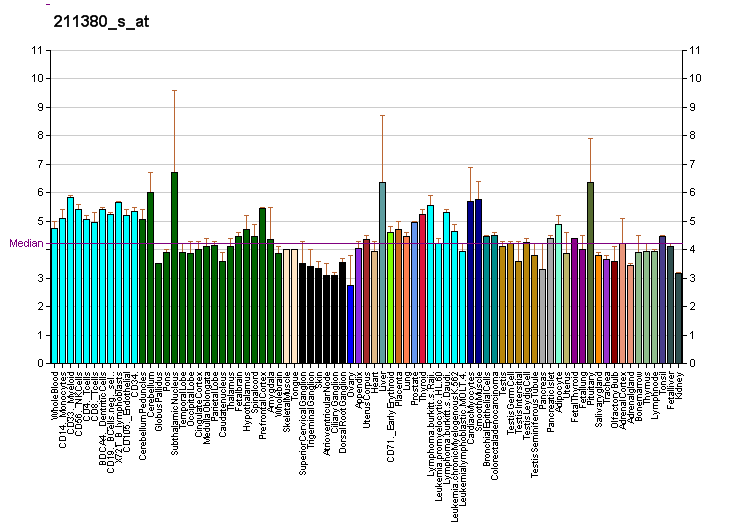
RNA expression pattern
| Bgee | Human / Mouse (ortholog); Top expressed in: saphenous vein; biceps brachii; Skeletal muscle tissue of biceps brachii; Descending thoracic aorta; ascending aorta; Skeletal muscle tissue of rectus abdominis; right coronary artery; popliteal artery; urethra; tibial arteries / Top expressed in: spermatid; lumbar spinal ganglion; epithelium of lens; trigeminal ganglion; soleus muscle; sternocleidomastoid muscle; digastric muscle; temporal muscle; intercostal muscle; zygote; More reference expression data |
| BioGPS | More reference expression data |
Gene ontology
| Molecular function | transferase activity; nucleotide binding; calcium channel regulator activity; cGMP binding; kinase activity; protein binding; catalytic activity; ATP binding; protein serine/threonine kinase activity; cGMP-dependent protein kinase activity; identical protein binding; protein kinase activity |
| Cellular component | cytoplasm; cytosol; Golgi apparatus; plasma membrane |
| Biological process | negative regulation of smooth muscle contraction; phosphorylation; regulation of GTPase activity; dendrite development; neuron migration; negative regulation of platelet aggregation; cGMP-mediated signaling; relaxation of vascular associated smooth muscle; forebrain development; metabolism; actin cytoskeleton organization; signal transduction; protein phosphorylation; negative regulation of vascular associated smooth muscle cell proliferation; negative regulation of vascular associated smooth muscle cell migration |
Sources:Amigo / QuickGO
Orthologs
| Databases | NCBI: entry; OMA: entry |
| Species | Human | Mouse |
| Entrez | 5592 | 19091 |
| Ensembl | ENSG00000185532 | ENSMUSG00000052920 |
| UniProt | Q13976 | P0C605 |
| RefSeq (mRNA) | NM_001098512; NM_006258; NM_001374781; NM_001374782 | NM_001013833; NM_011160 |
| RefSeq (protein) | NP_001091982; NP_006249; NP_001361710; NP_001361711 | NP_001013855; NP_035290 |
| Location (UCSC) | Chr 10: 50.99 – 52.3 Mb | Chr 19: 30.54 – 31.74 Mb |
| PubMed search |
- Wikidata
| View/Edit Human | View/Edit Mouse |

cGMP-dependent protein kinase 1, alpha isozyme is an enzyme that in humans is encoded by the PRKG1 gene.

== Interactions ==
PRKG1 has been shown to interact with:

- GTF2I,
- ITPR1,
- MRVI1,
- RGS2, and
- TNNT1.
