= 7q11.23 duplication syndrome =

- Other names: dup7, 7dup
- Specialty: Medical genetics, Neurology, Pediatrics
- Symptoms: Speech delay, anxiety, ADHD, oppositional defiant disorder, hypotonia, intellectual disability
- Complications: Dilation of the ascending aorta, seizures, hydrocephalus
- Usual onset: Congenital
- Causes: Microduplication of the 7q11.23 region (WBSCR) on chromosome 7
- Diagnostic method: Chromosomal microarray, FISH
- Treatment: Speech/language therapy, behavioral interventions
- Frequency: 1 in 7,500 to 1 in 20,000

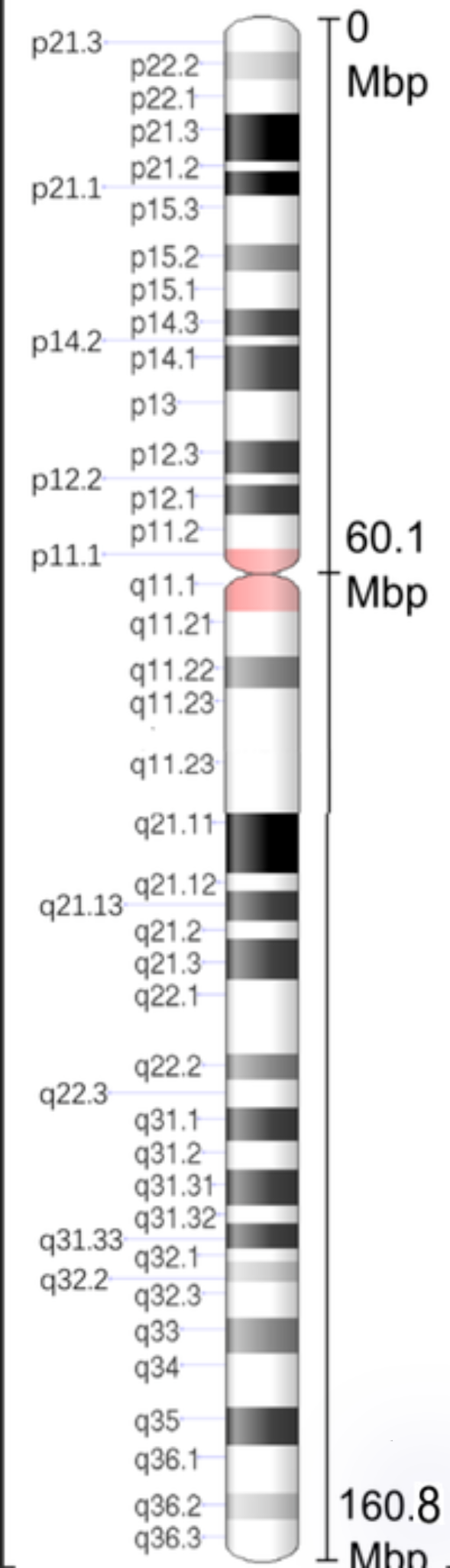
Location of the 7q11.23 duplication on chromosome 7

7q11.23 duplication syndrome (also called dup7 or 7dup) is a rare genetic syndrome caused by an extra copy of a segment of approximately 1.5 to 1.8 megabases on the long arm (q) of chromosome 7, in a region known as the Williams-Beuren syndrome critical region (WBSCR). The syndrome was first reported in 2005. It is characterized by neurological, behavioral, and other medical features that vary in severity. Common features include speech and language delays (including childhood apraxia of speech), hypotonia, anxiety disorders, selective mutism, attention-deficit/hyperactivity disorder (ADHD), oppositional defiant disorder, autism spectrum disorder, intellectual disability, and dilation of the ascending aorta.

The diagnosis is established by chromosomal microarray analysis detecting the duplication. There is no cure; treatment involves speech and language therapy, behavioral interventions, and management of medical complications such as aortic dilation and seizures. The prevalence is estimated at 1 in 7,500 to 1 in 20,000 people, though the syndrome is considered underdiagnosed.

== Signs and symptoms ==
=== Neurological ===
- Adventitious movements (involuntary movements, such as movements of one side of the body that mirror intentional movements of the other side) (in 83%)
- Delayed motor development and developmental coordination disorder (difficulty with coordination and clumsiness) (in 74.2%)
- Hypotonia (low muscle tone), which can affect posture, movement, and motor development such as sitting up and walking (in 58.5%)
- Seizures and epilepsy (episodes of abnormal electrical activity in the brain that can cause changes in behavior, movements, or consciousness) (in 19%)
- Hydrocephalus (a buildup of fluid in the cavities of the brain, which can increase pressure on the brain) (in 5.6%)

=== Speech and language ===
- Speech sound disorder, including childhood apraxia of speech (difficulty planning and coordinating the muscle movements needed to speak) and dysarthria (speech difficulty due to weak or poorly controlled muscles) (in 82.6%)
- Delayed speech and language development; expressive language (speaking) is usually more delayed than receptive language (understanding)

=== Behavioral ===
- Anxiety disorders, including social anxiety disorder (social phobia) and specific phobia (excessive fear of particular objects, situations, or settings such as medical visits), with at least 60% meeting criteria for at least one anxiety disorder
- Attention-deficit/hyperactivity disorder (ADHD), a pattern of inattention, hyperactivity, and impulsivity that interferes with functioning (in 35.5%)
- Selective mutism (a consistent inability to speak in certain social situations, such as at school, despite being able to speak in others) (in 29%)
- Oppositional defiant disorder (ODD), a recurrent pattern of negative, defiant behavior directed at adults and other authority figures
- Autism spectrum disorder (ASD), a developmental condition affecting communication and social interaction (in 20%)
- Intellectual disability (significantly below average intellectual functioning that affects everyday activities); approximately 18% have intellectual disability, with an additional 20% having borderline intellectual ability

=== Cardiovascular ===
- Dilation of the ascending aorta (enlargement of the main blood vessel carrying blood from the heart), which can worsen over time and requires ongoing monitoring (in 46%)

=== Other ===
- Chronic constipation (difficulty passing stools), a significant problem in 66% of children and 27% of adults
- Chronic otitis media (recurring middle ear infections) (in 25%)
- Strabismus (crossed or misaligned eyes) (in 15%)
- Joint hypermobility (unusually flexible joints)
- Refractive error (need for corrective lenses)
- Hearing loss (in 5%)
- Hypospadias (a birth defect in males where the opening of the urethra is not at the tip of the penis)

== Cause ==
7q11.23 duplication syndrome is a copy number variation known as a microduplication. It results from an extra copy of a region on the long (q) arm of chromosome 7. This region is called the Williams-Beuren syndrome critical region (WBSCR) because its deletion causes Williams syndrome. The duplicated region contains approximately 26 to 28 genes. The region is susceptible to chromosomal rearrangements due to flanking segmental duplications, which are stretches of repetitive DNA that can cause errors during cell division.

While deletion of this region causes Williams syndrome, duplication of the same region causes 7q11.23 duplication syndrome, with some contrasting features. For example, individuals with Williams syndrome tend to be socially outgoing, while those with 7q11.23 duplication syndrome tend to be socially anxious. Similarly, deletion leads to narrowing of the ascending aorta, while duplication leads to dilation of the ascending aorta.

Several genes within the duplicated region are thought to contribute to specific features of the syndrome. An extra copy of the ELN gene, which encodes the structural protein elastin, is likely related to the increased risk of aortic dilation. An extra copy of the GTF2I gene, which encodes a transcription factor involved in brain development, is associated with some of the behavioral features of the syndrome, including social anxiety. However, the specific contributions of individual genes to the overall phenotype remain unclear.

=== Inheritance ===
7q11.23 duplication syndrome is inherited in an autosomal dominant manner, meaning that one copy of the duplication is sufficient to cause the disorder. About 73% of cases arise as a new (de novo) genetic change that was not inherited from either parent. In the remaining 27% of cases, the duplication is inherited from an affected parent. When inherited, the parent often has subtle signs and symptoms and may not be diagnosed until after the condition is recognized in the child. Each child of an affected individual has a 50% chance of inheriting the duplication.

== Diagnosis ==
The diagnosis of 7q11.23 duplication syndrome may be suspected in individuals with a combination of delayed speech and motor development, speech sound disorders (particularly childhood apraxia of speech), behavioral issues such as social anxiety and selective mutism, and distinctive facial features. However, because the signs and symptoms vary widely, many affected individuals are not identified on the basis of clinical features alone.

The diagnosis is confirmed through genomic testing that detects a heterozygous 1.5 to 1.8 megabase duplication of the Williams-Beuren syndrome critical region. Chromosomal microarray analysis (also called array comparative genomic hybridization) is the standard method used to identify the duplication. A standard karyotype cannot detect the duplication because the duplicated region is too small to be visible under a microscope. Fluorescence in situ hybridization (FISH) can detect the duplication if it is specifically targeted, but it is not routinely used as an initial diagnostic test.

=== Recommended evaluations ===
Following diagnosis, a comprehensive set of evaluations is recommended to determine the extent of the condition and guide treatment. These include echocardiography to check for aortic dilation, kidney ultrasound, and consideration of brain MRI (though this typically requires sedation in young children and may not be necessary in every case). Developmental assessment of speech, language, and motor skills is recommended, along with evaluation for autism spectrum disorder using standardized tools such as the Autism Diagnostic Observation Schedule (ADOS) and Autism Diagnostic Interview (ADI-R), ideally by an examiner experienced with individuals who have social anxiety or selective mutism. Assessment for oppositional behavior and aggression, including functional behavioral assessment by a board-certified behavior analyst, is also recommended. Additional evaluations include hearing assessment, vision screening, and evaluation for seizures if clinically indicated.

== Treatment ==
There is no cure for 7q11.23 duplication syndrome. Treatment focuses on managing individual symptoms and supporting development.

=== Developmental therapies ===
Intensive speech and language therapy is recommended, particularly for children with childhood apraxia of speech, with the goal of developing effective oral communication and preventing or limiting later language impairment or reading disorder. Physical therapy is recommended for children with hypotonia (low muscle tone) and delayed motor milestones, while occupational therapy can help address difficulties with fine motor skills and coordination needed for daily activities.

=== Behavioral and psychological ===
Emotional and behavioral disorders, including social anxiety, selective mutism, and autism spectrum disorder, may be addressed with cognitive behavioral therapy (CBT). For individuals with oppositional behavior, aggression, or autism spectrum disorder, applied behavior analysis (ABA) and behavior modification interventions are recommended. Psychotropic medications may be used as needed to manage anxiety, ADHD, or other behavioral symptoms. Specialists advise that behavioral therapies should begin as early as possible, ideally before a child begins school, as early intervention during the preschool years can help develop self-regulation skills and may prevent progression to more severe behavioral difficulties. However, behavioral interventions, including parent management training, CBT, and ABA, remain effective at all ages, and identifying the underlying factors driving oppositional or aggressive behavior, such as social anxiety or impulsivity, can help clinicians develop targeted interventions regardless of when treatment begins.

=== Medical management ===
Standard anti-seizure medications are used to treat epilepsy when present. Aortic dilation requires ongoing cardiac monitoring, and standard treatment for congenital heart disease is applied when necessary.

=== Education ===
Early intervention programs are recommended for young children to address developmental delays. School-age children may benefit from special education services, and vocational training may be helpful for older individuals transitioning to adulthood.

== Epidemiology ==
The prevalence of 7q11.23 duplication syndrome is estimated to be between 1 in 7,500 and 1 in 20,000 people. A 2009 study screening individuals with intellectual disability estimated a population frequency of approximately 1 in 13,000 to 1 in 20,000. The syndrome is considered likely to be underdiagnosed because its features are milder and more variable than those of Williams syndrome, and many affected individuals may not come to clinical attention. As of 2021, more than 150 individuals with a classic 7q11.23 duplication had been identified in the medical literature. A 2011 genome-wide study identified 7q11.23 duplication as one of the most common recurrent copy number variations associated with autism spectrum disorder.

== History ==
Although the existence of a duplication reciprocal to the Williams syndrome deletion had been theorized since the mechanism of nonallelic homologous recombination was understood, the first case was not identified until late 2004. A boy being tested for 22q11.2 deletion syndrome (velocardiofacial syndrome) using real-time PCR was unexpectedly found to have a duplication of the elastin gene; further analysis confirmed a microduplication of the entire Williams-Beuren syndrome critical region. The case was published in 2005 by Somerville et al. in the New England Journal of Medicine, describing the syndrome as a distinct clinical entity. The original research team included investigators from the University of Toronto, the University of Louisville, and the University of Nevada School of Medicine.

Following this initial report, additional cases were identified through chromosomal microarray screening of individuals with intellectual disability, autism spectrum disorder, epilepsy, and other neurodevelopmental conditions. By 2007, Berg et al. had described further cases confirming the association with speech delay and autism spectrum behaviors. In 2009, Van der Aa et al. published 14 new cases and provided the first population frequency estimate. In 2015, two studies systematically characterized the physical and psychological features of the syndrome in 64 individuals. The first GeneReviews entry for the syndrome was published in November 2015 and updated in March 2021.

=== Research centers ===
Much of the published research on 7q11.23 duplication syndrome has been conducted by a multi-institutional collaboration. The Neurodevelopmental Sciences Lab at the University of Louisville, led by Carolyn B. Mervis, has studied the psychological, cognitive, and behavioral characteristics of the syndrome. Colleen A. Morris at the University of Nevada School of Medicine has investigated the physical characteristics, medical complications, and genotype-phenotype relationships. Lucy R. Osborne at the University of Toronto has studied the molecular genetics of the 7q11.23 region, including mouse models and individual gene function. Other contributing research groups include Bonita P. Klein-Tasman at the University of Wisconsin-Milwaukee (behavioral phenotype and autism spectrum symptomatology) and Shelley L. Velleman at the University of Vermont (speech and language characteristics). Research has been funded in part by the National Institutes of Health, the Simons Foundation, and the Canadian Institutes of Health Research.

== Society and culture ==
Duplication Cares is a nonprofit organization founded in March 2010 to support families of individuals diagnosed with 7q11.23 duplication syndrome and to raise awareness of the condition within the medical community. The organization maintains a private family support group, coordinates with researchers, and provides educational resources. The first international conference dedicated to 7q11.23 duplication syndrome was organized by Duplication Cares and held in Washington, D.C., in June 2018, featuring presentations by researchers in the field.

Simons Searchlight is an international patient registry and research program that includes 7q11.23 duplication syndrome among the more than 175 rare genetic neurodevelopmental disorders it tracks. The program collects participant information and biological samples to build a natural history database available to researchers.

Unique, a UK-based rare chromosome disorder support group, provides information guides and maintains a database of individuals with 7q11.23 duplication syndrome and other chromosomal conditions.
