= Carbonic anhydrase-related protein =

Protein-coding gene in the species Homo sapiens

CA8
Available structures
PDB	Ortholog search: PDBe RCSB
PDB	List of PDB id codes 2W2J

Identifiers
- Aliases: CA8, CA-VIII, CALS, CAMRQ3, CARP, CA-RP, carbonic anhydrase 8
- External IDs: OMIM: 114815; MGI: 88253; HomoloGene: 20861; GeneCards: CA8; OMA:CA8 - orthologs

Gene location (Human)
Chr.	Chromosome 8 (human)
Band	8q12.1	Start	60,185,412 bp
Band	8q12.1	End	60,281,400 bp

Gene location (Mouse)
Chr.	Chromosome 4 (mouse)
Band	4 A1|4 3.53 cM	Start	8,143,362 bp
Band	4 A1|4 3.53 cM	End	8,239,041 bp
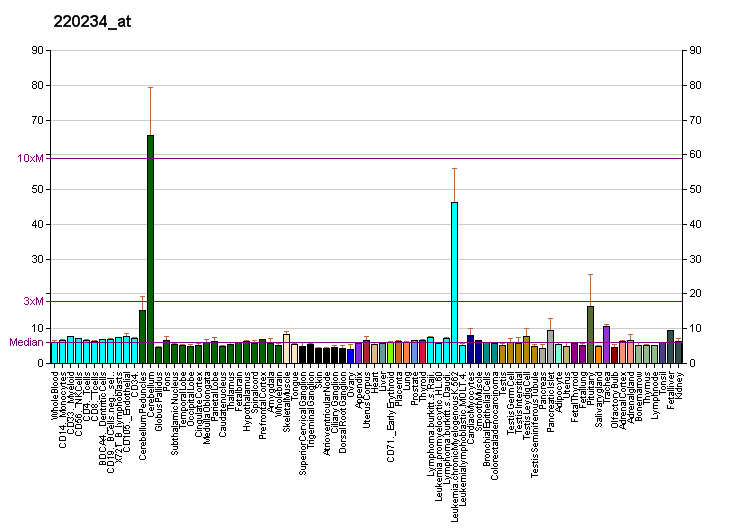
RNA expression pattern
Bgee	Human / Mouse (ortholog); Top expressed in: right hemisphere of cerebellum; gonad; testicle; cerebellar vermis; right testis; left testis; anterior pituitary; caudate nucleus; islet of Langerhans; amygdala / Top expressed in: lobe of cerebellum; cerebellar vermis; crypt of lieberkuhn of small intestine; Paneth cell; migratory enteric neural crest cell; right lung; left lung lobe; right lung lobe; deep cerebellar nuclei; epithelium of lens; More reference expression data
BioGPS	More reference expression data
Gene ontology
Molecular function	carbonate dehydratase activity; zinc ion binding; protein binding; metal ion binding; carbonic anhydrase
Cellular component	cytoplasm
Biological process	phosphatidylinositol-mediated signaling
Sources:Amigo / QuickGO
Orthologs
Species	Human	Mouse
Entrez	767	12319
Ensembl	ENSG00000178538	ENSMUSG00000041261
UniProt	P35219	P28651
RefSeq (mRNA)	NM_004056; NM_001321837; NM_001321838; NM_001321839	NM_007592
RefSeq (protein)	NP_001308766; NP_001308767; NP_001308768; NP_004047	NP_031618
Location (UCSC)	Chr 8: 60.19 – 60.28 Mb	Chr 4: 8.14 – 8.24 Mb
PubMed search
- Wikidata
View/Edit Human	View/Edit Mouse

Carbonic anhydrase-related protein is a protein that in humans is encoded by the CA8 gene. The CA8 protein lacks the catalytic activity of other carbonic anhydrase enzymes. A rare, autosomal recessive form of cerebellar ataxia known as "cerebellar ataxia, mental retardation, and dysequilibrium syndrome 3" (CAMRQ3) is caused by mutations in the CA8 gene.

== Function ==
The protein encoded by this gene was initially named CA-related protein because of sequence similarity to other known carbonic anhydrase genes. However, the gene product lacks carbonic anhydrase activity (i.e., the reversible hydration of carbon dioxide). The gene product continues to carry a carbonic anhydrase designation based on clear sequence identity to other members of the carbonic anhydrase gene family. The absence of CA8 gene transcription in the cerebellum of the lurcher mutant in mice with a neurologic defect suggests an important role for this acatalytic form.

== Interactions ==
CA8 has been shown to interact with ITPR1.
