= GNB2 =

Protein-coding gene in the species Homo sapiens

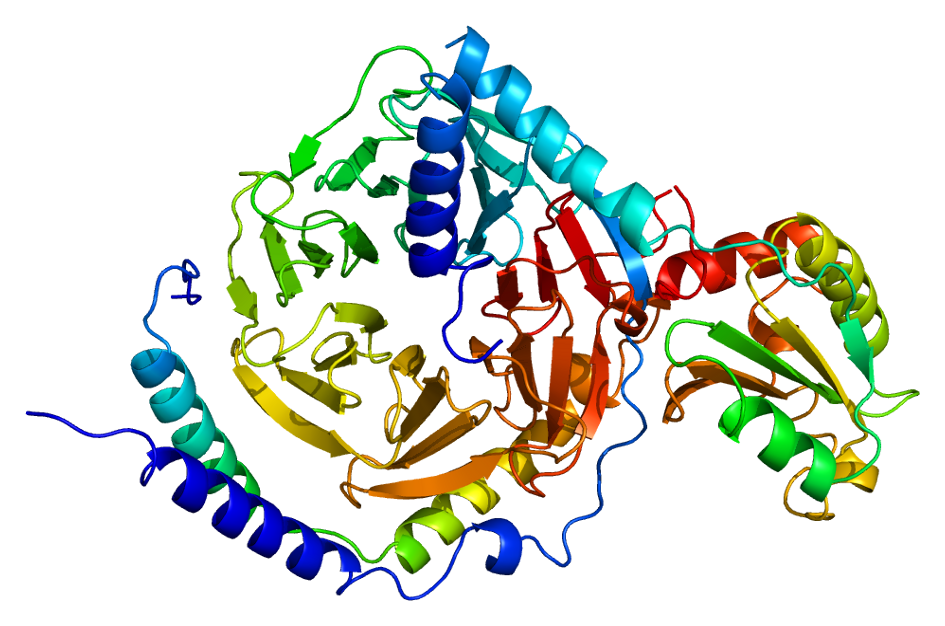

Identifiers
- Aliases: GNB2, G protein subunit beta 2, SSS4, SSS4; NEDHYDF, HG2C1
- External IDs: OMIM: 139390; MGI: 95784; GeneCards: GNB2

Gene location (Human)
Chr.	Chromosome 7 (human)
Band	7q22.1	Start	100,673,567 bp
Band	7q22.1	End	100,679,174 bp
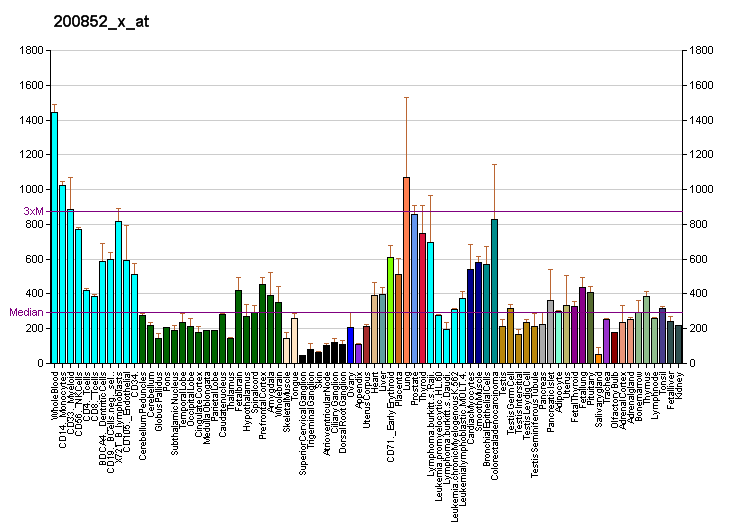
RNA expression pattern
Bgee	Human / Mouse (ortholog); Top expressed in: ventricular zone; anterior pituitary; granulocyte; stromal cell of endometrium; skin of leg; ganglionic eminence; right uterine tube; olfactory zone of nasal mucosa; skin of abdomen; ectocervix / n/a; More reference expression data
BioGPS	More reference expression data
Gene ontology
Molecular function	protein-containing complex binding; calcium channel regulator activity; signal transducer activity; protein binding; GTPase activity; GTPase binding
Cellular component	cytoplasm; cell body; vesicle; membrane; focal adhesion; myelin sheath; plasma membrane; lysosomal membrane; perinuclear region of cytoplasm; extracellular exosome; cytosol; extracellular space; protein-containing complex
Biological process	G protein-coupled receptor signaling pathway; cellular response to glucagon stimulus; signal transduction; protein folding; regulation of molecular function
Sources:Amigo / QuickGO
Orthologs
Databases	NCBI: entry; OMA: entry
Species	Human	Mouse
Entrez	2783	14693
Ensembl	ENSG00000172354	n/a
UniProt	P62879	P62880
RefSeq (mRNA)	NM_005273	NM_010312
RefSeq (protein)	NP_005264	NP_034442
Location (UCSC)	Chr 7: 100.67 – 100.68 Mb	n/a
PubMed search
- Wikidata
View/Edit Human	View/Edit Mouse

Guanine nucleotide-binding protein G(I)/G(S)/G(T) subunit beta-2 is a protein that in humans is encoded by the GNB2 gene.

Heterotrimeric guanine nucleotide-binding proteins (G proteins), which integrate signals between receptors and effector proteins, are composed of an alpha, a beta, and a gamma subunit. These subunits are encoded by families of related genes.

This gene encodes a beta subunit. Beta subunits are important regulators of alpha subunits, as well as of certain signal transduction receptors and effectors. This gene contains a trinucleotide (CCG) repeat length polymorphism in its 5' UTR.
