= GNG2 =

Protein-coding gene in the species Homo sapiens

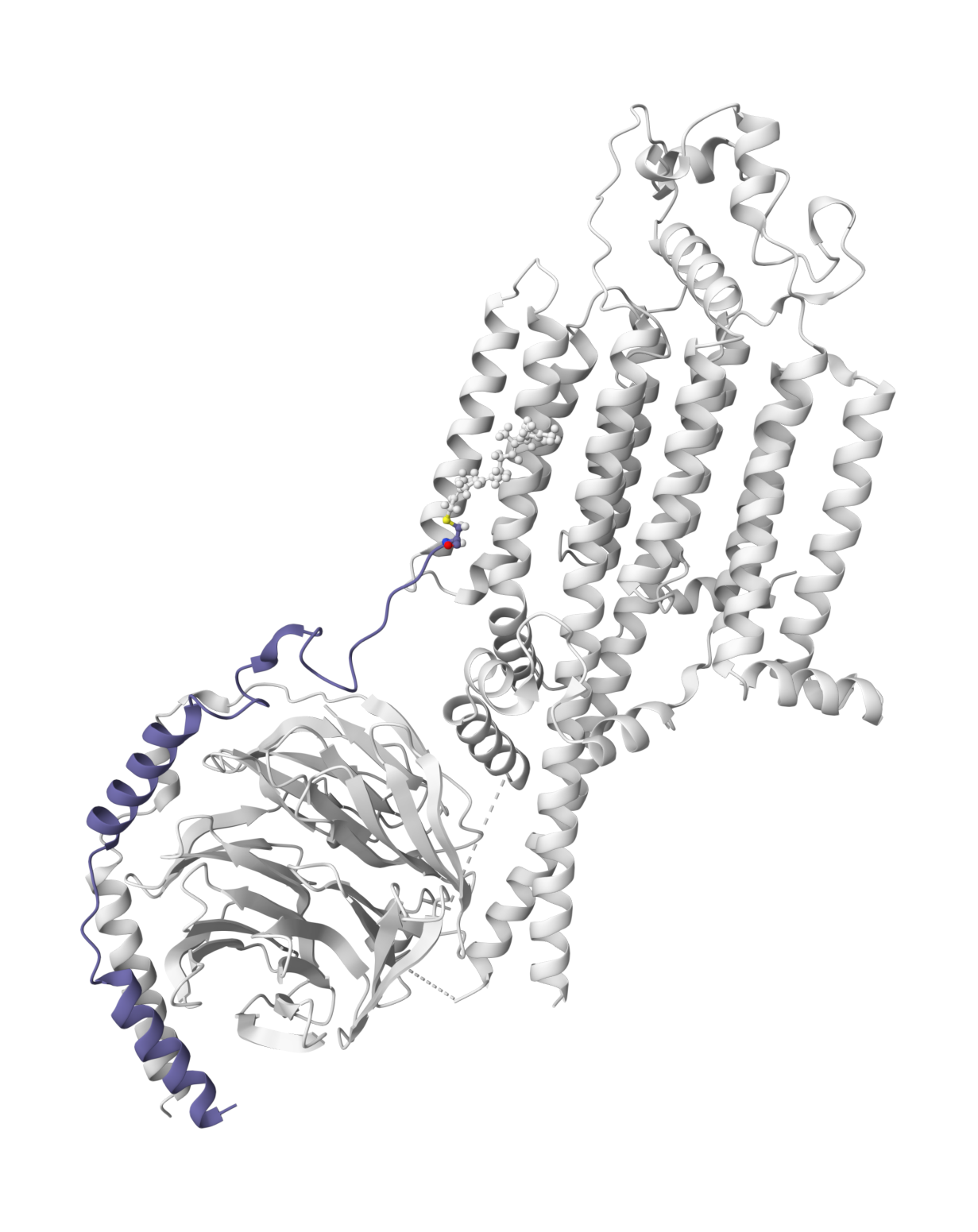

Identifiers
- Aliases: GNG2, G protein subunit gamma 2
- External IDs: OMIM: 606981; MGI: 102705; GeneCards: GNG2
Available structures
PDB	Ortholog search: PDBe RCSB
PDB	List of PDB id codes 4KFM, 5HE3, 5HE0, 5HE2, 5HE1

Gene location (Human)
Chr.	Chromosome 14 (human)
Band	14q22.1	Start	51,826,195 bp
Band	14q22.1	End	51,979,342 bp

Gene location (Mouse)
Chr.	Chromosome 14 (mouse)
Band	14 A3|14 11.17 cM	Start	19,922,627 bp
Band	14 A3|14 11.17 cM	End	20,027,695 bp
RNA expression pattern
Bgee	Human / Mouse (ortholog); Top expressed in: secondary oocyte; ganglionic eminence; left testis; right testis; bone marrow cell; Brodmann area 46; middle temporal gyrus; epithelium of colon; blood; spinal ganglia / Top expressed in: dentate gyrus of hippocampal formation granule cell; ganglionic eminence; medial ganglionic eminence; dorsomedial hypothalamic nucleus; granulocyte; paraventricular nucleus of hypothalamus; arcuate nucleus; subiculum; lateral hypothalamus; median eminence; More reference expression data
BioGPS	n/a
Gene ontology
Molecular function	signal transducer activity; G-protein beta-subunit binding; protein binding; GTPase activity
Cellular component	heterotrimeric G-protein complex; plasma membrane; extracellular exosome; membrane; G-protein beta/gamma-subunit complex
Biological process	cellular response to glucagon stimulus; cell population proliferation; signal transduction; cellular response to catecholamine stimulus; platelet activation; adenylate cyclase-activating dopamine receptor signaling pathway; cellular response to prostaglandin E stimulus; protein folding; Wnt signaling pathway, calcium modulating pathway; G protein-coupled receptor signaling pathway
Sources:Amigo / QuickGO
Orthologs
Databases	NCBI: entry; OMA: entry
Species	Human	Mouse
Entrez	54331	14702
Ensembl	ENSG00000186469	ENSMUSG00000043004
UniProt	P59768	P63213
RefSeq (mRNA)	NM_001243773; NM_001243774; NM_053064	NM_001038637; NM_001285908; NM_001285909; NM_001285910; NM_001285911 NM_010315
RefSeq (protein)	NP_001230702; NP_001230703; NP_444292	NP_001033726; NP_001272837; NP_001272838; NP_001272839; NP_001272840 NP_034445
Location (UCSC)	Chr 14: 51.83 – 51.98 Mb	Chr 14: 19.92 – 20.03 Mb
PubMed search
- Wikidata
View/Edit Human	View/Edit Mouse

Guanine nucleotide-binding protein G(I)/G(S)/G(O) subunit gamma-2 is a protein that in humans is encoded by the GNG2 gene.

Heterotrimeric G proteins play vital roles in cellular responses to external signals. The specificity of a G protein-receptor interaction is primarily mediated by the gamma subunit.[supplied by OMIM]

== Interactive pathway map ==
Click on genes, proteins and metabolites below to link to respective articles. (Note: The interactive pathway map can be edited at WikiPathways: "NicotineDopaminergic_WP1602".)

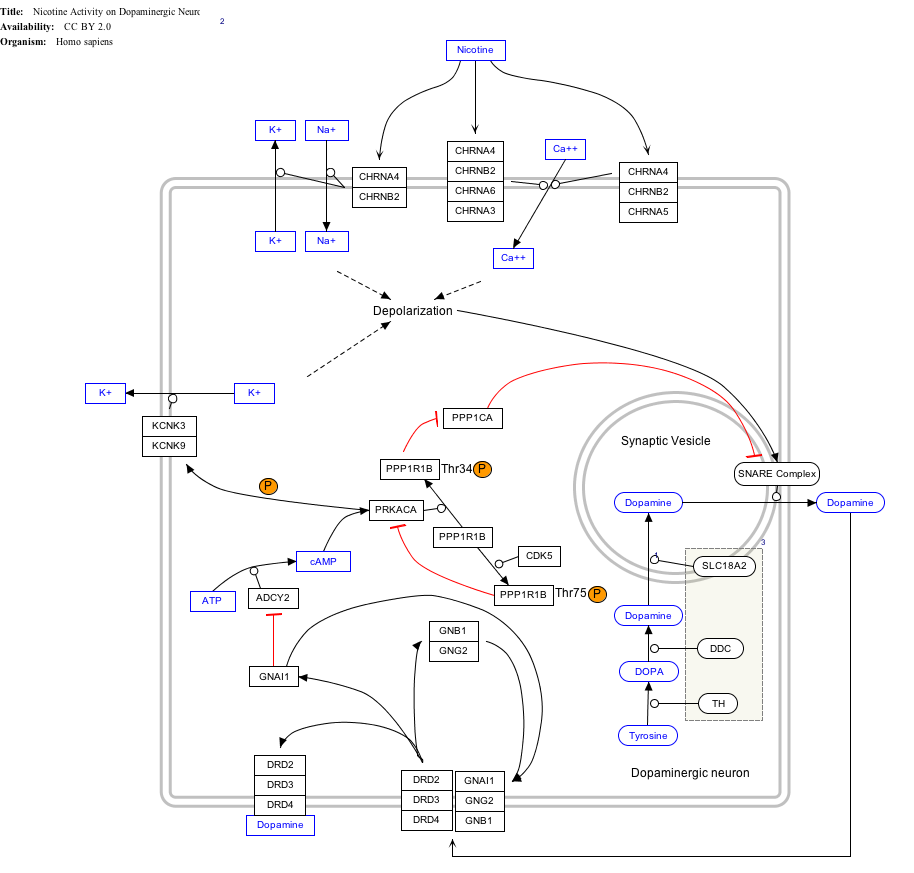

Nicotine Activity on Dopaminergic Neurons edit
