= California State Route 8 =

Two highways in the U.S. state of California have been signed as Route 8:

- Interstate 8 in California, part of the Interstate Highway System but simply referred to as "Route 8" in state law
- California State Route 8 (1934–1964), now SR 26
