= Calcium-binding protein 1 =

Protein found in humans

CABP1

Identifiers
- Aliases: CABP1, CALBRAIN, HCALB_BR, calcium binding protein 1
- External IDs: OMIM: 605563; MGI: 1352750; GeneCards: CABP1
Available structures
| PDB | Ortholog search: PDBe RCSB |
| PDB | List of PDB id codes 2K7B, 2K7C, 2K7D, 2LAN, 2LAP, 3OX5, 3OX6 |

Gene location (Human)
| Chr. | Chromosome 12 (human) |
| Band | 12q24.31 | Start | 120,640,626 bp |
| Band | 12q24.31 | End | 120,667,324 bp |

Gene location (Mouse)
| Chr. | Chromosome 5 (mouse) |
| Band | 5|5 F | Start | 115,306,748 bp |
| Band | 5|5 F | End | 115,332,440 bp |
RNA expression pattern
| Bgee | Human / Mouse (ortholog); Top expressed in: right frontal lobe; Brodmann area 10; cingulate gyrus; anterior cingulate cortex; Brodmann area 9; primary visual cortex; frontal pole; superior frontal gyrus; parietal lobe; postcentral gyrus / Top expressed in: neural layer of retina; superior frontal gyrus; primary visual cortex; dentate gyrus of hippocampal formation granule cell; cerebellar cortex; prefrontal cortex; hippocampus proper; primary motor cortex; anterior horn of spinal cord; ventricular zone; More reference expression data |
| BioGPS | n/a |
Gene ontology
| Molecular function | enzyme inhibitor activity; calcium ion binding; protein binding; nuclear localization sequence binding; calcium-dependent protein binding; metal ion binding |
| Cellular component | cytoplasm; perinuclear region of cytoplasm; cell junction; Golgi membrane; plasma membrane; postsynaptic membrane; Golgi apparatus; cell cortex; synapse; cytoskeleton; postsynaptic density; membrane; extracellular space |
| Biological process | negative regulation of protein import into nucleus; negative regulation of catalytic activity; visual perception; response to stimulus |
Sources:Amigo / QuickGO
Orthologs
| Databases | NCBI: entry; OMA: entry |
| Species | Human | Mouse |
| Entrez | 9478 | 29867 |
| Ensembl | ENSG00000157782 | ENSMUSG00000029544 |
| UniProt | Q9NZU7 | Q9JLK7 |
| RefSeq (mRNA) | NM_031205; NM_001033677; NM_004276 | NM_013879; NM_001310712; NM_001310715 |
| RefSeq (protein) | NP_001028849; NP_004267; NP_112482 | NP_001297641; NP_001297644; NP_038907 |
| Location (UCSC) | Chr 12: 120.64 – 120.67 Mb | Chr 5: 115.31 – 115.33 Mb |
| PubMed search |
- Wikidata
| View/Edit Human | View/Edit Mouse |

Calcium binding protein 1 is a protein that in humans is encoded by the CABP1 gene. Calcium-binding protein 1 is a calcium-binding protein discovered in 1999. It has two EF hand motifs and is expressed in neuronal cells in such areas as hippocampus, habenular nucleus of the epithalamus, Purkinje cell layer of the cerebellum, and the amacrine cells and cone bipolar cells of the retina.

Calcium-binding protein 1 which is a neuron-specific member of the calmodulin (CaM) superfamily which modulates Ca^{2+}-dependent activity of inositol trisphosphate receptors (InsP3RS). L-CaBP1 is also associated with the cytoskeleton structures. But the S-CaBP1 is situated in or near the plasma membrane. In brain, CaBp1 is found in the cerebral cortex and hippocampus and in the protein, Cabp1 is found in cone bipolar and amacrine cells. We can also express that CaBP1 may regulate Ca^{2+} dependent activity of InSP3Rs by promoting structural contacts between suppressor and core domains but has no effect on INsP3 binding to the receptor. CaBP1 contains four EF-hands in two separate domains namely, EF1 and Ef2 is contained in N-domain whereas Ef3 and EF4 is contained in c domain to which Ca^{2+} binds. Calcium-binding protein 1 (CaBP1) is placed in the lumen of the endoplasmic reticulum.it is relocated outside cells during apoptosis and involved in the phagocytosis of apoptotic cells. CaBP1 and CaM. lobes fold independently. CaBP1-CaM chimeras based on exchange of three elements these are N-lobe, C-lobe and inter lobe linker. Expression of CaBP1 helps to block Ca^{2+}-dependent facilitation of P/Q-type Ca^{2+} current which is markedly reduced facilitation of synaptic transmission.

== Protein structure ==
Protein that attributes for CABP1 Gene is homodimer. It interacts with ITPR1, ITPR2 and ITPR3 via C-terminus. The binding is calcium dependent and the interaction correlates with calcium concentration. CABP1 also interacts with CACNA1A in the pre and post synaptic membranes via C-terminal calcium binding motif. It also interacts with CACNA1C via C-terminal C and IQ motifs. It interacts with TRPC5 and also interacts with MAP1LC3B via C-terminus and EF-hands 1 and 2 respectively. It interacts with C9orf9. It also interacts NSMF via the central NLF- containing motif region. This interaction occurs in calcium dependent manner after the Synaptic NMDA receptor stimulation and thus this prevents nuclear import of NSMF.

== Function ==
Calcium binding proteins are an important component of calcium mediated cellular signal transduction. This gene encodes a protein that belongs to a subfamily of calcium binding proteins which share similarity to calmodulin. The protein encoded by this gene regulates the gating of voltage-gated calcium ion channels. This protein causes rapid inactivation that is independent of calcium, and does not support Calcium-dependent facilitation. CAbp1 suppresses the inactivated calcium dependent CACNA1D. it also inhibits TRPC5. CABP1 prevents NMDA receptor- induced cellular degeneration. This protein also regulates calcium-dependent activity of inositol 1,4,5-triphosphate receptors, P/Q-type voltage-gated calcium channels, and transient receptor potential channel TRPC5. This gene is predominantly expressed in retina and brain.

CaBP1 And CaM both bind to IQ-domain in the cytoplasmic C-terminal domain. Mutations of the IQ-Domain that weakens this two protein binding, stops the functional effect of CaM but not CaBP1. If the N-terminal domain is deleted it abolishes the effect of CaBP1 prolonging Ca_{v}1.2 Ca^{2+} currents, but spared Ca^{2+}-dependent is inactivated due to CaM overexpressed L-CaBP1 suppresses the rise in [Ca^{2+}] in response to physiological agonists acting on purinergic receptors and thus this inhibition occurs in large part to blockade of release from intracellular Ca^{2+} stores. The related protein neuronal calcium sensor-1did not get affected on the [Ca^{2+}] responses to agonist stimulation. Measurement of [Ca^{2+}] within the ER of permeabilized PC12 cells demonstrated that LCaBP1 directly inhibited InsP3-mediated Ca^{2+} release. Expression of L-CaBP1 also help in the inhibition of histamine-induced [Ca^{2+}] oscillations in HeLa cells. L-CaBP1 is able to specifically regulate InsP3 receptor-mediated alterations in [Ca^{2+}] during agonist stimulation.

Cellular expression of caldendrin is restricted to the somatodendritic compartment, with the exception of hypothalamus, where axonal labeling was detected. CAbP1 and CAbP2 contain a consensus sequence for N-terminal myristoylation. Transcription factor binding sites identified by Qiagen in the CABP1 gene promoter include Nkx2-5, RSRFC4, TAL1, and HSF1. CaBP1 interacts with inositol 1,4,5-triphosphate (InsP3) receptors to elicit channel activation when InsP3 is absent.

== Clinical significance ==
In schizophrenia, one study demonstrated a decrease in the number of CABP1-expressing cells, specifically in the left dorsolateral prefrontal cortex. This change, however, was compensated on a whole-brain scale by an increase in the protein levels.
