= Inositol-1,3,4-trisphosphate 5/6-kinase =

inositol-1,3,4-trisphosphate 5/6-kinase

Identifiers
- EC no.: 2.7.1.159
- CAS no.: 288307-53-9

Databases
- IntEnz: IntEnz view
- BRENDA: BRENDA entry
- ExPASy: NiceZyme view
- KEGG: KEGG entry
- MetaCyc: metabolic pathway
- PRIAM: profile
- PDB structures: RCSB PDB PDBe PDBsum
Search
- PMC: articles
- PubMed: articles
- NCBI: proteins

inositol-1,3,4-trisphosphate 5/6-kinase (EC 2.7.1.159, Ins(1,3,4)P3 5/6-kinase, inositol trisphosphate 5/6-kinase) is an enzyme with systematic name ATP:1D-myo-inositol 1,3,4-trisphosphate 5-phosphotransferase. This enzyme catalyses the following chemical reaction

(1) ATP + 1D-myo-inositol 1,3,4-trisphosphate $\rightleftharpoons$ ADP + 1D-myo-inositol 1,3,4,5-tetrakisphosphate
(2) ATP + 1D-myo-inositol 1,3,4-trisphosphate $\rightleftharpoons$ ADP + 1D-myo-inositol 1,3,4,6-tetrakisphosphate

In humans, this enzyme, along with EC 2.7.1.127 (inositol-trisphosphate 3-kinase), EC 2.7.1.140 (inositol-tetrakisphosphate 5-kinase) and EC 2.7.1.158 (inositol pentakisphosphate 2-kinase) is involved in the production of inositol hexakisphosphate (InsP6).
