= Inositol polyphosphate kinase =

Enzyme family

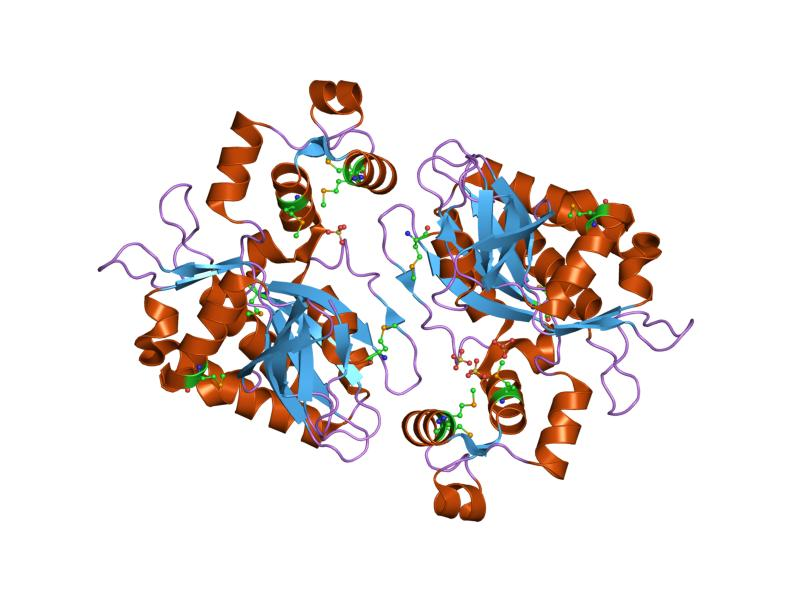
- Structure of the Inositol 1,4,5-trisphosphate 3-kinase A protein.

Identifiers
- Symbol: IPK
- Pfam: PF03770
- InterPro: IPR005522
- SCOP2: 1tzd / SCOPe / SUPFAM
Available protein structures:
- PDB: IPR005522 PF03770 (ECOD; PDBsum)
- AlphaFold: IPR005522; PF03770

Inositol polyphosphate kinase (IPK) is a family of enzymes that have a similar 3-dimensional structure. All members of the family catalyze the transfer of phosphate groups from ATP to various inositol phosphates. Members of the family include inositol-polyphosphate multikinases, inositol-hexakisphosphate kinases, inositol-trisphosphate 3-kinases, and inositol-pentakisphosphate 2-kinase, which is more distantly related to the others.

The discovery of the IPK family occurred in 1999, when a combination of biochemistry, sequence analysis, and genetics led to the classification of a family of inositol polyphosphate kinases. In 2005, the first crystal structures of an IPK family protein were published for ITPKA.

Subsequently, structures of the inositol polyphosphate multikinase and various IP6 kinases have expanded our structural understanding for how each enzyme catalyzes its specific reaction(s).
