= ITPKC =

Protein-coding gene in the species Homo sapiens

Identifiers
- Aliases: ITPKC, IP3-3KC, IP3KC, inositol-trisphosphate 3-kinase C
- External IDs: OMIM: 606476; MGI: 2442554; GeneCards: ITPKC
Available structures
PDB	Ortholog search: PDBe RCSB
PDB	List of PDB id codes 2A98
Enzyme activity
EC #	BRENDA	ExPASy	KEGG	MetaCyc
2.7.1.127	↗	↗	↗	↗

Gene location (Human)
Chr.	Chromosome 19 (human)
Band	19q13.2	Start	40,717,112 bp
Band	19q13.2	End	40,740,860 bp

Gene location (Mouse)
Chr.	Chromosome 7 (mouse)
Band	7|7 A3	Start	26,906,597 bp
Band	7|7 A3	End	26,928,086 bp
RNA expression pattern
Bgee	Human / Mouse (ortholog); Top expressed in: skin of leg; amniotic fluid; skin of abdomen; left uterine tube; olfactory zone of nasal mucosa; right lung; epithelium of esophagus; gastric mucosa; upper lobe of left lung; ectocervix / Top expressed in: lip; esophagus; decidua; jejunum; skin of back; skin of abdomen; ileum; colon; skin of external ear; duodenum; More reference expression data
BioGPS	n/a
Gene ontology
Molecular function	kinase activity; transferase activity; nucleotide binding; ATP binding; calmodulin binding; inositol-1,4,5-trisphosphate 3-kinase activity
Cellular component	cytoplasm; cytosol; nucleus; nuclear speck
Biological process	inositol phosphate metabolic process; phosphorylation; inositol phosphate biosynthetic process
Sources:Amigo / QuickGO
Orthologs
Databases	NCBI: entry; OMA: entry
Species	Human	Mouse
Entrez	80271	233011
Ensembl	ENSG00000086544	ENSMUSG00000003752
UniProt	Q96DU7	Q7TS72
RefSeq (mRNA)	NM_025194	NM_181593
RefSeq (protein)	NP_079470	NP_853624
Location (UCSC)	Chr 19: 40.72 – 40.74 Mb	Chr 7: 26.91 – 26.93 Mb
PubMed search
- Wikidata
View/Edit Human	View/Edit Mouse

Inositol-trisphosphate 3-kinase C is a protein that in humans is encoded by the ITPKC gene. It is one of 3 human genes that encode for an Inositol-trisphosphate 3-kinase. This gene that has been associated with Kawasaki disease. Kawasaki disease is an acute febrile illness that involves the inflammation of blood vessels throughout the body. The majority of cases that have been diagnosed involve children under the age of 5. In untreated cases involving children, 15 to 25 percent of these cases developed coronary artery aneurysms. The overproduction of T cells may be correlated with the immune hyperactivity in Kawasaki disease.

== Gene ==
This gene is located at chromosome 19q13.1, it codes for one of three isoenzymes. The other two enzymes being ITPKA and ITPKB. ITPKC is involved in the Ca(2+)/NFAT pathway, negatively regulating T cell activation.

== Clinical significance ==
A mutation in this gene occurs through a single-nucleotide polymorphism. When a mutation occurs the gene does not produce a functioning enzyme, meaning it will no longer be effective in negatively regulating T cells. When there is this reduced expression of the enzyme, ITPKC, there is a higher amount of IP3 which leads to the calcium channels being opened, and a higher amount of calcium being released. Leading to overly active T cells, and having this mutation in ITPKC is correlated to the increased risk of developing symptoms.

== See also ==
- ITPR1
- Inositol triphosphate
