= ITPKB =

Protein-coding gene in humans

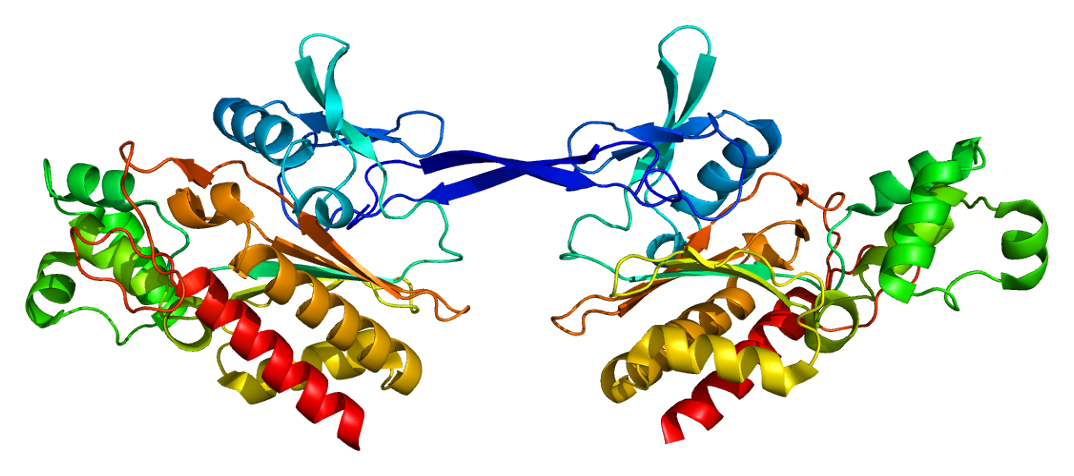

Identifiers
- Aliases: ITPKB, IP3-3KB, IP3K, IP3K-B, IP3KB, PIG37, inositol-trisphosphate 3-kinase B
- External IDs: OMIM: 147522; MGI: 109235; GeneCards: ITPKB
Enzyme activity
| EC # | BRENDA | ExPASy | KEGG | MetaCyc |
|---|---|---|---|---|
| 2.7.1.127 | ↗ | ↗ | ↗ | ↗ |

Gene location (Human)
| Chr. | Chromosome 1 (human) |
| Band | 1q42.12 | Start | 226,631,690 bp |
| Band | 1q42.12 | End | 226,739,323 bp |

Gene location (Mouse)
| Chr. | Chromosome 1 (mouse) |
| Band | 1 H4|1 84.27 cM | Start | 180,158,050 bp |
| Band | 1 H4|1 84.27 cM | End | 180,252,367 bp |
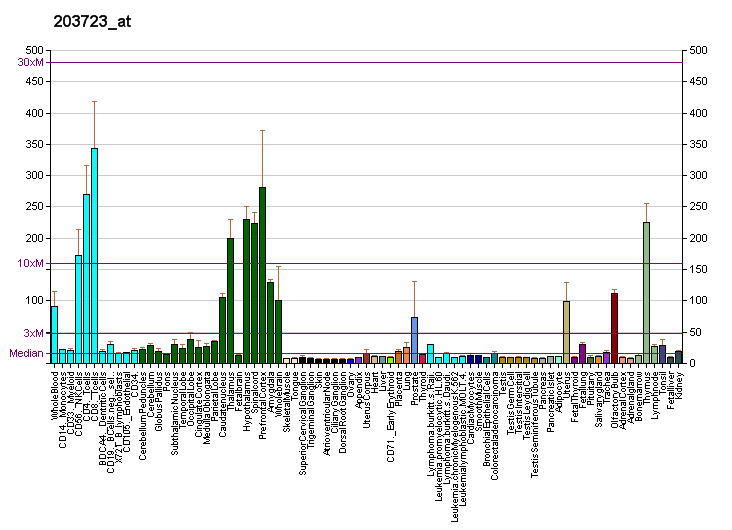
RNA expression pattern
| Bgee | Human / Mouse (ortholog); Top expressed in: external globus pallidus; pars reticulata; dorsal motor nucleus of vagus nerve; internal globus pallidus; inferior olivary nucleus; pars compacta; subthalamic nucleus; ventral tegmental area; superior vestibular nucleus; middle frontal gyrus / Top expressed in: choroid plexus of fourth ventricle; lactiferous gland; sciatic nerve; islet of Langerhans; right lung; internal carotid artery; blood; thymus; left lung; right lung lobe; More reference expression data |
| BioGPS | More reference expression data |
Gene ontology
| Molecular function | transferase activity; nucleotide binding; calmodulin binding; kinase activity; protein binding; ATP binding; inositol-1,4,5-trisphosphate 3-kinase activity |
| Cellular component | cytosol; membrane; nucleus |
| Biological process | regulation of protein phosphorylation; cellular response to calcium ion; negative regulation of neutrophil apoptotic process; phosphorylation; common myeloid progenitor cell proliferation; myeloid cell homeostasis; positive regulation of Ras protein signal transduction; inositol phosphate metabolic process; inositol trisphosphate metabolic process; MAPK cascade; cell surface receptor signaling pathway; T cell differentiation; positive thymic T cell selection; negative regulation of myeloid cell differentiation; positive regulation of alpha-beta T cell differentiation; thymic T cell selection; signal transduction; inositol phosphate biosynthetic process |
Sources:Amigo / QuickGO
Orthologs
| Databases | NCBI: entry; OMA: entry |
| Species | Human | Mouse |
| Entrez | 3707 | 320404 |
| Ensembl | ENSG00000143772 | ENSMUSG00000038855 |
| UniProt | P27987 | B2RXC2 |
| RefSeq (mRNA) | NM_002221; NM_001388404 | NM_001081175 |
| RefSeq (protein) | NP_002212 | NP_001074644 |
| Location (UCSC) | Chr 1: 226.63 – 226.74 Mb | Chr 1: 180.16 – 180.25 Mb |
| PubMed search |
- Wikidata
| View/Edit Human | View/Edit Mouse |

Inositol-trisphosphate 3-kinase B is an enzyme that in humans is encoded by the ITPKB gene.

== Function ==
The protein encoded by the ITPKB gene is one of 3 isoforms of Inositol-trisphosphate 3-kinase expressed in humans. ITPKB protein regulates inositol phosphate metabolism by phosphorylation of second messenger inositol 1,4,5-trisphosphate, which releases calcium from intracellular store in the endoplasmic reticulum by gating the inositol trisphosphate receptor. ITPKB produces Ins(1,3,4,5)P4, which does not gate the inositol trisphosphate receptor. The enzyme specifically phosphorylates the 1,4,5 isomer of IP3. The activity of this encoded protein is responsible for regulating the levels of a large number of inositol polyphosphates that are important in cellular signaling. Both calcium/calmodulin and protein phosphorylation mechanisms control its activity. Itpkb regulates immune cell function and is required for T and B cell development.
