= Phosphoinositide 5-phosphatase =

phosphoinositide 5-phosphatase

Identifiers
- EC no.: 3.1.3.36
- CAS no.: 9036-01-5

Databases
- IntEnz: IntEnz view
- BRENDA: BRENDA entry
- ExPASy: NiceZyme view
- KEGG: KEGG entry
- MetaCyc: metabolic pathway
- PRIAM: profile
- PDB structures: RCSB PDB PDBe PDBsum
- Gene Ontology: AmiGO / QuickGO
Search
- PMC: articles
- PubMed: articles
- NCBI: proteins

The enzyme phosphoinositide 5-phosphatase (EC 3.1.3.36) catalyzes the reaction

1-phosphatidyl-1D-myo-inositol 4,5-bisphosphate + H_{2}O $\rightleftharpoons$ 1-phosphatidyl-1D-myo-inositol 4-phosphate + phosphate

This enzyme belongs to the family of hydrolases, specifically those acting on phosphoric monoester bonds. The systematic name is phosphatidyl-myo-inositol-4,5-bisphosphate 4-phosphohydrolase. Other names in common use include type II inositol polyphosphate 5-phosphatase, triphosphoinositide phosphatase, IP3 phosphatase, PtdIns(4,5)P_{2} phosphatase, triphosphoinositide phosphomonoesterase, diphosphoinositide phosphatase, inositol 1,4,5-triphosphate 5-phosphomonoesterase, inositol triphosphate 5-phosphomonoesterase, phosphatidylinositol-bisphosphatase, phosphatidyl-myo-inositol-4,5-bisphosphate phosphatase, phosphatidylinositol 4,5-bisphosphate phosphatase, polyphosphoinositol lipid 5-phosphatase, and phosphatidyl-inositol-bisphosphate phosphatase. This enzyme participates in inositol phosphate metabolism and phosphatidylinositol signaling system.

== Structural studies ==
As of late 2007, 4 structures have been solved for this class of enzymes, with PDB accession codes 1UFW, 1W80, 2DNR, and 2QV2.
