= Myo-inosose-2 dehydratase =

myo-inosose-2 dehydratase

Identifiers
- EC no.: 4.2.1.44
- CAS no.: 37290-79-2

Databases
- IntEnz: IntEnz view
- BRENDA: BRENDA entry
- ExPASy: NiceZyme view
- KEGG: KEGG entry
- MetaCyc: metabolic pathway
- PRIAM: profile
- PDB structures: RCSB PDB PDBe PDBsum
- Gene Ontology: AmiGO / QuickGO
Search
- PMC: articles
- PubMed: articles
- NCBI: proteins

The enzyme myo-inosose-2 dehydratase (EC 4.2.1.44) catalyzes the chemical reaction

2,4,6/3,5-pentahydroxycyclohexanone $\rightleftharpoons$ 3,5/4-trihydroxycyclohexa-1,2-dione + H_{2}O

This enzyme belongs to the family of lyases, specifically the hydro-lyases, which cleave carbon-oxygen bonds. The systematic name of this enzyme class is 2,4,6/3,5-pentahydroxycyclohexanone hydro-lyase (3,5/4-trihydroxycyclohexa-1,2-dione-forming). Other names in common use include inosose 2,3-dehydratase, ketoinositol dehydratase, and 2,4,6/3,5-pentahydroxycyclohexanone hydro-lyase. This enzyme participates in inositol phosphate metabolism. It has 2 cofactors: manganese, and Cobalt.
