= ITPKA =

Protein-coding gene in the species Homo sapiens

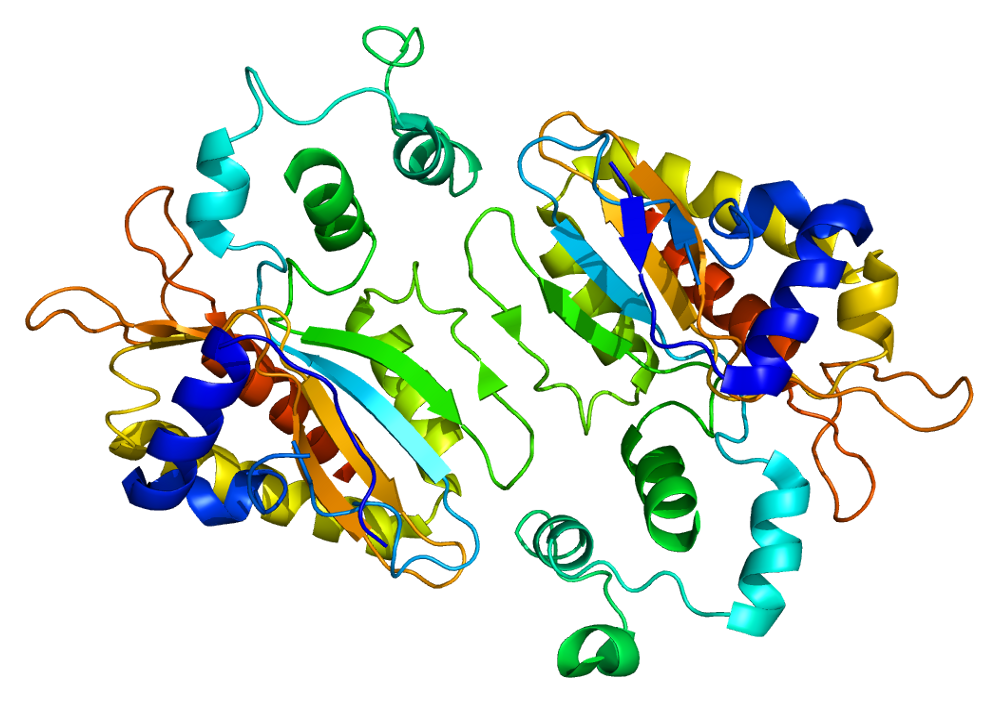

Identifiers
- Aliases: ITPKA, IP3-3KA, IP3KA, inositol-trisphosphate 3-kinase A
- External IDs: OMIM: 147521; MGI: 1333822; GeneCards: ITPKA
Available structures
PDB	Ortholog search: PDBe RCSB
PDB	List of PDB id codes 1W2C, 1W2D, 1W2F, 4UPU
Enzyme activity
EC #	BRENDA	ExPASy	KEGG	MetaCyc
2.7.1.127	↗	↗	↗	↗

Gene location (Human)
Chr.	Chromosome 15 (human)
Band	15q15.1	Start	41,493,393 bp
Band	15q15.1	End	41,503,551 bp

Gene location (Mouse)
Chr.	Chromosome 2 (mouse)
Band	2|2 E5	Start	119,572,818 bp
Band	2|2 E5	End	119,581,744 bp
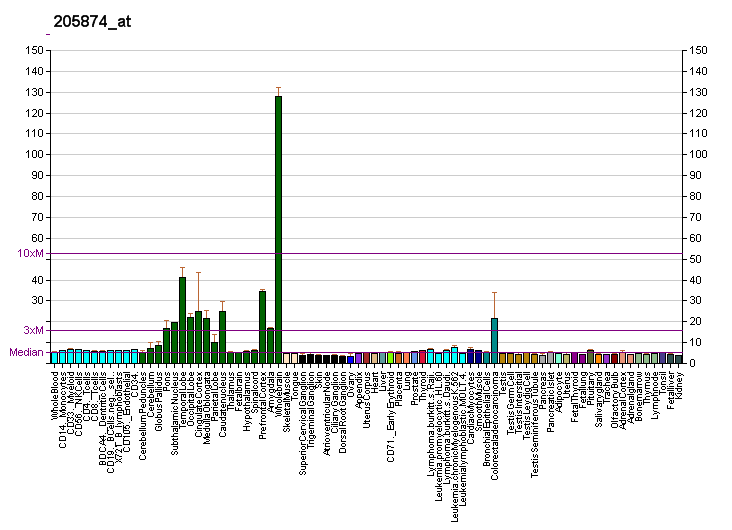
RNA expression pattern
Bgee	Human / Mouse (ortholog); Top expressed in: mucosa of transverse colon; right frontal lobe; Brodmann area 9; prefrontal cortex; middle temporal gyrus; caudate nucleus; putamen; cingulate gyrus; anterior cingulate cortex; nucleus accumbens / Top expressed in: Region I of hippocampus proper; hippocampus proper; primary visual cortex; prefrontal cortex; superior frontal gyrus; dentate gyrus of hippocampal formation granule cell; dorsal striatum; temporal lobe; nucleus accumbens; amygdala; More reference expression data
BioGPS	More reference expression data
Gene ontology
Molecular function	calmodulin-dependent protein kinase activity; transferase activity; nucleotide binding; inositol-1,4,5-trisphosphate 3-kinase activity; ATP binding; calmodulin binding; kinase activity
Cellular component	cytosol; dendritic spine
Biological process	dendritic spine maintenance; protein phosphorylation; inositol phosphate metabolic process; positive regulation of dendritic spine morphogenesis; actin cytoskeleton organization; inositol metabolic process; phosphorylation; signal transduction; regulation of synaptic plasticity; inositol phosphate biosynthetic process
Sources:Amigo / QuickGO
Orthologs
Databases	NCBI: entry; OMA: entry
Species	Human	Mouse
Entrez	3706	228550
Ensembl	ENSG00000137825	ENSMUSG00000027296
UniProt	P23677	Q8R071
RefSeq (mRNA)	NM_002220	NM_146125
RefSeq (protein)	NP_002211	NP_666237
Location (UCSC)	Chr 15: 41.49 – 41.5 Mb	Chr 2: 119.57 – 119.58 Mb
PubMed search
- Wikidata
View/Edit Human	View/Edit Mouse

Inositol-trisphosphate 3-kinase A is an enzyme that in humans is encoded by the ITPKA gene.

== Structure ==
ITPKA is one of three inositol-trisphosphate 3-kinase (ITP3K) genes in humans. ITP3K proteins regulate inositol phosphate metabolism by phosphorylation of the second messenger inositol 1,4,5-trisphosphate to produce Ins(1,3,4,5)P4, which is sometimes abbreviated as IP4. Structurally, ITPKA belongs to the inositol polyphosphate kinase (IPK) family. The activity of the inositol 1,4,5-trisphosphate 3-kinase is responsible for regulating the levels of a large number of inositol polyphosphates that are important in cellular signaling, most notably, inositol trisphosphate, which is the enzyme's only substrate. Both calcium/calmodulin and protein phosphorylation mechanisms control its activity. It is also a substrate for the cyclic AMP-dependent protein kinase, calcium/calmodulin- dependent protein kinase II, and protein kinase C in vitro. ITPKA and ITPKB are 68% identical in the C-terminus region The amino- terminal region of ITPKA binds filamentous actin. This property localizes the ITPKA to dendritic spines in principal neurons. ITPKA is expressed physiologically in neurons, but it is sometimes expressed in cancer cells and may contribute to processes of metastasis.

== Physiological function ==
ITPKA participates in learning and memory processes in neurons.

== Roles in human disease ==
Although ITPKA is expressed physiologically in neurons and testis, it sometimes becomes expressed in cancer cells, and the expression usually makes the cancer more aggressive.

== Relationship to F-tractin ==
F-tractin is amino acids 9-52 of rat ITPKA. It was later determined that amino acids 9-40 were sufficient for binding filamentous actin. When fused to a reporter, such as green fluorescent protein, It is useful for the visualization of actin dynamics in living cells.
