= Ira Tabas =

American molecular biologist

Ira Tabas is an American molecular biologist who currently serves as Richard J. Stock Professor and Vice-Chair of Research in the Department of Medicine, Professor of Anatomy & Cell Biology at Columbia University in the City of New York, and an endocrinologist affiliated with NewYork–Presbyterian Hospital .

== Biography ==
Tabas attended Washington University in St. Louis, Missouri, where he received his medical degree and his doctorate in biochemistry. While completing an internship and residency in internal medicine and a fellowship in endocrinology and metabolism at Columbia University Medical Center in New York City, he also conducted a postdoctoral fellowship in Alan Tall laboratory in the Department of Medicine at Columbia University. He began his independent scientific career as a Columbia faculty in 1985, and currently serves as Vice-Chair of Research in the Department of Medicine

== Research contributions ==
=== Cellular biology of advanced atherosclerotic plaque progression ===
A major research focus of Tabas is the molecular and cellular mechanisms and consequences resulting from macrophage apoptosis and from phagocytic clearance of apoptotic cells in advanced atherosclerotic lesions. One notable finding showed a critical link between the PERK / CHOP branch of the stress Unfolded protein response (UPR) and a calcium-induced apoptosis pathway, which involves an ER calcium-release channel IP3R, a calcium-sensitive protein kinase called CaMKII, and an oxidative stress-generating enzyme NADPH

Tabas developed nanoparticles that encapsulate and release an inflammation-resolving peptide drug. These nanomedicines can selectively home to tissue injury sites in mice, and release in a controlled manner over time.

=== Molecular mechanism linking insulin resistance to enhanced atherosclerosis ===
Tabas discovered a calcium-IP3R-CaMKII pathway plays a key role in glucagon-mediated excessive hepatic glucose production, insulin resistance, fatty liver, and dyslipidemia in the setting of obesity and type 2 diabetes.

== Awards and honors ==
- 1988 American Heart Association Established Investigator Award
- 1990 Columbia University Doctor Harold and Golden Lamport Research Award
- 2000 Richard J. Stock Professorship in the Department of Medicine of Columbia University
- 2011 Elected to Board of Reviewing Editors for Science
- 2014 Bonazinga award: "Presented annually to a Society of Leukocyte Biology member for excellence in leukocyte biology research. It is the highest honor the society can bestow upon one of its members and has been awarded annually since 1980."
