= Inositol-tetrakisphosphate 1-kinase =

Enzyme

inositol tetrakisphosphate 1-kinase

Identifiers
- EC no.: 2.7.1.134

Databases
- IntEnz: IntEnz view
- BRENDA: BRENDA entry
- ExPASy: NiceZyme view
- KEGG: KEGG entry
- MetaCyc: metabolic pathway
- PRIAM: profile
- PDB structures: RCSB PDB PDBe PDBsum
- Gene Ontology: AmiGO / QuickGO
Search
- PMC: articles
- PubMed: articles
- NCBI: proteins

In enzymology, an inositol-tetrakisphosphate 1-kinase (EC 2.7.1.134) is an enzyme that catalyzes the chemical reaction

ATP + 1D-myo-inositol 3,4,5,6-tetrakisphosphate $\rightleftharpoons$ ADP + 1D-myo-inositol 1,3,4,5,6-pentakisphosphate

Thus, the two substrates of this enzyme are ATP and 1D-myo-inositol 3,4,5,6-tetrakisphosphate, whereas its two products are ADP and 1D-myo-inositol 1,3,4,5,6-pentakisphosphate.

This enzyme belongs to the family of transferases, specifically those transferring phosphorus-containing groups (phosphotransferases) with an alcohol group as acceptor. The systematic name of this enzyme class is ATP:1D-myo-inositol-3,4,5,6-tetrakisphosphate 1-phosphotransferase. Other names in common use include 1D-myo-inositol-tetrakisphosphate 1-kinase, inositol-trisphosphate 6-kinase, 1D-myo-inositol-trisphosphate 6-kinase, ATP:1D-myo-inositol-1,3,4-trisphosphate 6-phosphotransferase, inositol-trisphosphate 5-kinase, 1D-myo-inositol-trisphosphate 5-kinase, and ATP:1D-myo-inositol-1,3,4-trisphosphate 5-phosphotransferase. This enzyme participates in inositol phosphate metabolism and phosphatidylinositol signaling system.

== Structural studies ==
As of late 2007, 3 structures have been solved for this class of enzymes, with PDB accession codes 2ODT, 2Q7D, and 2QB5.
