= Inositol-trisphosphate 3-kinase =

Class of enzymes

Inositol trisphosphate 3-kinase
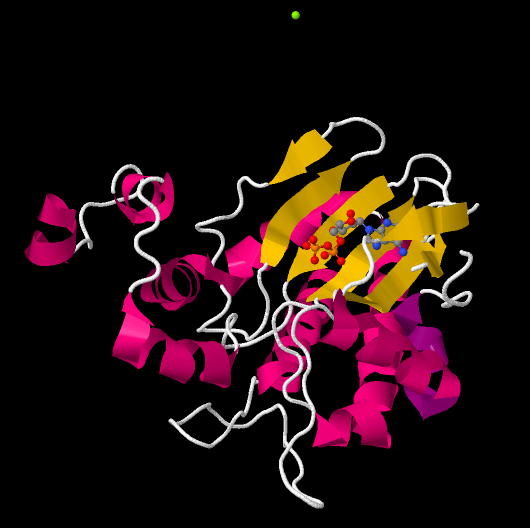
- Inositol-trisphosphate 3-kinase A Catalytic Core. 1TZD

Identifiers
- EC no.: 2.7.1.127
- CAS no.: 106283-10-7

Databases
- BRENDA: enzyme data
- ExPASy: NiceZyme view
- KEGG: enzyme entry
- MetaCyc: metabolic pathway
- Rhea: reactions
- PDB structures: RCSB PDB PDBe PDBsum
- Gene Ontology: AmiGO / QuickGO
Search
- PMC: articles
- PubMed: articles
- NCBI: proteins

Inositol (1,4,5) trisphosphate 3-kinase (EC 2.7.1.127), abbreviated here as ITP3K, is an enzyme that facilitates a phospho-group transfer from adenosine triphosphate to 1D-myo-inositol 1,4,5-trisphosphate. This enzyme belongs to the family of transferases, specifically those transferring phosphorus-containing groups (phosphotransferases) with an alcohol group as acceptor. The systematic name of this enzyme class is ATP:1D-myo-inositol-1,4,5-trisphosphate 3-phosphotransferase. ITP3K catalyzes the transfer of the gamma-phosphate from ATP to the 3-position of inositol 1,4,5-trisphosphate to form inositol 1,3,4,5-tetrakisphosphate. ITP3K is highly specific for the 1,4,5-isomer of IP_{3}, and it exclusively phosphorylates the 3-OH position, producing Ins(1,3,4,5)P4, also known as inositol tetrakisphosphate or IP4.

In biology, the enzyme ITP3K is abbreviated a number of different ways, including 1D-myo-inositol-trisphosphate 3-kinase, ITP3K, ITPK, IP3-kinase, IP3-3-kinase, Ins(1,4,5)P3 3-kinase. In addition the enzyme may be named as the product of one of 3 genes in humans ITPKA, ITPKB, and ITPKC, or one of two in fruit flies, IP3K1 and IP3K2—a mutant known to geneticists as wavy. The nematode genome has one form of the enzyme, coded by the LFE-2 gene. ITP3K enzymes are expressed only in metazoans; they are not expressed in yeast or plants.

All ITP3Ks belong to a larger structural family, the inositol polyphosphate kinases, or IPKs. Note however, that the human genome also contains a gene for a different kinase known as ITPK1, which is an inositol 1, 3, 4-trisphosphate 5/6-kinase and is not a member of the IPK family.

The ITP3K enzyme family is sometimes confused with a different enzyme family that has a similar name, that is, the phosphatidyl inositol 3-kinases or phosphoinositide 3-kinase (PI3-K), whose substrates are inositol lipids, not the soluble second messenger inositol trisphosphate.

== Discovery and characterization ==
Scientific interest in the inositol phosphates intensified in the years following the 1983 discovery that inositol trisphosphate was an intracellular messenger that releases calcium from intracellular stores in the endoplasmic reticulum. By the end of the decade, a large number of inositol phosphate kinases and phosphatases had been discovered, including ITP3K in 1986. Biochemical and molecular studies in the 1990s led to the purification of the enzyme from rat brain and it molecular cloning, and these studies revealed various feedback mechanisms by which the enzyme is regulated by calcium and protein kinases. In 1999, ITP3K was identified as being a member of a larger family of Inositol polyphosphate kinases, which share a similar structure and catalytic mechanism. ITP3K enzymes share common structural features including a conserved catalytic core which binds ATP located near the C-terminus, and various regulatory domains nearer to the N-terminus.

=== Catalytic domain ===
Evidence for this exquisite specificity and for the catalytic mechanism was found when the apo-enzyme, substrate-bound complex, and product-bound complex X-ray crystal structures of ITPKA were determined. The figure to the right depicts the catalytic mechanism, whereby the 3'OH of IP_{3} attacks the gamma-phosphate of ATP, and amino acid residues of ITPK important for stabilizing the substrates and products in the active site.

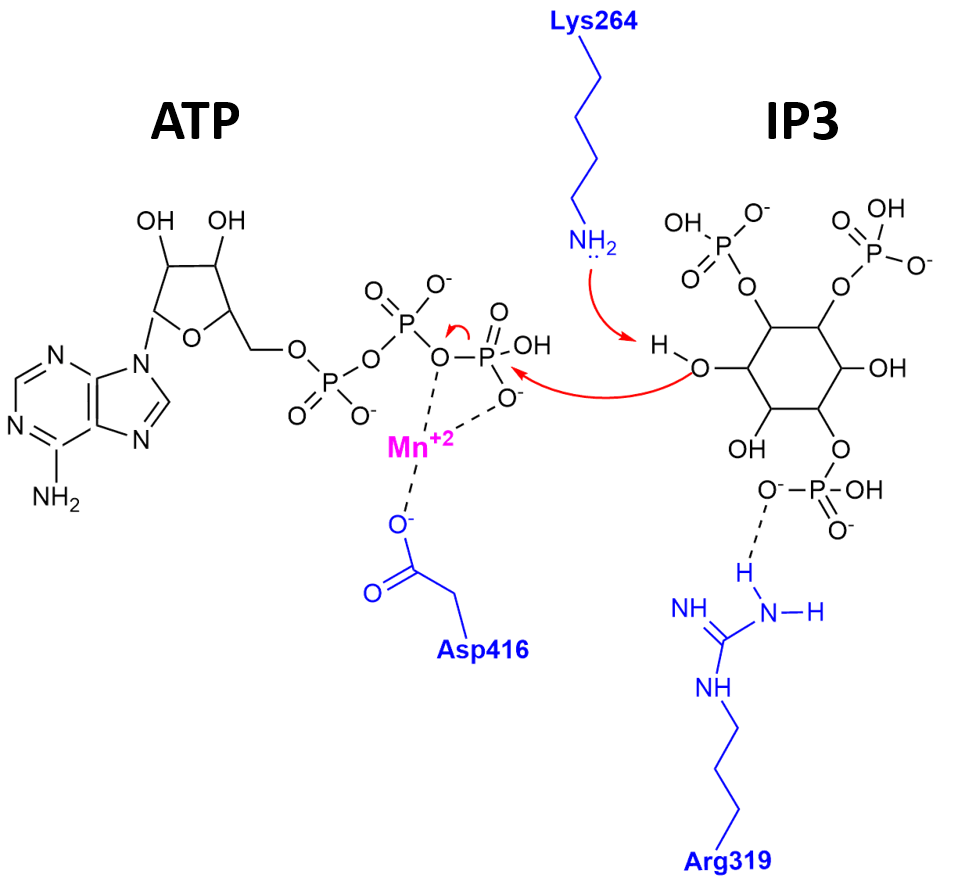
Phosphoryl Transfer Reaction Catalyzed by ITP3K. Hydrogen bonds are represented as dotted lines. Select ITP3K amino acids are shown in blue. Red arrows represent electron pushing. A metal cofactor (Mn2+, magenta) and a highly conserved Asp416 are essential for positioning the ATP beta- and gamma-phosphates. Arg319 (among other amino acids that are not shown) is involved in orienting IP_{3}. Lys264 is most likely involved in neutralizing the negative charge that develops on phosphate, and it may also serve as a general base (hydrogen acceptor) for the 3'OH of IP_{3}.

The structure of the catalytic domain of the human ITP3KA has been shown to be divided into three subdomains. These subdomains are displayed as the N lobe, which is a N-terminal domain, the C lobe, which is a C-terminal subdomain and a third alpha-only subdomain. The ITP3K catalytic domain varies somewhat from the protein kinase superfamily, and it has a novel four-helix substrate binding domain. In this kinase, the two domains are in an open conformation, which indicates that the two domains are both accessible at the same time. This suggests that substrate recognition and catalysis by ITP3K involves a dynamic conformational cycle. Additionally, this unique helical domain of ITPK blocks access to the active site by membrane-bound phosphoinositides, explaining the structural basis for soluble inositol polyphosphate specificity. Another feature of the catalytic core is the ATP binding site. Here, one molecule of ADP is bound in the cleft of the major domain, which indicates the active site of the kinase.

In further detail, the larger domain of the protein structure has an α/β-class structure. The domain has an N-terminal and a C-terminal lobe with a cleft in between and each of these lobes is built around an antiparallel β-sheet. In the N-terminal, the sheet has three strands, whereas in the C-terminal there is a five-stranded sheet. The second domain, is α-helical and consists of four α helices linked by long loops. The helices are loosely packed against each other and the entire domain is highly mobile as compared to the large α/β domain. The helical domain is juxtaposed against one end of the cleft in the large domain.

=== Regulation ===
ITP3K is regulated by various post-translational mechanisms. ITP3Ks are stimulated directly by calcium/calmodulin (Ca2+/CaM) binding. Generally, mammalian ITP3Ks are activated by calcium and calmodulin to varying degrees. The method in which this works is calmodulin recognizes sequences which contain amphiphilic alpha-helices with clusters of positively charged and hydrophobic amino acids. Certain sequences are required for CaM binding and enzyme activation and this level of stimulation appears to be specific to cell, tissue, or isoform. ITP3Ks from nematodes and Arabidopsis thaliana lack the CaM-binding sites and therefore are insensitive to calcium and calmodulin. Another major post-translational modification that is important for ITP3K regulation is phosphorylation. ITP3K activity is indirectly stimulated by phosphorylation by calcium/calmodulin-dependent kinase II (CaMKII). In addition, there is evidence that ITP3Ks may be activated upon phosphorylation by protein kinase C (PKC) and inhibited upon phosphorylation by protein kinase A (PKA).

=== Isoforms ===
There are three ITP3Ks which are encoded by the human genome: ITPKA, ITPKB, and ITPKC. All share a conserved C-terminal catalytic domain, but differ in mechanisms of regulation as well as tissue expression. ITPKA is predominant in neurons and in the testes. It is localized to dendritic spines by an association with filamentous actin which is consistent with its probable role in memory functions. ITPKB is expressed more widely, but it is often enriched in immune tissues, and it has different intracellular localizations that depend on tissue, interaction with actin filaments, and proteolysis at the N-terminal regions. ITPKC is also expressed in many different tissues and it is more enriched in the nucleus compared to the other isoforms.

== Functions in Calcium Signaling ==
ITP3K plays a role in regulating or cooperating with intracellular calcium signals that occur following the liberation of inositol trisphosphate. In this pathway, either a G-protein coupled receptor (GPCR) or receptor tyrosine kinase (RTK) is activated by an extracellular ligand-binding event. Initiation of the pathway leads to an activated G-alpha subunit of a heterotrimeric G protein (in the case of GPCR-mediated signal transduction) or autophoshorylation of RTK cytoplasmic domains (in the case of RTK-mediated signal transduction). These intracellular events eventually lead to activation of phospholipase C (PLC), which cleaves the phospholipid PIP_{2} into diacylglycerol (DAG) and inositol 1,4,5-trisphosphate (IP_{3}). DAG remains associated with the plasma membrane, while IP_{3} is released into the cytoplasm. IP_{3} then diffuses through the cytosol and binds to IP_{3} receptors on the endoplasmic reticulum or sarcoplasmic reticulum, resulting in the opening of a membrane channel and an influx of calcium ions into the cytoplasm. Calcium serves as a second messenger for various downstream cellular events including glycogen metabolism, muscle contraction, neurotransmitter release, and transcriptional regulation. Therefore, calcium homeostasis is essential for proper cell function and response to extracellular signals.

In order to prepare the cell for a future signaling event, the calcium pathway must be tightly regulated. ITP3K seems to play an important role in termination of the signal. As mentioned, ITP3K catalyzes the phosphorylation of IP_{3} to make IP_{4}. Unlike IP_{3}, IP_{4} does not cause opening of calcium channels on the endoplasmic reticulum or sarcoplasmic reticulum. By decreasing the concentration of IP_{3} in the cytoplasm, ITP3K terminates propagation of the calcium signaling pathway.

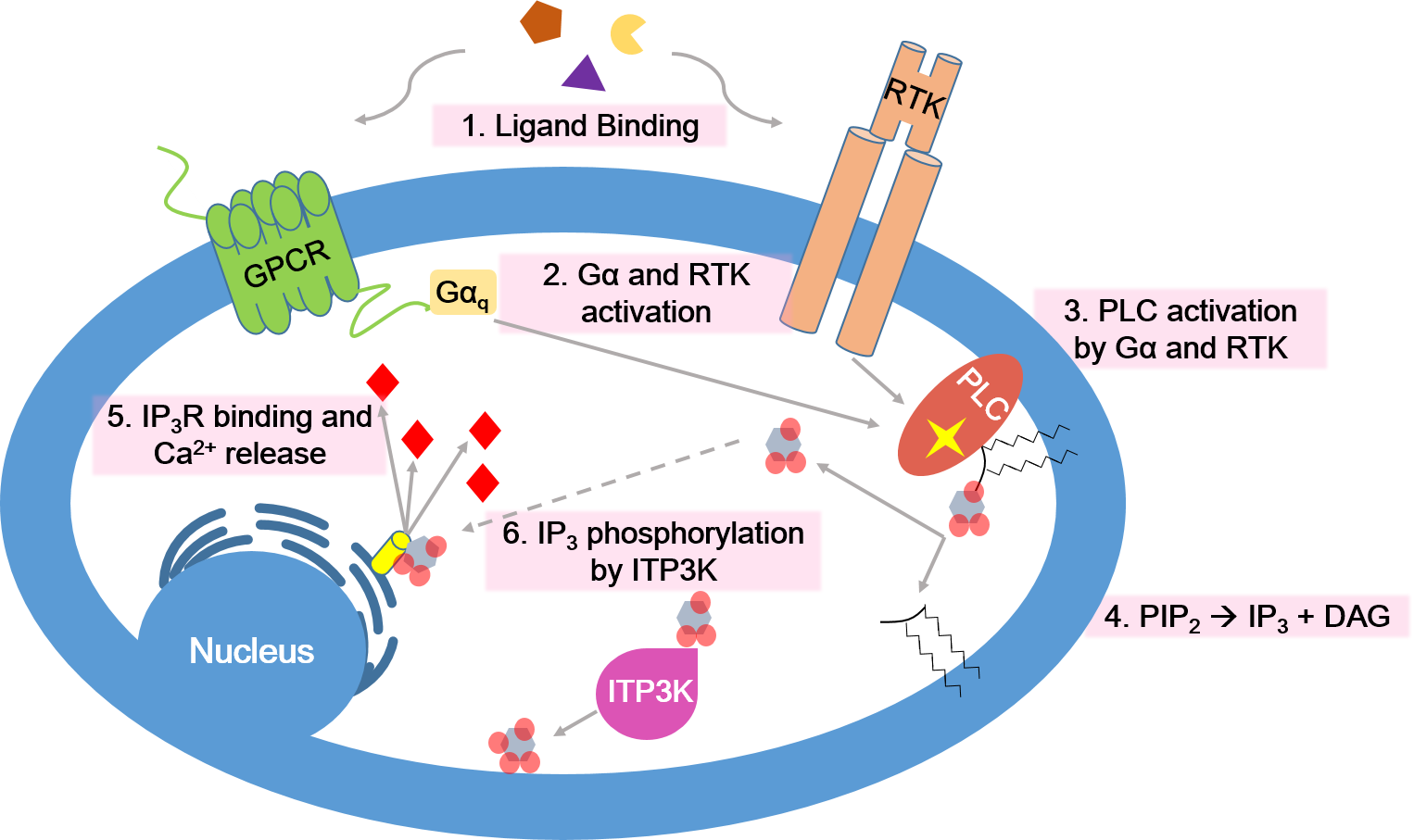
The calcium signaling pathway is involved in a variety of cellular processes including muscle contraction, gamete fertilization, and neurotransmitter release. Since the calcium second messenger has such widespread cellular functionality, it must be tightly regulated. ITP3K, shown in step 6 in the schematic, plays a role in calcium homeostasis by means of signal termination.

== Additional roles ==
ITP3K is not the only enzyme responsible for clearing IP_{3} from the cytoplasm. A second enzyme called inositol 5-phosphatase catalyzes the dephosphorylation of IP_{3} to create IP_{2}. Typically, nature does not favor the evolution of a second enzyme to perform an already-existing, identical function. A closer inspection of the evolutionary history of inositol 5-phosphatase and ITP3K gives rise to several interesting hypotheses about the roles of these enzymes in the cell.

Inositol 5-phosphatase existed before ITP3K evolved in the mammalian cell. Like other phosphatases, inositol 5-phosphatase is an energy-independent enzyme that cleaves a phosphate group off of a substrate. In contrast, ITP3K (like all kinases) is energy-dependent, meaning that it requires an ATP molecule to perform the phosphoryl transfer chemistry. If nature already had an energy-independent mechanism for termination of the calcium signaling pathway, why was the evolution of ITP3K advantageous? This apparent redundancy of function, or "waste" of energy by the cell, suggests that ITP3K may have a more important function in the cell than simply clearing the IP_{3} second messenger from the cytoplasm. Current hypotheses about additional roles for ITPK are explained in the following two subsections.

=== Product of ITPK may be a second messenger ===
As mentioned previously, ITP3K catalyzes a phosphoryl transfer reaction that converts IP_{3} to IP_{4}. IP_{4} does not stimulate calcium influx through IP_{3} receptor channels on the endoplasmic or sarcoplasmic reticulum. However, it has been shown that IP_{4} stimulates calcium channel opening on the plasma membrane. In this way, IP_{4} may actually serve to prolong the calcium signal by activating the influx of calcium stores from the extracellular space. In addition, there is evidence that IP_{4} binds two GTPase-activating proteins, GAP1IP4BP and GAP1m. GAPs are often used in signal transduction as on/off switches. IP_{4} binding to GAPs suggests that ITPK may be involved in a parallel signal transduction pathway. The exact role of IP_{4} binding to these GAPs has not been determined, though, so additional research in this area will be needed to gain a more complete understanding.

=== Role in inositol phosphate metabolism ===
In addition to its potential roles as a second messenger, IP_{4} may also function as an essential precursor for other more highly phosphorylated inositol phosphates such as IP_{5}, IP_{6}, IP_{7}, and IP_{8}. Such maintenance is necessary to prepare the cell for a future incoming signal.

=== Relevance to physiology and human disease ===
ITPKA protein is highly enriched in dendritic spines. ITPKA participates in learning and memory process in neuronal cells, both via its catalytic activity and its interaction with filamentous actin.

Although ITPKA is expressed physiologically in neurons and testis, the gene becomes expressed in a number of cancer cell types. In most cases, ITP3K expression causes the cancer to be more aggressive.

ITPKB is implicated in physiologic immune function.

ITPKC has been linked to Kawasaki Disease, an autoimmune disorder.
