= Inositol-tetrakisphosphate 5-kinase =

inositol tetrakisphosphate 5-kinase

Identifiers
- EC no.: 2.7.1.140
- CAS no.: 123940-40-9

Databases
- IntEnz: IntEnz view
- BRENDA: BRENDA entry
- ExPASy: NiceZyme view
- KEGG: KEGG entry
- MetaCyc: metabolic pathway
- PRIAM: profile
- PDB structures: RCSB PDB PDBe PDBsum
- Gene Ontology: AmiGO / QuickGO
Search
- PMC: articles
- PubMed: articles
- NCBI: proteins

In enzymology, an inositol-tetrakisphosphate 5-kinase (EC 2.7.1.140) is an enzyme that catalyzes the chemical reaction

ATP + 1D-myo-inositol 1,3,4,6-tetrakisphosphate $\rightleftharpoons$ ADP + 1D-myo-inositol 1,3,4,5,6-pentakisphosphate

Thus, the two substrates of this enzyme are ATP and 1D-myo-inositol 1,3,4,6-tetrakisphosphate, whereas its two products are ADP and 1D-myo-inositol 1,3,4,5,6-pentakisphosphate.

This enzyme belongs to the family of transferases, specifically those transferring phosphorus-containing groups (phosphotransferases) with an alcohol group as acceptor. The systematic name of this enzyme class is ATP:1D-myo-inositol-1,3,4,6-tetrakisphosphate 5-phosphotransferase. This enzyme is also called 1D-myo-inositol-tetrakisphosphate 5-kinase. This enzyme participates in inositol phosphate metabolism and phosphatidylinositol signaling system.
