= ITPR3 =

Protein-coding gene in the species Homo sapiens

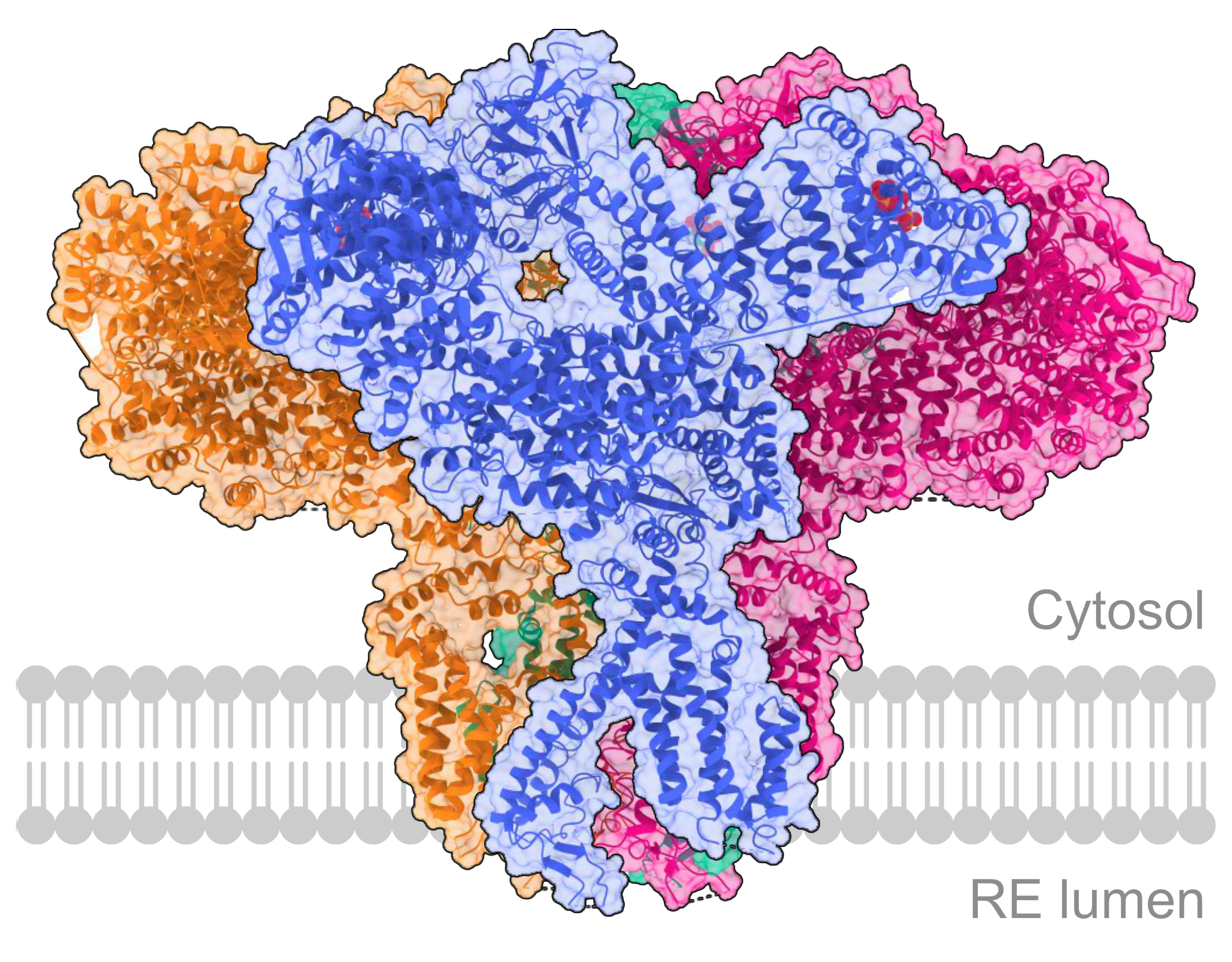

Identifiers
- Aliases: ITPR3, IP3R, IP3R3, inositol 1,4,5-trisphosphate receptor type 3
- External IDs: OMIM: 147267; MGI: 96624; GeneCards: ITPR3
Available structures
PDB	Ortholog search: PDBe RCSB
PDB	List of PDB id codes 3JRR

Gene location (Human)
Chr.	Chromosome 6 (human)
Band	6p21.31	Start	33,620,365 bp
Band	6p21.31	End	33,696,574 bp

Gene location (Mouse)
Chr.	Chromosome 17 (mouse)
Band	17 A3.3|17 13.68 cM	Start	27,276,278 bp
Band	17 A3.3|17 13.68 cM	End	27,341,197 bp
RNA expression pattern
Bgee	Human / Mouse (ortholog); Top expressed in: cartilage tissue; pylorus; skin of arm; trigeminal ganglion; sural nerve; skin of thigh; olfactory bulb; left lobe of thyroid gland; spinal ganglia; right lobe of thyroid gland / Top expressed in: molar; pyloric antrum; epithelium of stomach; skin of external ear; mucous cell of stomach; lip; epithelium of small intestine; sciatic nerve; rib; left colon; More reference expression data
BioGPS	n/a
Gene ontology
Molecular function	calcium channel activity; inositol 1,4,5-trisphosphate-sensitive calcium-release channel activity; ion channel activity; protein binding; inositol 1,3,4,5 tetrakisphosphate binding; calcium-release channel activity; inositol hexakisphosphate binding; inositol 1,4,5 trisphosphate binding; calcium ion binding; phosphatidylinositol binding
Cellular component	cytoplasm; integral component of membrane; endoplasmic reticulum membrane; membrane; receptor complex; plasma membrane; apical part of cell; integral component of plasma membrane; nucleoplasm; nucleolus; platelet dense tubular network membrane; endoplasmic reticulum; brush border; nucleus; nuclear outer membrane; myelin sheath; soma; sarcoplasmic reticulum; cytoplasmic vesicle membrane; secretory granule membrane
Biological process	sensory perception of umami taste; calcium ion transport into cytosol; regulation of cardiac conduction; regulation of insulin secretion; memory; ion transport; platelet activation; response to calcium ion; sensory perception of bitter taste; calcium ion transmembrane transport; transmembrane transport; sensory perception of sweet taste; inositol phosphate-mediated signaling; calcium ion transport; long-term potentiation; G protein-coupled receptor signaling pathway; positive regulation of cytosolic calcium ion concentration; protein homooligomerization; protein heterooligomerization; release of sequestered calcium ion into cytosol; transport
Sources:Amigo / QuickGO
Orthologs
Databases	NCBI: entry; OMA: entry
Species	Human	Mouse
Entrez	3710	16440
Ensembl	ENSG00000096433	ENSMUSG00000042644
UniProt	Q14573	P70227
RefSeq (mRNA)	NM_002224	NM_080553
RefSeq (protein)	NP_002215	NP_542120
Location (UCSC)	Chr 6: 33.62 – 33.7 Mb	Chr 17: 27.28 – 27.34 Mb
PubMed search
- Wikidata
View/Edit Human	View/Edit Mouse

Inositol 1,4,5-trisphosphate receptor, type 3, also known as ITPR3, is a protein which in humans is encoded by the ITPR3 gene. The protein encoded by this gene is both a receptor for inositol triphosphate and a calcium channel.

== Function ==
ITP3 channels serve an important role in the taste transduction pathway of sweet, bitter and umami tastes the gustatory system. ITP3 channels allow the flow of Calcium out of the endoplasmic reticulum in response to IP3. Calcium cations result in the activation of TRPM5 which leads to a depolarisation generating potential and an action potential.

== See also ==
- Inositol trisphosphate receptor
