= ITPR2 =

Protein-coding gene in humans

Identifiers
- Aliases: ITPR2, CFAP48, IP3R2, ANHD, INSP3R2, inositol 1,4,5-trisphosphate receptor type 2
- External IDs: OMIM: 600144; MGI: 99418; GeneCards: ITPR2

Gene location (Human)
Chr.	Chromosome 12 (human)
Band	12p11.23	Start	26,335,352 bp
Band	12p11.23	End	26,833,194 bp

Gene location (Mouse)
Chr.	Chromosome 6 (mouse)
Band	6 G3|6 77.7 cM	Start	146,009,797 bp
Band	6 G3|6 77.7 cM	End	146,403,721 bp
RNA expression pattern
Bgee	Human / Mouse (ortholog); Top expressed in: Achilles tendon; germinal epithelium; skin of thigh; epithelium of colon; skin of hip; sural nerve; liver; oral cavity; bone marrow cell; lactiferous duct / Top expressed in: Ileal epithelium; zygote; oocyte; primary oocyte; secondary oocyte; corneal stroma; thymus; blood; ankle joint; brown adipose tissue; More reference expression data
BioGPS	n/a
Gene ontology
Molecular function	calcium channel activity; calcium-release channel activity; calcium ion transmembrane transporter activity; ion channel activity; calcium ion binding; phosphatidylinositol binding; inositol 1,4,5-trisphosphate-sensitive calcium-release channel activity; scaffold protein binding; inositol 1,4,5 trisphosphate binding
Cellular component	cytoplasm; integral component of membrane; endoplasmic reticulum membrane; membrane; receptor complex; plasma membrane; sarcoplasmic reticulum; cell cortex; platelet dense tubular network membrane; sarcoplasmic reticulum membrane; nucleus; endoplasmic reticulum; cytoplasmic vesicle membrane; secretory granule membrane
Biological process	regulation of cardiac conduction; response to hypoxia; cellular response to ethanol; regulation of insulin secretion; ion transport; platelet activation; calcium ion transmembrane transport; transmembrane transport; inositol phosphate-mediated signaling; cellular response to cAMP; signal transduction; calcium ion transport; release of sequestered calcium ion into cytosol; transport
Sources:Amigo / QuickGO
Orthologs
Databases	NCBI: entry; OMA: entry
Species	Human	Mouse
Entrez	3709	16439
Ensembl	ENSG00000123104	ENSMUSG00000030287
UniProt	Q14571	Q9Z329
RefSeq (mRNA)	NM_002223	NM_010586; NM_019923
RefSeq (protein)	NP_002214	NP_034716; NP_064307
Location (UCSC)	Chr 12: 26.34 – 26.83 Mb	Chr 6: 146.01 – 146.4 Mb
PubMed search
- Wikidata
View/Edit Human	View/Edit Mouse

Inositol 1,4,5-trisphosphate receptor, type 2, also known as ITPR2, is a protein which in humans is encoded by the ITPR2 gene. The protein encoded by this gene is both a receptor for inositol triphosphate and a calcium channel.

== See also ==
- Inositol trisphosphate receptor
