= Adenophostin =

Adenophostin A
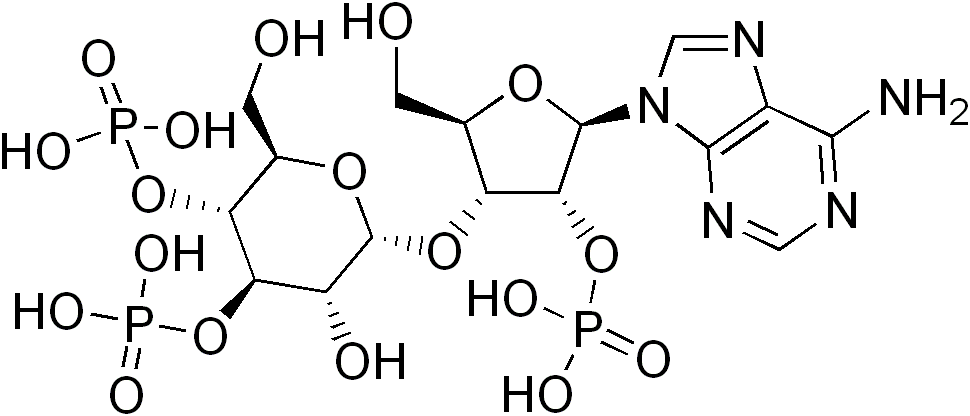

Names
- IUPAC name [(2R,3R,4R,5R)-2-(6-Amino-9-purinyl)-4-[[(2R,3R,4R,5R,6R)-3-hydroxy-6-(hydroxymethyl)-4,5-diphosphonooxy-2-tetrahydropyranyl]oxy]-5-(hydroxymethyl)-3-tetrahydrofuranyl] dihydrogen phosphate

Identifiers
CAS Number	149091-92-9
3D model (JSmol)	Interactive image
ChEMBL	ChEMBL204385
ChemSpider	110268
IUPHAR/BPS	4124
PubChem CID	123695
UNII	2S7AR5SVD7
CompTox Dashboard (EPA)	DTXSID10164167
- InChI: InChI=1S/C16H26N5O18P3/c17-13-7-14(19-3-18-13)21(4-20-7)15-12(39-42(31,32)33)9(5(1-22)34-15)36-16-8(24)11(38-41(28,29)30)10(6(2-23)35-16)37-40(25,26)27/h3-6,8-12,15-16,22-24H,1-2H2,(H2,17,18,19)(H2,25,26,27)(H2,28,29,30)(H2,31,32,33)/t5-,6-,8-,9-,10-,11-,12-,15-,16-/m1/s1 Key: RENVITLQVBEFDT-MZQFDOALSA-N; InChI=1/C16H26N5O18P3/c17-13-7-14(19-3-18-13)21(4-20-7)15-12(39-42(31,32)33)9(5(1-22)34-15)36-16-8(24)11(38-41(28,29)30)10(6(2-23)35-16)37-40(25,26)27/h3-6,8-12,15-16,22-24H,1-2H2,(H2,17,18,19)(H2,25,26,27)(H2,28,29,30)(H2,31,32,33)/t5-,6-,8-,9-,10-,11-,12-,15-,16-/m1/s1 Key: RENVITLQVBEFDT-MZQFDOALBO
- SMILES: O=P(O)(O)O[C@@H]4[C@H](O[C@H]1O[C@@H]([C@@H](OP(=O)(O)O)[C@H](OP(=O)(O)O)[C@H]1O)CO)[C@H](O[C@H]4n2c3ncnc(N)c3nc2)CO

Properties
Chemical formula	C_{16}H_{26}N_{5}O_{18}P_{3}
Molar mass	669.32 g/mol
- Except where otherwise noted, data are given for materials in their standard state (at 25 °C [77 °F], 100 kPa). verify (what is ?) Infobox references

Adenophostin A is a potent inositol trisphosphate (IP_{3}) receptor agonist, but is much more potent than IP_{3}.

IP_{3}R is a ligand-gated intracellular Ca^{2+} release channel that plays a central role in modulating cytoplasmic free Ca^{2+} concentration (Ca^{2+}i). Adenophostin A is structurally different from IP_{3} but could elicit distinct calcium signals in cells.
