= F-tractin =

F-Tractin is a cellular probe for filamentous actin. It consists of a portion of the amino terminal actin binding region of the rat protein ITPKA, usually fused to a reporter such as green fluorescent protein. Initial studies determined that amino acids 9-52 from the rat ITPKA were useful as a live-cell reporter for actin filaments. Later studies determined that amino acids 9-40 were sufficient for F-actin binding. F-Tractin is one of a number of F-actin probes useful in live cell imaging.
