= NMDA receptor synaptonuclear signaling and neuronal migration factor =

Protein-coding gene in the species Homo sapiens

NSMF

Identifiers
- Aliases: NSMF, HH9, NELF, Nasal embryonic LHRH factor, NMDA receptor synaptonuclear signaling and neuronal migration factor
- External IDs: OMIM: 608137; MGI: 1861755; HomoloGene: 10648; GeneCards: NSMF; OMA:NSMF - orthologs

Gene location (Human)
Chr.	Chromosome 9 (human)
Band	9q34.3	Start	137,447,570 bp
Band	9q34.3	End	137,459,334 bp

Gene location (Mouse)
Chr.	Chromosome 2 (mouse)
Band	2|2 A3	Start	24,944,367 bp
Band	2|2 A3	End	24,952,893 bp
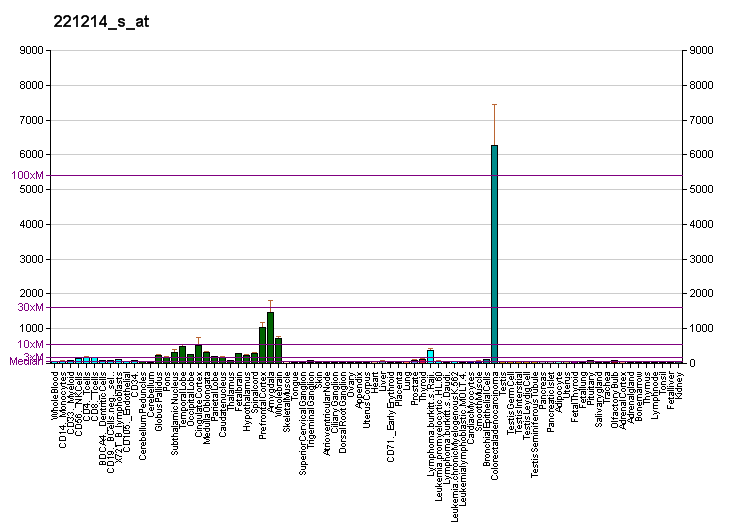
RNA expression pattern
Bgee	Human / Mouse (ortholog); Top expressed in: anterior cingulate cortex; right frontal lobe; amygdala; prefrontal cortex; Region I of hippocampus proper; ascending aorta; dorsolateral prefrontal cortex; caudate nucleus; Descending thoracic aorta; nucleus accumbens / Top expressed in: medial dorsal nucleus; medial geniculate nucleus; lateral geniculate nucleus; subiculum; anterior amygdaloid area; barrel cortex; suprachiasmatic nucleus; substantia nigra; olfactory tubercle; prefrontal cortex; More reference expression data
BioGPS	More reference expression data
Gene ontology
Molecular function	calcium-dependent protein binding
Cellular component	cytoplasm; apical dendrite; perikaryon; postsynaptic membrane; cell projection; nuclear membrane; nuclear envelope; membrane; postsynaptic density; nuclear matrix; cortical cytoskeleton; plasma membrane; synapse; nucleoplasm; cell junction; dendrite; cell cortex; neuron projection; cytoskeleton; nucleus
Biological process	positive regulation of protein dephosphorylation; regulation of neuron apoptotic process; positive regulation of neuron migration; regulation of dendrite morphogenesis; cellular response to amino acid stimulus; cellular response to gonadotropin stimulus; cellular response to electrical stimulus; regulation of neuron migration; regulation of neuronal synaptic plasticity
Sources:Amigo / QuickGO
Orthologs
Species	Human	Mouse
Entrez	26012	56876
Ensembl	ENSG00000165802	ENSMUSG00000006476
UniProt	Q6X4W1	Q99NF2
RefSeq (mRNA)	NM_001130969; NM_001130970; NM_001130971; NM_001178064; NM_015537	NM_001039386; NM_001039387; NM_001177654; NM_001177655; NM_020276
RefSeq (protein)	NP_001124441; NP_001124442; NP_001124443; NP_001171535; NP_056352	NP_001034475; NP_001034476; NP_001171125; NP_001171126; NP_064672
Location (UCSC)	Chr 9: 137.45 – 137.46 Mb	Chr 2: 24.94 – 24.95 Mb
PubMed search
- Wikidata
View/Edit Human	View/Edit Mouse

NMDA receptor synaptonuclear signaling and neuronal migration factor (NSMF), also known as Nasal embryonic luteinizing hormone-releasing hormone factor (NELF), is a protein that in humans is encoded by the NSMF gene.
