= Mabel Hokin =

English biochemist

Mabel R. Hokin
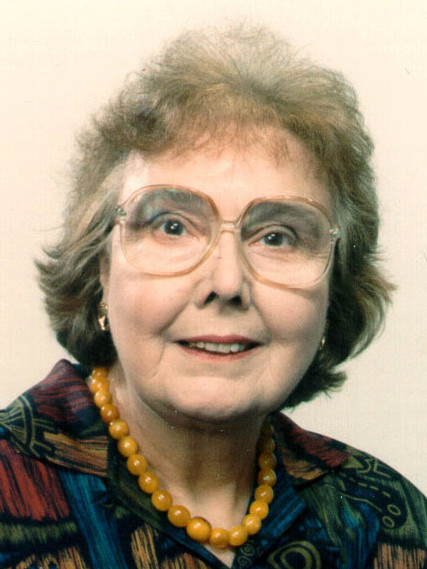
- Born: 9 February 1924; Sheffield, England, UK
- Died: 17 August 2003 (aged 79); Madison, Wisconsin, USA
- Other names: Mabel Ruth Neaverson; Mabel Davison; Mabel Hokin-Neaverson (post-1971 publications)
- Citizenship: British
- Education: University of Sheffield
- Known for: Discovery of the phosphoinositide effect
- Spouse(s): Dennis Davison (m. 1946; d. 1952); Lowell Hokin (m. 1953; d. 1971; three children) Bernard Biales (m. 2003)
- Scientific career
- Fields: Biochemistry, Neurochemistry
- Workplaces: McGill University; University of Wisconsin
- Doctoral advisor: Quentin Gibson

Mabel Ruth Hokin (9 February 1924 – 17 August 2003) was a biochemist who spent most of her professional career conducting fundamental research in the University of Wisconsin Medical School. She is most well known for the work she did early in her career, along with then-husband Lowell Hokin, in the study of stimulated phosphoinositide turnover in secretory tissues, a key component of transmembrane signaling and many other cell regulatory processes which became known as the 'PI Effect'.

== Early life ==
Mabel Ruth Neaverson was born to working-class parents in the Heeley district of Sheffield, England in early 1924. She had two younger sisters, Mary and Dorothy. Mabel took to academic pursuits at an early age, excelling in elementary and grammar school as well as at bible scholarship. She spent 1942 to 1943 working in the Women's Land Army, where, among other things, she helped administer a refugee camp for Czech Jews. (Mabel converted to Judaism ten years later.)

She also became interested in costume design and theater, where she met her first husband, actor and playwright Dennis Davison.

Mabel worked as a technician in the Medical Research Council Unit for Research in Cell Metabolism under Hans Krebs at the University of Sheffield from 1943 to 1946, and enrolled as a student in 1946, continuing to work for Krebs. Krebs recognized Mabel's scientific mind and talent in the laboratory, and urged her to pursue doctoral work, which she began in 1949 after receiving her Bachelor of Science Honors degree in physiology. She did her graduate research under Quentin Gibson in the Physiology department. In a short time, Mabel met Krebs' graduate student Lowell Hokin, and the two began a romantic as well as professional relationship. Mabel received her Ph.D. in 1952.

== Scientific career ==
Mabel and Lowell Hokin conducted research in fundamental biochemistry together from their doctoral research days in Sheffield, to their work at McGill University in the 1950s, up to the mid-1960s at the University of Wisconsin. From the mid-1960s, Mabel worked in her own areas of research with a particular focus on neurochemistry after she received a primary appointment in the Department of Psychiatry along with a joint appointment in the Department of Physiological Chemistry in the University of Wisconsin Medical School.

Mabel and Lowell's most significant work came very early in their careers, and was first published in their seminal 1953 paper in the Journal of Biological Chemistry. In it, Mabel and Lowell described experiments in which they stimulated enzyme secretion in slices of pigeon pancreas in the presence of media containing the radioisotope P^{32}. They found that the phospholipid fraction from the stimulated slices, formerly thought to contain fairly inert structural components of cell membranes, contained up to 9 times as much P^{32} as it did in the non-stimulated control samples. In a 1955 paper Lowell and Mabel showed that the bulk of the P^{32} went into phosphatidate and 'a phosphoinositide' that was later identified as phosphatidylinositol (PtdIns). They then showed that this metabolic response, which became known as the 'PI effect', occurred in a variety of stimulated tissues, such as pigeon pancreas (1958), suggesting that it plays a widespread role in cell regulation. Mabel and Lowell summarized their cell membrane biochemistry research in a 1965 article in Scientific American. In 1974, Mabel provided some of the first experimental evidence that launched the modern phase of work in this area (she published as M. Hokin-Neaverson after her 1971 divorce from Lowell).

In the 1970s, Mabel became interested in the biochemistry of the brain, or neurochemistry, and, as a full professor, led the Laboratory for Neurochemistry Research in the Department of Psychiatry in the University of Wisconsin Medical School, which was conveniently located in the same building as the physiological chemistry, pharmacology, and anatomy departments, where her colleagues worked and from which she drew graduate students. She delved into undergraduate teaching at one point, teaching a course on drugs and the mind in the early 1970s, but her primary teaching activity was guiding graduate students and teaching graduate biochemistry courses. Unlike her earlier research, which exclusively employed animal tissues, Mabel also studied blood samples from humans, including mentally ill patients, and contributed to the understanding of the biochemical basis of mental illness, showing the first biochemical marker for one of the major psychoses. Mabel's assistant, Ken Sadeghian, worked with her from the 1960s until her retirement.

Interest in the PI effect waned in the 1960s and 1970s, but experienced a resurgence in the 1980s due to advances in technology and understanding of cell membrane biochemistry. Mabel and Lowell became regarded as founders of an important and still growing field of biochemistry and cell biology — the many roles of inositol phospholipids in cell function — for which they were honored at a 1996 symposium at the University of Wisconsin that gathered their colleagues from around the world. Their early work was highlighted in a 20th anniversary review of the discovery of inositol-1,4,5-trisphosphate as a second messenger, and their 1953 and 1958 JBC articles were celebrated as "JBC Classics" in 2005.

== Personal life ==
Most of Mabel's life was spent under a shadow cast by autoimmune illness. At the age of 16 she was diagnosed with lupus and given a dire prognosis for longevity. It turned out, however, to be a nonfatal autoimmune connective tissue disease with which Mabel struggled for the rest of her life. In the mid-1960s, treatment with steroids became established, and Mabel's steroid treatment led to degradation of her hip joints. She was an early recipient of artificial hips at Mayo Clinic in 1972.

Mabel and Lowell had hoped to move to the United States after finishing their doctoral work in Sheffield, but Mabel's earlier activities as chair of the Sheffield University Socialist Society and member, along with then-husband Dennis Davison, of the Communist Party of Great Britain, led to her being blacklisted from entry into the United States during the McCarthy Era. Instead, Mabel and Lowell obtained positions at the Montreal General Hospital Research Institute at McGill University in 1953. While conducting research at McGill they petitioned the United States government to allow Mabel entry into the U.S., but it was not until 1957 that they were able to move to their new jobs in Wisconsin. From their arrival in Montreal in 1953 to their departure in 1957, Mabel was unable to attend any research conferences in the United States.

Wisconsin was chosen for several reasons: Lowell received a junior faculty appointment in the Department of Physiological Chemistry, Mabel obtained a position in the department that allowed her to continue her research with Lowell, and Lowell's parents lived close by in Peoria, Illinois.

Mabel had three children. In 1966 the family moved to a home on Lake Mendota, where Mabel lived for the rest of her life.

Mabel and Lowell were divorced in 1971.

In 1986, Mabel and Bernard Biales, who had worked in her lab at one time, began a relationship that lasted until her death. They married in hospice on 22 July 2003.

Mabel Hokin died in Madison on 17 August 2003.
