= Inositol pentakisphosphate =

myo-Inositol 1,3,4,5,6-pentakisphosphate
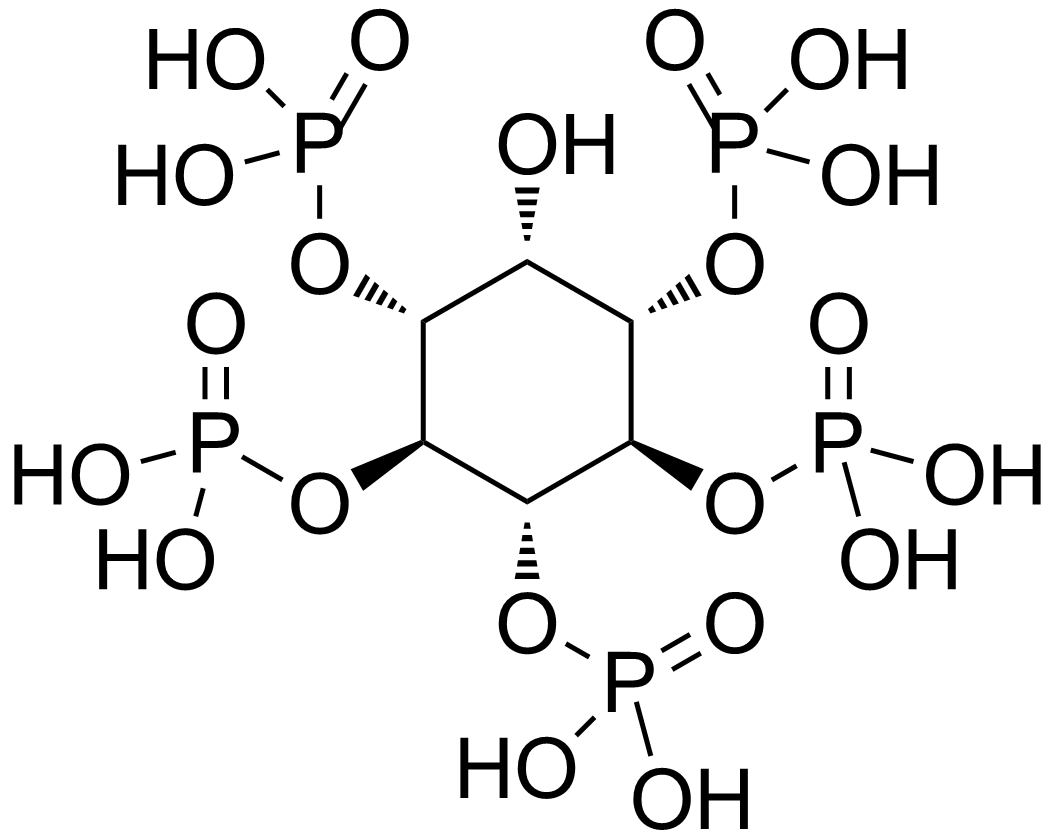

Identifiers
CAS Number	20298-95-7
3D model (JSmol)	Interactive image
Beilstein Reference	7685231
ChEBI	CHEBI:57733
ChemSpider	19951265
KEGG	C15991
PubChem CID	482
UNII	8444PN9XUW
- InChI: InChI=1S/C6H17O21P5/c7-1-2(23-28(8,9)10)4(25-30(14,15)16)6(27-32(20,21)22)5(26-31(17,18)19)3(1)24-29(11,12)13/h1-7H,(H2,8,9,10)(H2,11,12,13)(H2,14,15,16)(H2,17,18,19)(H2,20,21,22)/p-10/t1-,2+,3-,4-,5+,6+ Key: CTPQAXVNYGZUAJ-KXXVROSKSA-D; InChI=1/C6H17O21P5/c7-1-2(23-28(8,9)10)4(25-30(14,15)16)6(27-32(20,21)22)5(26-31(17,18)19)3(1)24-29(11,12)13/h1-7H,(H2,8,9,10)(H2,11,12,13)(H2,14,15,16)(H2,17,18,19)(H2,20,21,22)/p-10/t1-,2+,3-,4-,5+,6+ Key: CTPQAXVNYGZUAJ-JSZKNSOJBF
- SMILES: O=P([O-])([O-])O[C@@H]1[C@@H](OP([O-])([O-])=O)[C@H](OP([O-])([O-])=O)[C@H](O)[C@H](OP([O-])([O-])=O)[C@H]1OP([O-])([O-])=O

Properties
Chemical formula	C_{6}H_{17}O_{21}P_{5}
Molar mass	580.050 g·mol^{−1}
- Except where otherwise noted, data are given for materials in their standard state (at 25 °C [77 °F], 100 kPa). verify (what is ?) Infobox references

Inositol pentakisphosphate (abbreviated IP5) is a molecule derived from inositol tetrakisphosphate by adding a phosphate group with the help of Inositol-polyphosphate multikinase (IPMK). It is believed to be one of the many second messengers in the inositol phosphate family. It "is implicated in a wide array of biological and pathophysiological responses, including tumorigenesis, invasion and metastasis, therefore specific inhibitors of the kinase may prove useful in cancer therapy."

IP5 also plays a role in defense signaling in plants. It potentiates the interaction of the plant hormone JA-Ile by its receptor.
