= Inositol-polyphosphate multikinase =

Class of enzymes

Identifiers
- EC no.: 2.7.1.151
- CAS no.: 9077-69-4

Databases
- BRENDA: enzyme data
- ExPASy: NiceZyme view
- KEGG: enzyme entry
- MetaCyc: metabolic pathway
- Rhea: reactions
- PDB structures: RCSB PDB PDBe PDBsum
Search
- PMC: articles
- PubMed: articles
- NCBI: proteins

IPMK

Identifiers
- Aliases: IPMK, inositol polyphosphate multikinase
- External IDs: OMIM: 609851; MGI: 1916968; GeneCards: IPMK
Enzyme activity
| EC # | BRENDA | ExPASy | KEGG | MetaCyc |
|---|---|---|---|---|
| 2.7.1.140 | ↗ | ↗ | ↗ | ↗ |
| 2.7.1.151 | ↗ | ↗ | ↗ | ↗ |
| 2.7.1.153 | ↗ | ↗ | ↗ | ↗ |

Gene location (Human)
| Chr. | Chromosome 10 (human) |
| Band | 10q21.1 | Start | 58,191,517 bp |
| Band | 10q21.1 | End | 58,267,894 bp |

Gene location (Mouse)
| Chr. | Chromosome 10 (mouse) |
| Band | 10|10 B5.3 | Start | 71,183,593 bp |
| Band | 10|10 B5.3 | End | 71,269,157 bp |
RNA expression pattern
| Bgee | Human / Mouse (ortholog); Top expressed in: buccal mucosa cell; amniotic fluid; pancreatic epithelial cell; monocyte; skin of arm; mucosa of paranasal sinus; right lobe of liver; gingival epithelium; epithelium of nasopharynx; nasal epithelium / Top expressed in: zygote; retinal pigment epithelium; secondary oocyte; ileum; jejunum; left colon; epithelium of small intestine; Paneth cell; primary oocyte; hand; More reference expression data |
| BioGPS | n/a |
Gene ontology
| Molecular function | transferase activity; nucleotide binding; inositol-1,4,5-trisphosphate 6-kinase activity; ATP binding; kinase activity; inositol tetrakisphosphate 5-kinase activity; inositol tetrakisphosphate 6-kinase activity; inositol tetrakisphosphate 3-kinase activity; inositol-1,4,5-trisphosphate 3-kinase activity; flavonoid binding; myo-inositol-1,2,3,4,6-heptakisphosphate 5-kinase activity; metal ion binding |
| Cellular component | nucleolus; nucleus; nucleoplasm |
| Biological process | inositol phosphate metabolic process; phosphorylation; inositol phosphate biosynthetic process; necroptosis; inositol trisphosphate metabolic process; lipid metabolism; phosphatidylinositol metabolic process |
Sources:Amigo / QuickGO
Orthologs
| Databases | NCBI: entry; OMA: entry |
| Species | Human | Mouse |
| Entrez | 253430 | 69718 |
| Ensembl | ENSG00000151151 | ENSMUSG00000060733 |
| UniProt | Q8NFU5 | Q7TT16 |
| RefSeq (mRNA) | NM_152230 | NM_027184; NM_001347191 |
| RefSeq (protein) | NP_689416 | NP_001334120; NP_081460 |
| Location (UCSC) | Chr 10: 58.19 – 58.27 Mb | Chr 10: 71.18 – 71.27 Mb |
| PubMed search |
- Wikidata
| View/Edit Human | View/Edit Mouse |

Inositol-polyphosphate multikinase (EC 2.7.1.151, IpK2, IP3/IP4 6-/3-kinase, IP3/IP4 dual-specificity 6-/3-kinase, IpmK, ArgRIII, AtIpk2alpha, AtIpk2beta, inositol polyphosphate 6-/3-/5-kinase) is an enzyme that in humans is encoded by the gene IPMK. Its systematic name is ATP:1D-myo-inositol-1,4,5-trisphosphate 6-phosphotransferase. This enzyme catalyses the following chemical reaction

2 ATP + 1D-myo-inositol 1,4,5-trisphosphate $\rightleftharpoons$ 2 ADP + 1D-myo-inositol 1,3,4,5,6-pentakisphosphate (overall reaction)
(1a) ATP + 1D-myo-inositol 1,4,5-trisphosphate $\rightleftharpoons$ ADP + 1D-myo-inositol 1,4,5,6-tetrakisphosphate
(1b) ATP + 1D-myo-inositol 1,4,5,6-tetrakisphosphate $\rightleftharpoons$ ADP + 1D-myo-inositol 1,3,4,5,6-pentakisphosphate

This enzyme also phosphorylates Ins(1,4,5)P3 to Ins(1,3,4,5)P4, Ins(1,3,4,5)P4 to Ins(1,3,4,5,6)P5, and Ins(1,3,4,5,6)P4 to Ins(PP)P4, isomer unknown.
