= Inositol-pentakisphosphate 2-kinase =

Identifiers
- EC no.: 2.7.1.158

Databases
- BRENDA: enzyme data
- ExPASy: NiceZyme view
- KEGG: enzyme entry
- MetaCyc: metabolic pathway
- Rhea: reactions
- PDB structures: RCSB PDB PDBe PDBsum
Search
- PMC: articles
- PubMed: articles
- NCBI: proteins

In enzymology, an inositol-pentakisphosphate 2-kinase (EC 2.7.1.158) is an enzyme that catalyzes the chemical reaction

ATP + 1D-myo-inositol 1,3,4,5,6-pentakisphosphate $\rightleftharpoons$ ADP + 1D-myo-inositol hexakisphosphate

Thus, the two substrates of this enzyme are ATP and 1D-myo-inositol 1,3,4,5,6-pentakisphosphate, whereas its two products are ADP and 1D-myo-inositol hexakisphosphate.

This enzyme belongs to the family of transferases, specifically those transferring phosphorus-containing groups (phosphotransferases) with an alcohol group as acceptor. The systematic name of this enzyme class is ATP:1D-myo-inositol 1,3,4,5,6-pentakisphosphate 2-phosphotransferase. Other names in common use include IP5 2-kinase, Gsl1p, Ipk1p, inositol polyphosphate kinase, inositol 1,3,4,5,6-pentakisphosphate 2-kinase, and Ins(1,3,4,5,6)P5 2-kinase.
