= Inositol trisphosphate =

1D-myo-inositol 1,4,5-trisphosphate
- The inositol trisphosphate trianion

Names
- IUPAC name [(1R,2S,3R,4R,5S,6R)-2,3,5-trihydroxy-4,6-diphosphonooxycyclohexyl] dihydrogen phosphate
- Other names IP_{3}; Triphosphoinositol; Inositol 1,4,5-trisphosphate

Identifiers
CAS Number	85166-31-0
3D model (JSmol)	Interactive image
ChemSpider	388562
IUPHAR/BPS	4222
PubChem CID	439456
UNII	MU34XVK5NR
- InChI: InChI=1S/C6H15O15P3/c7-1-2(8)5(20-23(13,14)15)6(21-24(16,17)18)3(9)4(1)19-22(10,11)12/h1-9H,(H2,10,11,12)(H2,13,14,15)(H2,16,17,18)/t1-,2+,3+,4-,5-,6-/m1/s1 Key: MMWCIQZXVOZEGG-XJTPDSDZSA-N; InChI=1/C6H15O15P3/c7-1-2(8)5(20-23(13,14)15)6(21-24(16,17)18)3(9)4(1)19-22(10,11)12/h1-9H,(H2,10,11,12)(H2,13,14,15)(H2,16,17,18)/t1-,2+,3+,4-,5-,6-/m1/s1 Key: MMWCIQZXVOZEGG-XJTPDSDZBF
- SMILES: [C@H]1([C@@H]([C@H]([C@@H]([C@H]([C@@H]1OP(=O)(O)O)O)OP(=O)(O)O)OP(=O)(O)O)O)O

Properties
Chemical formula	C_{6}H_{15}O_{15}P_{3}
Molar mass	420.096 g/mol
- Except where otherwise noted, data are given for materials in their standard state (at 25 °C [77 °F], 100 kPa). Infobox references

Inositol trisphosphate or inositol 1,4,5-trisphosphate abbreviated InsP_{3} or Ins3P or IP_{3} is an inositol phosphate signaling molecule. It is made by hydrolysis of phosphatidylinositol 4,5-bisphosphate (PIP_{2}), a phospholipid that is located in the plasma membrane, by phospholipase C (PLC). Together with diacylglycerol (DAG), IP_{3} is a second messenger molecule used in signal transduction in biological cells. While DAG stays inside the membrane, IP_{3} is soluble and diffuses through the cell, where it binds to its receptor, which is a calcium channel located in the endoplasmic reticulum. When IP_{3} binds its receptor, calcium is released into the cytosol, thereby activating various calcium regulated intracellular signals.

== Properties ==
=== Chemical formula and molecular weight ===
IP_{3} is an organic molecule with a molecular mass of 420.10 g/mol. Its empirical formula is C_{6}H_{15}O_{15}P_{3}. It is composed of an inositol ring with three phosphate groups bound at the 1, 4, and 5 carbon positions, and three hydroxyl groups bound at positions 2, 3, and 6.

=== Chemical properties ===
Phosphate groups can exist in three different forms depending on a solution's pH. Phosphorus atoms can bind three oxygen atoms with single bonds and a fourth oxygen atom using a double/dative bond. The pH of the solution, and thus the form of the phosphate group determines its ability to bind to other molecules. The binding of phosphate groups to the inositol ring is accomplished by phosphor-ester binding (see phosphoric acids and phosphates). This bond involves combining a hydroxyl group from the inositol ring and a free phosphate group through a dehydration reaction. Considering that the average physiological pH is approximately 7.4, the main form of the phosphate groups bound to the inositol ring in vivo is PO_{4}^{2−}. This gives IP_{3} a net negative charge, which is important in allowing it to dock to its receptor, through binding of the phosphate groups to positively charged residues on the receptor. IP_{3} has three hydrogen bond donors in the form of its three hydroxyl groups. The hydroxyl group on the 6th carbon atom in the inositol ring is also involved in IP_{3} docking.

=== Binding to its receptor ===
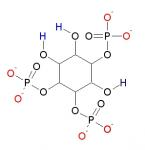
IP_{3} anion with oxygen atoms (red) and the hydrogen atoms involved in docking to InsP3R (dark blue) indicated

The docking of IP_{3} to its receptor, which is called the inositol trisphosphate receptor (InsP3R), was first studied using deletion mutagenesis in the early 1990s. Studies focused on the N-terminus side of the IP_{3} receptor. In 1997 researchers localized the region of the IP_{3} receptor involved with binding of IP_{3} to between amino acid residues 226 and 578 in 1997. Considering that IP_{3} is a negatively charged molecule, positively charged amino acids such as arginine and lysine were believed to be involved. Two arginine residues at position 265 and 511 and one lysine residue at position 508 were found to be key in IP_{3} docking. Using a modified form of IP_{3}, it was discovered that all three phosphate groups interact with the receptor, but not equally. Phosphates at the 4th and 5th positions interact more extensively than the phosphate at the 1st position and the hydroxyl group at the 6th position of the inositol ring.

== Discovery ==
The discovery that a hormone can influence phosphoinositide metabolism was made by Mabel R. Hokin (1924–2003) and her husband Lowell E. Hokin in 1953, when they discovered that radioactive ^{32}P phosphate was incorporated into the phosphatidylinositol of pancreas slices when stimulated with acetylcholine. Up until then phospholipids were believed to be inert structures only used by cells as building blocks for construction of the plasma membrane.

Over the next 20 years, little was discovered about the importance of PIP_{2} metabolism in terms of cell signaling, until the mid-1970s when Robert H. Michell hypothesized a connection between the catabolism of PIP_{2} and increases in intracellular calcium (Ca^{2+}) levels. He hypothesized that receptor-activated hydrolysis of PIP_{2} produced a molecule that caused increases in intracellular calcium mobilization. This idea was researched extensively by Michell and his colleagues, who in 1981 were able to show that PIP_{2} is hydrolyzed into DAG and IP_{3} by a then unknown phosphodiesterase. In 1984 it was discovered that IP_{3} acts as a secondary messenger that is capable of traveling through the cytoplasm to the endoplasmic reticulum (ER), where it stimulates the release of calcium into the cytoplasm.

Further research provided valuable information on the IP_{3} pathway, such as the discovery in 1986 that one of the many roles of the calcium released by IP_{3} is to work with DAG to activate protein kinase C (PKC). It was discovered in 1989 that phospholipase C (PLC) is the phosphodiesterase responsible for hydrolyzing PIP_{2} into DAG and IP_{3}. Today the IP_{3} signaling pathway is well mapped out, and is known to be important in regulating a variety of calcium-dependent cell signaling pathways.

== Signaling pathway ==
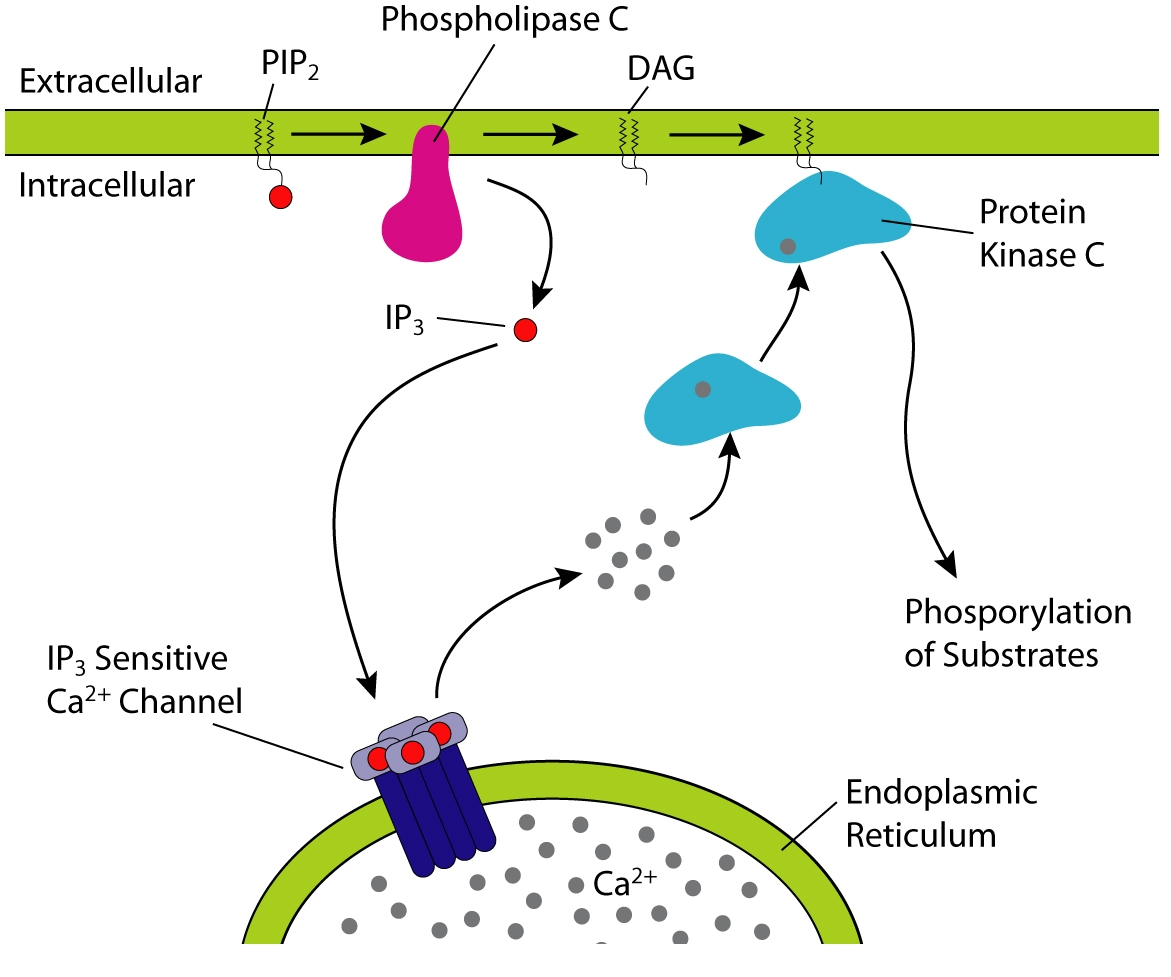
PLC cleavage of PIP_{2} to IP_{3} and DAG initiates intracellular calcium release and PKC activation.

Increases in the intracellular Ca^{2+} concentrations are often a result of IP_{3} activation. When a ligand binds to a G protein-coupled receptor (GPCR) that is coupled to a Gq heterotrimeric G protein, the α-subunit of Gq can bind to and induce activity in the PLC isozyme PLC-β, which results in the cleavage of PIP_{2} into IP_{3} and DAG.

If a receptor tyrosine kinase (RTK) is involved in activating the pathway, the isozyme PLC-γ has tyrosine residues that can become phosphorylated upon activation of an RTK, and this will activate PLC-γ and allow it to cleave PIP_{2} into DAG and IP_{3}. This occurs in cells that are capable of responding to growth factors such as insulin, because the growth factors are the ligands responsible for activating the RTK.

IP_{3} (also abbreviated Ins(1,4,5)P_{3} is a soluble molecule and is capable of diffusing through the cytoplasm to the ER, or the sarcoplasmic reticulum (SR) in the case of muscle cells, once it has been produced by the action of PLC. Once at the ER, IP_{3} is able to bind to the Ins(1,4,5)P_{3} receptor Ins(1,4,5)P_{3}R which is a ligand-gated Ca^{2+} channel that is found on the surface of the ER. The binding of IP_{3} (the ligand in this case) to Ins(1,4,5)P_{3}R triggers the opening of the Ca^{2+} channel, and thus release of Ca^{2+} into the cytoplasm. In heart muscle cells this increase in Ca^{2+} activates the ryanodine receptor-operated channel on the SR, results in further increases in Ca^{2+} through a process known as calcium-induced calcium release. IP_{3} may also activate Ca^{2+} channels on the cell membrane indirectly, by increasing the intracellular Ca^{2+} concentration.

== Function ==
=== Human ===
IP_{3}'s main functions are to mobilize Ca^{2+} from storage organelles and to regulate cell proliferation and other cellular reactions that require free calcium. In smooth muscle cells, for example, an increase in concentration of cytoplasmic Ca^{2+} results in the contraction of the muscle cell.

In the nervous system, IP_{3} serves as a second messenger, with the cerebellum containing the highest concentration of IP_{3} receptors. There is evidence that IP_{3} receptors play an important role in the induction of plasticity in cerebellar Purkinje cells.

=== Sea urchin eggs ===
The slow block to polyspermy in the sea urchin is mediated by the PIP_{2} secondary messenger system. Activation of the binding receptors activates PLC, which cleaves PIP_{2} in the egg plasma membrane, releasing IP_{3} into the egg cell cytoplasm. IP_{3} diffuses to the ER, where it opens Ca^{2+} channels.

== Research ==
=== Huntington's disease ===
Huntington's disease occurs when the cytosolic protein Huntingtin (Htt) has an additional 35 glutamine residues added to its amino terminal region. This modified form of Htt is called Htt^{exp}. Htt^{exp} makes Type 1 IP_{3} receptors more sensitive to IP_{3}, which leads to the release of too much Ca^{2+} from the ER. The release of Ca^{2+} from the ER causes an increase in the cytosolic and mitochondrial concentrations of Ca^{2+}. This increase in Ca^{2+} is thought to be the cause of GABAergic MSN degradation.

=== Alzheimer's disease ===
Alzheimer's disease involves the progressive degeneration of the brain, severely impacting mental faculties. Since the Ca^{2+} hypothesis of Alzheimer's was proposed in 1994, several studies have shown that disruptions in Ca^{2+} signaling are the primary cause of Alzheimer's disease. Familial Alzheimer's disease has been strongly linked to mutations in the presenilin 1 (PS1), presenilin 2 (PS2), and amyloid precursor protein (APP) genes. All of the mutated forms of these genes observed to date have been found to cause abnormal Ca^{2+} signaling in the ER. Mutations in PS1 have been shown to increase IP_{3}-mediated Ca^{2+} release from the ER in several animal models. Calcium channel blockers have been used to treat Alzheimer's disease with some success, and the use of lithium to decrease IP_{3} turnover has also been suggested as a possible method of treatment.

== See also ==
- Adenophostin
- Inositol
- Inositol phosphate
- myo-Inositol
- Myo-inositol trispyrophosphate
- Inositol pentakisphosphate
- Inositol hexaphosphate
- Inositol trisphosphate receptor
- ITPR1
- ITPKC
