= Inositol trisphosphate receptor =

Class of transport proteins

inositol 1,4,5-trisphosphate receptor, type 1
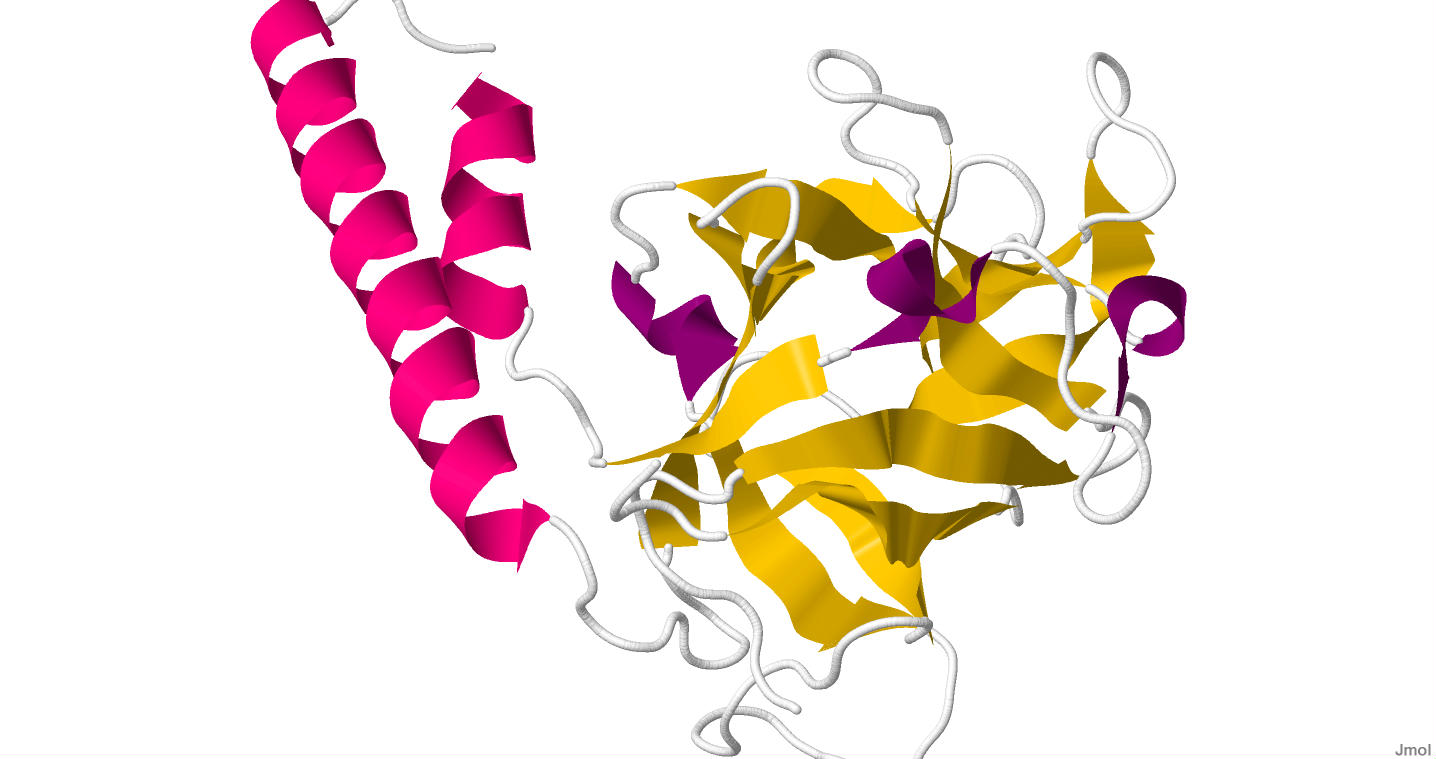
- Crystal structure of the ligand binding suppressor domain of type 1 inositol 1,4,5-trisphosphate receptor

Identifiers
- Symbol: ITPR1
- NCBI gene: 3708
- HGNC: 6180
- OMIM: 147265
- RefSeq: NM_002222
- UniProt: Q14643

Other data
- Locus: Chr. 3 p26.1
Search for
- Structures: Swiss-model
- Domains: InterPro

inositol 1,4,5-trisphosphate receptor, type 2

Identifiers
- Symbol: ITPR2
- NCBI gene: 3709
- HGNC: structure of the ligand binding suppressor domain of type 1 inositol 1,4,5-trisphosphate receptor 6181 Crystal structure of the ligand binding suppressor domain of type 1 inositol 1,4,5-trisphosphate receptor 6181
- OMIM: 600144
- RefSeq: NM_002223
- UniProt: Q14571

Other data
- Locus: Chr. 12 p11.23
Search for
- Structures: Swiss-model
- Domains: InterPro

inositol 1,4,5-trisphosphate receptor, type 3
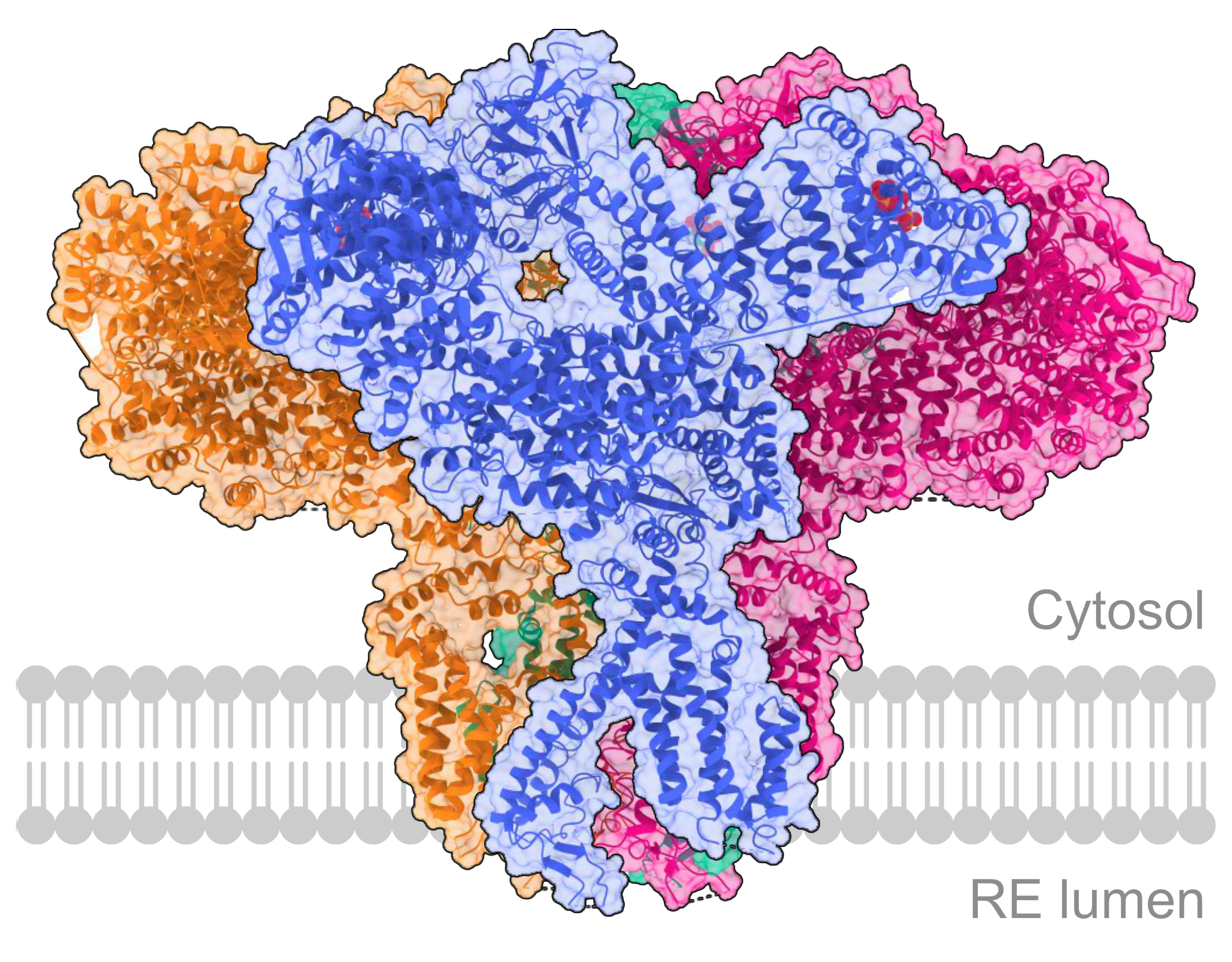
- Single-particle cryo-EM structure of the IP3-bound resting state.

Identifiers
- Symbol: ITPR3
- NCBI gene: 3710
- HGNC: 6182
- OMIM: 147267
- RefSeq: NM_002224
- UniProt: Q14573

Other data
- Locus: Chr. 6 p21.31
Search for
- Structures: Swiss-model
- Domains: InterPro

Inositol trisphosphate receptor (InsP3R, IP_{3}R) is a membrane glycoprotein complex acting as a Ca^{2+} channel activated by inositol trisphosphate (InsP3, IP_{3}). InsP3R is very diverse among organisms, and is necessary for the control of cellular and physiological processes including cell division, cell proliferation, apoptosis, fertilization, development, behavior, learning and memory. Inositol triphosphate receptor represents a dominant second messenger leading to the release of Ca^{2+} from intracellular store sites. There is strong evidence suggesting that the InsP3R plays an important role in the conversion of external stimuli to intracellular Ca^{2+} signals characterized by complex patterns relative to both space and time, such as Ca^{2+} waves and oscillations.

== Discovery ==
The InsP3 receptor was first purified from rat cerebellum by neuroscientists Surachai Supattapone and Solomon Snyder at Johns Hopkins School of Medicine.

The cDNA of the InsP3 receptor was first cloned in the laboratory of Katsuhiko Mikoshiba. The initial sequencing was reported as an unknown protein enriched in the cerebellum called P400. The large size of this open reading frame indicated a molecular weight similar to the protein purified biochemically, and soon thereafter it was confirmed that the protein P400 was in fact the inositol trisphosphate receptor.

== Distribution ==
The receptor has a broad tissue distribution but is especially abundant in the cerebellum. Most of the InsP3Rs are found integrated into the endoplasmic reticulum.

== Structure ==
Using X-ray crystallography and cryo-electron microscopy (cryo-EM) several protein structures of IP_{3}Rs were obtained from mouse, rat, and human. Those structures helped to define the overall architecture of the channel. The 1.2 MDa C_{4}-symmetric assembly consists of an ER-embedded transmembrane domain (TMD) in a domain-swapped 6 transmembrane (6TM) cation channel fold that is capped by a large cytosolic domain (CD). In this manner, IP_{3}Rs share significant homology with the much larger and distantly-related ryanodine receptors. The CD contains all known ligand binding sites, including the IP_{3} binding site, two Ca^{2+} binding sites, an adenine nucleotide binding site, and a C_{2}H_{2} Zn^{2+} finger fold. A comprehensive Ca^{2+}-dependent conformational landscape has been defined by cryo-EM.

== See also ==
- Inositol
- Inositol phosphate
  - Inositol monophosphate
  - Inositol trisphosphate
  - Inositol pentakisphosphate
  - Inositol hexaphosphate
- MRVI1 associated through complex formation.
