= Inositol phosphate =

Class of chemical compounds

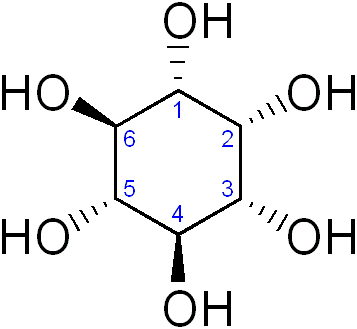
Inositol

Phosphate group

Inositol phosphates are a group of mono- to hexaphosphorylated inositols. Each form of inositol phosphate is distinguished by the number and position of the phosphate group on the inositol ring.

- inositol monophosphate (IP or IP_{1})
- inositol bisphosphate (IP_{2})
- inositol trisphosphate (IP_{3})
- inositol tetrakisphosphate (IP_{4})
- inositol pentakisphosphate (IP_{5})
- inositol hexaphosphate (IP_{6}) also known as phytic acid, or phytate (as a salt).

A series of phosphorylation and dephosphorylation reactions are carried out by at least 19 phosphoinositide kinases and 28 phosphoinositide phosphatase enzymes allowing for the inter-conversion between the inositol phosphate compounds based on cellular demand.

Inositol phosphates play a crucial role in various signal transduction pathways responsible for cell growth and differentiation, apoptosis, DNA repair, RNA export, regeneration of ATP and more.

== Functions ==
=== Inositol trisphosphate ===
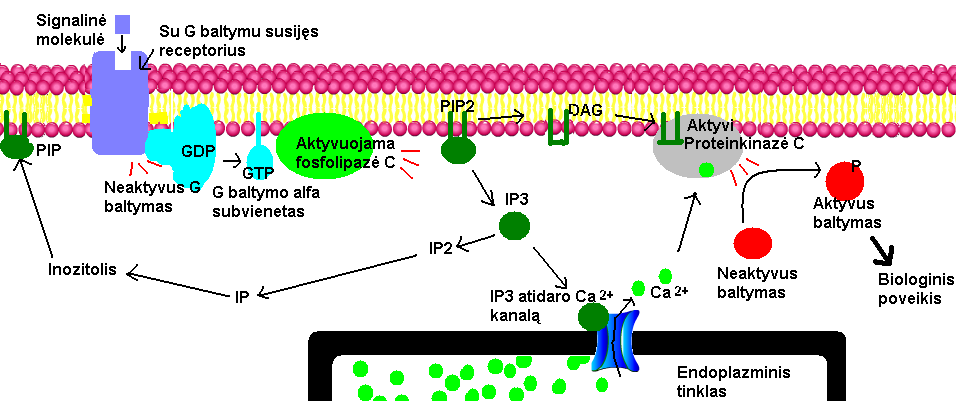
inositol-phospholipid signaling pathway

The inositol-phospholipid signaling pathway is responsible for the generation of IP3 through the cleavage of phosphatidylinositol 4,5-bisphosphate (PIP_{2}) found in the lipid bi-layer of the plasma membrane by phospholipase C in response to either receptor tyrosine kinase or Gq alpha subunit-G protein-coupled receptor signaling. Soluble inositol trisphosphate (IP_{3}) is able to rapidly diffuse into the cytosol and bind to the inositol trisphosphate receptor (InsP3Rs) calcium channels located in the endoplasmic reticulum. This releases calcium into the cytosol, serving as a rapid and potent signal for various cellular processes.

Further reading: Function of calcium in humans

=== Other ===
Inositol tetra-, penta-, and hexa-phosphates have been implicated in gene expression.

=== Inositol hexaphosphate ===
Inositol hexaphosphate (IP_{6}, phytic acid) is the most abundant inositol phosphate isomer found. IP_{6} is solely involved in various biological activities such as neurotransmission, immune response, regulation of kinase and phosphatase proteins as well as activation of calcium channels. IP_{6} is also involved in ATP regeneration seen in plants as well as insulin exocytosis in pancreatic β cells.

Inositol hexaphosphate also facilitates the formation of the six-helix bundle and assembly of the immature HIV-1 Gag lattice. IP_{6} makes ionic contacts with two rings of lysine residues at the centre of the Gag hexamer. Proteolytic cleavage then unmasks an alternative binding site, where IP_{6} interaction promotes the assembly of the mature capsid lattice. These studies identify IP_{6} as a naturally occurring small molecule that promotes both assembly and maturation of HIV-1.
