= UTP18 =

Protein-coding gene in the species Homo sapiens

Identifiers
- Aliases: UTP18, CGI-48, WDR50, small subunit processome component, UTP18 small subunit processome component
- External IDs: OMIM: 612816; MGI: 1923402; GeneCards: UTP18

Gene location (Human)
Chr.	Chromosome 17 (human)
Band	17q21.33	Start	51,260,546 bp
Band	17q21.33	End	51,297,936 bp

Gene location (Mouse)
Chr.	Chromosome 11 (mouse)
Band	11|11 D	Start	93,750,069 bp
Band	11|11 D	End	93,776,592 bp
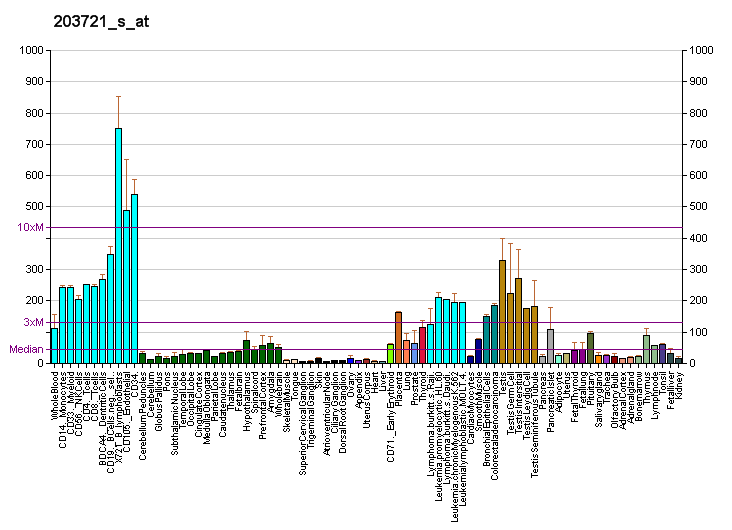
RNA expression pattern
Bgee	Human / Mouse (ortholog); Top expressed in: right testis; left testis; sperm; gonad; Achilles tendon; cartilage tissue; gingival epithelium; tibia; visceral pleura; germinal epithelium / Top expressed in: primitive streak; spermatocyte; epiblast; primary oocyte; spermatid; hair follicle; endothelial cell of lymphatic vessel; embryo; abdominal wall; secondary oocyte; More reference expression data
BioGPS	More reference expression data
Gene ontology
Molecular function	RNA binding
Cellular component	Pwp2p-containing subcomplex of 90S preribosome; small-subunit processome; nucleolus; nucleus; nucleoplasm; nuclear membrane
Biological process	maturation of SSU-rRNA from tricistronic rRNA transcript (SSU-rRNA, 5.8S rRNA, LSU-rRNA); rRNA processing
Sources:Amigo / QuickGO
Orthologs
Databases	NCBI: entry; OMA: entry
Species	Human	Mouse
Entrez	51096	217109
Ensembl	ENSG00000011260	ENSMUSG00000054079
UniProt	Q9Y5J1	Q5SSI6
RefSeq (mRNA)	NM_016001	NM_001013375
RefSeq (protein)	NP_057085	NP_001013393
Location (UCSC)	Chr 17: 51.26 – 51.3 Mb	Chr 11: 93.75 – 93.78 Mb
PubMed search
- Wikidata
View/Edit Human	View/Edit Mouse

U3 small nucleolar RNA-associated protein 18 homolog is a protein that in humans is encoded by the UTP18 gene.

== See also ==
- Fibrillarin
- Small nucleolar RNA U3
- RCL1
- RRP9
- UTP11L
- UTP14A
- UTP15
