= C8orf34 =

Protein-coding gene found in humans

Identifiers
- Aliases: C8orf34, VEST-1, VEST1, chromosome 8 open reading frame 34
- External IDs: MGI: 2444149; GeneCards: C8orf34

Gene location (Mouse)
Chr.	Chromosome 1 (mouse)
Band	1|1 A2	Start	11,414,105 bp
Band	1|1 A2	End	11,975,901 bp
Orthologs
Databases	NCBI: entry; OMA: entry
Species	Human	Mouse
Entrez	116328	320492
Ensembl	ENSG00000165084	ENSMUSG00000057715
UniProt	Q49A92	Q8BZJ8
RefSeq (mRNA)	NM_001195639; NM_052958	NM_001160369; NM_001160370; NM_001160371; NM_177173; NM_001310451 NM_001374633; NM_001374634
RefSeq (protein)	NP_001182568; NP_443190; NP_001336405; NP_001336406; NP_001336407 NP_001336408; NP_001336409	NP_001153841; NP_001153842; NP_001153843; NP_001297380; NP_796147 NP_001361562; NP_001361563; NP_001387218; NP_001387220
Location (UCSC)	n/a	Chr 1: 11.41 – 11.98 Mb
PubMed search
- Wikidata
View/Edit Human	View/Edit Mouse

Uncharacterized protein C8orf34, also called vestibule 1, is a protein that in humans is encoded by the gene C8orf34. Within the cell, C8orf34 is localized to the nucleus and nucleoli where it may play a role in the regulation of gene expression as well as the cell cycle.

== Gene ==
The C8orf34 gene is located on the positive-sense strand of chromosome 8 at locus 8q13.2. On the NCBI genome assembly GRCh38.p12, it spans from 68330373 to 68819023. It is 635 kbp in length and contains 14 exons. Among the seven possible transcripts for C8orf34, the longest is 2452 base pairs, encoding for 538 amino acids.

Location of C8orf34 on human chromosome 8.

=== Gene neighbors ===
Several gene loci lie near the C8orf34 gene along chromosome 8. While many of these are non-functional pseudogenes, a few of these gene neighbors are functional and protein-coding. The nearest protein-encoding gene to C8orf34 is PREX2, a guanine-nucleotide exchange factor for the Rac family of G proteins. This protein is involved in insulin signalling pathways. Mutations in and overexpression of the PREX2 gene have been observed in some cancers.

Gene neighbors and areas of interest
Gene	Location	Function	NCBI Gene ID
PREX2	67951918...68237033	facilitates the exchange of GDP for GTP on Rac1 (a GTPase)	80243
LOC105375888	68082051...68095535	uncharacterized	105375888
LOC107986951	68849606...68858076	uncharacterized	107986951
LOC108004543	68973432...68976574	non-coding, known to undergo non-allelic homologous recombination (NAHR) with another region	108004543

=== Gene expression ===
Within the cell, C8orf34 is expressed primarily in the nucleus. C8orf34 protein lacks a signal peptide to allow it to sort outside of the nuclear membrane or to other organelles. An analysis via PSORT II concluded that C8orf34 is localized to the nucleus 94.1% reliability. This nuclear localization suggests that C8orf34 protein may have a function related to the expression and regulation of genes in the nucleus. Alternatively, it may be involved in the maintenance and protection of the cell's genetic material.

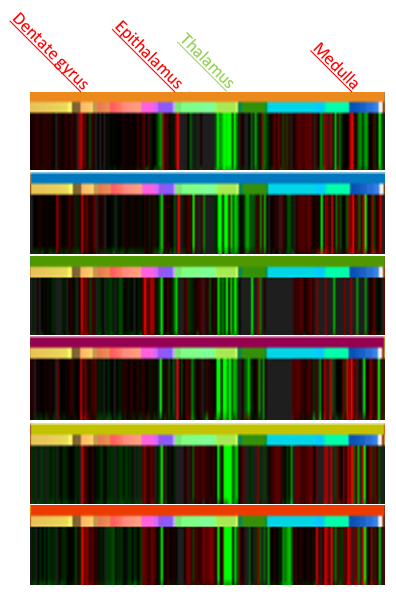
Microarray data from 6 individuals showing the expression of C8orf34 in different regions of the brain. Areas of high expression are shown in red while areas of low expression are noted in green.

C8orf34 is expressed in a wide array of tissues, including the kidney, stomach, thymus, pituitary gland, ear, and brain. In the brain, C8orf34 is expressed in the dentate gyrus, epithalamus, and medulla. In the mouse brain, an orthologous C8orf34 is expressed highly in the granule layer of the dentate gyrus, the somatosensory areas of the cerebral cortex and in the amygdala.

=== Regulation of expression ===
Several different transcription factors regulate the expression of the C8orf34 gene. Many of these transcription factors are related to regulation of the cell's progression through the cell cycle and longevity, suggesting that C8orf34 performs a function related to these processes.

Transcription factor	Function
OCT1	Involved in the cell cycle regulation of histone H2B gene transcription and in the transcription of other cellular housekeeping genes.
STAT3	Involved in the expression of genes that progress cell cycle from G1 to S phase. Acts as a regulator of inflammatory response by regulating differentiation of naive CD4+ T-cells into T-helper Th17 or regulatory T-cells (Treg).
HSF1	Rapidly induced after temperature stress and binds heat shock promoter elements (HSE). This protein plays a role in the regulation of lifespan.
MZF1	Expressed in hematopoietic progenitor cells that are committed to myeloid lineage differentiation. It contains 13 C2H2 zinc fingers arranged in two domains that are separated by a short glycine- and proline-rich sequence.

== Protein ==
The protein product of the C8orf34 gene is 538 amino acids in length, with a predicted molecular weight of 59kDa and an isoelectric point of 5.9. At the cellular level, several pieces of evidence support the conclusion that C8orf34 plays a role in gene expression regulation and regulation of the cell cycle.

=== Domains ===
C8orf34 has a domain entitled "Dimerization-anchoring domain of cAMP-dependent protein kinase regulatory subunit" that spans residues 94 to 133. Proteins with this domain are subunits of a multimer protein kinase. The negatively-charged region within the middle of the protein may indicate the site of a coordination with a metal ion, a common structure in proteins that interact with DNA, including zinc-finger proteins.

=== Post-translational modifications ===
C8orf34 protein undergoes few modifications following translation. C8orf34 protein is not cleaved after translation. There are eight sites along the protein that are likely candidates for glycosylation and 27 probable sites for phosphorylation. There are four predicted SUMOylation sites in C8orf34. Each of these post-translational modifications is expected to have some effect on the protein. O-glycosylation may influence the sorting of a protein and the protein's conformation. In some cases, glycosylation may play a role in adhesion and immunological processes. Phosphorylation of amino acid residues may serve to activate or deactivate the functional domain of C8orf34. SUMOylation sites are residues that SUMO (small ubiquitin-like modifier) proteins can bind to modify the protein's function. SUMO proteins may modify proteins to perform many functions, including nuclear-cytosolic transport, transcriptional regulation, progressing through the cell cycle, and even apoptosis.

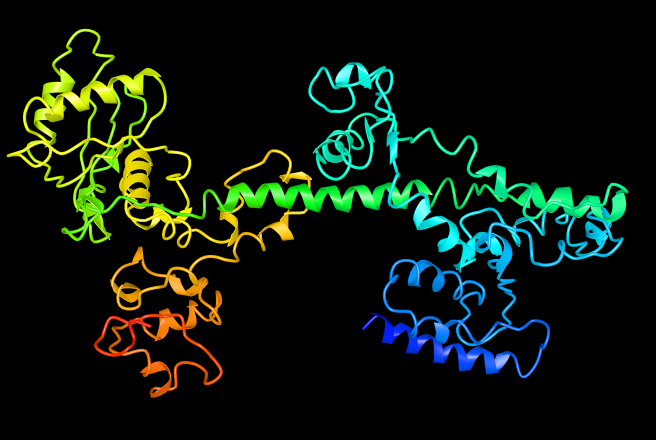
I-TASSER-predicted three-dimensional structure of C8orf34.

=== Structure ===
The secondary structure of C8orf34 is predicted to consist mostly of free random coils with alpha helices being the dominant organized structure. Alpha helices are a common motif in proteins that regulate gene expression and may support this function in C8orf34. The structure prediction and analysis application Phyre2 reported that a portion of C8orf34 has close structural similarity with the yeast methyltransferase H3K4, an enzyme that influences gene expression by catalyzing methylation of DNA.

=== Function ===
Software-based predictions and experimental results yield several possibilities as to the function of C8orf34. The high frequency of alpha helices may indicate a few things about C8orf34's function. Alpha helices are commonly found in DNA-binding motifs of proteins, including helix-turn-helix motifs and zinc finger motifs. As C8orf34 is localized to the nucleus, the presence of alpha helices further supports the possibility that it is involved in gene regulation and expression. The protein kinase dimerization domain within C8orf34 in combination with its presence in the nucleus may indicate that it is a type of histone kinase.

== Homology ==
C8orf34 has been carried across evolutionary events and is observed being expressed as an orthologous protein in several animal clades. There are no observed paralogs for C8orf34 within the human genome as the result of a gene duplication event.

=== Orthologs ===
Orthologs of C8orf34 exist in many species. C8orf34 seems to have appeared first in cnidarians, with sea anemones holding its most distant ortholog. An ortholog most similar in structure and function to human C8orf34 likely arose in aquatic chordates, as there appears to be a higher level of identity beginning with sharks. There is no similar homolog of C8orf34 present in arthropods. This clade may have evolved to no longer need C8orf34 for whatever function it served. Alternatively, arthropod species may have a substitute for C8orf34 that performs a similar function.

Organism	Scientific name	NCBI Accession	Identity %	Seq Length	Est Time of Divergence (MYA)
Human	Homo sapiens	NP_443190.2	100.00%	538	0.00
Gorilla	Gorilla gorilla gorilla	XP_004047177.2	99.44%	538	9.06
Chimpanzee	Pan troglodytes	NP_001186058.1	99.26%	538	6.65
Dog	Canis lupus familiaris	NP_001182595.1	91.59%	451	96.00
Mouse	Mus musculus	NP_001153841.1	90.71%	462	90.00
Chinchilla	Chinchilla lanigera	XP_013373625.1	90.48%	456	90.00
Cat	Felis catus	XP_019678323.2	88.13%	537	96.00
Horse	Equus caballus	XP_023504264.1	86.43%	534	96.00
Thirteen-lined ground squirrel	Ictidomys tridecemlineatus	XP_021580557.1	85.53%	538	90.00
Chicken	Gallus gallus	XP_025003758.1	83.73%	620	312.00
American Alligator	Alligator mississippiensis	XP_019354134.1	82.20%	678	312.00
White-throat sparrow	Zonotrichia albicollis	XP_026647522.1	79.78%	657	312.00
Western clawed frog	Xenopus tropicalis	XP_002935369.2	77.23%	621	352.00
Common box turtle	Terrapene mexicana triunguis	XP_026503128.1	77.21%	414	312.00
Australian ghostshark	Callorhinchus milii	XP_007885522.1	70.80%	709	473.00
Zebrafish	Danio rerio	XP_005162763.1	70.65%	626	435.00
Lamp Shell	Lingula anatina	XP_013381780.1	30.73%	517	797.00
C. teleta	Capitella teleta	ELU06153.1	29.00%	516	797.00
Eastern Oytster	Crassostrea virginica	XP_022341487.1	26.91%	500	797.00
Exaiptasia (sea anemone)	Exaiptasia pallida	XP_020895362.1	26.65%	548	824.00

== Protein interactions ==
Yeast two hybrid experimentation has revealed that C8orf34 interacts with a number of proteins insular to the nucleus. The protein has been shown to interact with ubiquitin C, a precursor protein to polyubiquitin, which functions to lead various effects in the cell cycle depending on the residues it conjugates to. C8orf34 has also demonstrated interactions with MTUS2 (microtubule associated tumor suppressor candidate 2). There is not much information available about this protein candidate, but it is likely to be involved in tumor-suppression functions and cell cycle regulation. C8orf34 also interacts with MCM7 (mini chromosome maintenance complex component 7), part of a protein complex that functions in the Initiation of eukaryotic genome replication during the cell cycle. C8orf34's interactions with these proteins support the conclusion that it is involved in transcription regulation and cell cycle progression.

== Clinical significance ==
Studies have determined that C8orf34 has associations with several diseases. Mutations within C8orf34 are associated with risk for diarrhea and neutropenia in patients receiving chemotherapy. A translocation causing a fusion of the C8orf34 gene with the MET protooncogene has been found in tissue sample of patients with papillary renal carcinoma. A Japanese patent application currently cites a procedure claimed to be able to scan for mutations in C8orf34 as a method for the detection of a congenital disease causing hardness of hearing.
