= UTP6 =

Protein-coding gene in the species Homo sapiens

Identifiers
- Aliases: UTP6, C17orf40, HCA66, small subunit processome component, UTP6 small subunit processome component
- External IDs: MGI: 2445193; HomoloGene: 41265; GeneCards: UTP6; OMA:UTP6 - orthologs

Gene location (Human)
| Chr. | Chromosome 17 (human) |
| Band | 17q11.2 | Start | 31,860,904 bp |
| Band | 17q11.2 | End | 31,901,708 bp |

Gene location (Mouse)
| Chr. | Chromosome 11 (mouse) |
| Band | 11 B5|11 47.29 cM | Start | 79,823,147 bp |
| Band | 11 B5|11 47.29 cM | End | 79,853,216 bp |
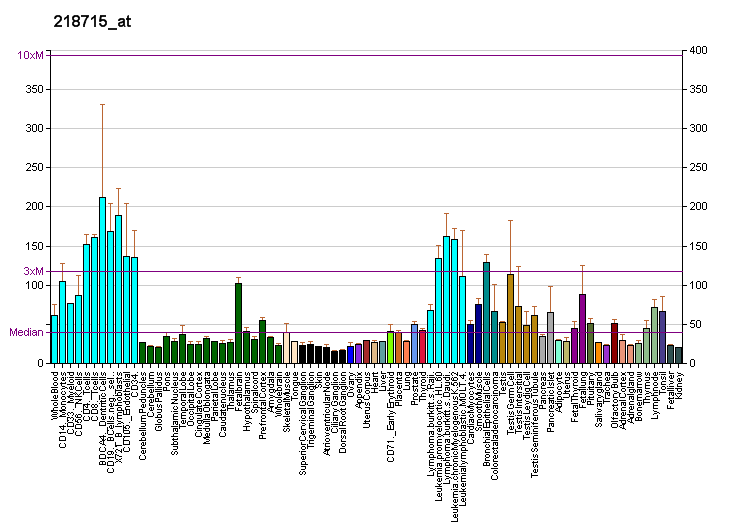
RNA expression pattern
| Bgee | Human / Mouse (ortholog); Top expressed in: Achilles tendon; cerebellar hemisphere; ventricular zone; granulocyte; monocyte; right hemisphere of cerebellum; ganglionic eminence; anterior pituitary; tibial nerve; right testis / Top expressed in: epiblast; otic placode; otic vesicle; ventricular zone; abdominal wall; mandibular prominence; maxillary prominence; Epithelium of choroid plexus; neural layer of retina; primitive streak; More reference expression data |
| BioGPS | More reference expression data |
Gene ontology
| Molecular function | snoRNA binding |
| Cellular component | small-subunit processome; Pwp2p-containing subcomplex of 90S preribosome; nucleolus; nucleus; nucleoplasm |
| Biological process | RNA processing; maturation of SSU-rRNA from tricistronic rRNA transcript (SSU-rRNA, 5.8S rRNA, LSU-rRNA); rRNA processing |
Sources:Amigo / QuickGO
Orthologs
| Species | Human | Mouse |
| Entrez | 55813 | 216987 |
| Ensembl | ENSG00000108651 | ENSMUSG00000035575 |
| UniProt | Q9NYH9 | Q8VCY6 |
| RefSeq (mRNA) | NM_018428 | NM_144826 |
| RefSeq (protein) | NP_060898 | NP_659075 |
| Location (UCSC) | Chr 17: 31.86 – 31.9 Mb | Chr 11: 79.82 – 79.85 Mb |
| PubMed search |
- Wikidata
| View/Edit Human | View/Edit Mouse |

U3 small nucleolar RNA-associated protein 6 homolog is a protein that in humans is encoded by the UTP6 gene.

== See also ==
- Fibrillarin
- Small nucleolar RNA U3
- RCL1
- RRP9
- UTP11L
- UTP14A
- UTP15
