= UTP15 =

Protein-coding gene in the species Homo sapiens

Identifiers
- Aliases: UTP15, NET21, small subunit processome component, UTP15 small subunit processome component
- External IDs: OMIM: 616194; MGI: 2145443; GeneCards: UTP15

Gene location (Human)
Chr.	Chromosome 5 (human)
Band	5q13.2	Start	73,565,443 bp
Band	5q13.2	End	73,583,380 bp

Gene location (Mouse)
Chr.	Chromosome 13 (mouse)
Band	13|13 D1	Start	98,383,353 bp
Band	13|13 D1	End	98,399,549 bp
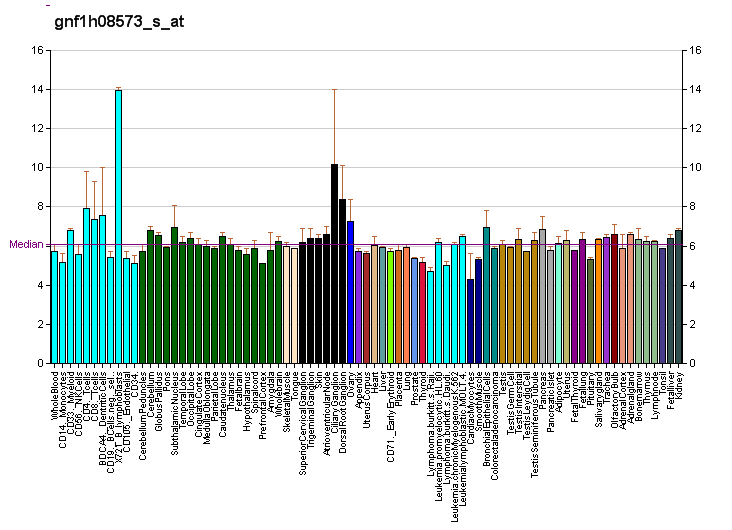

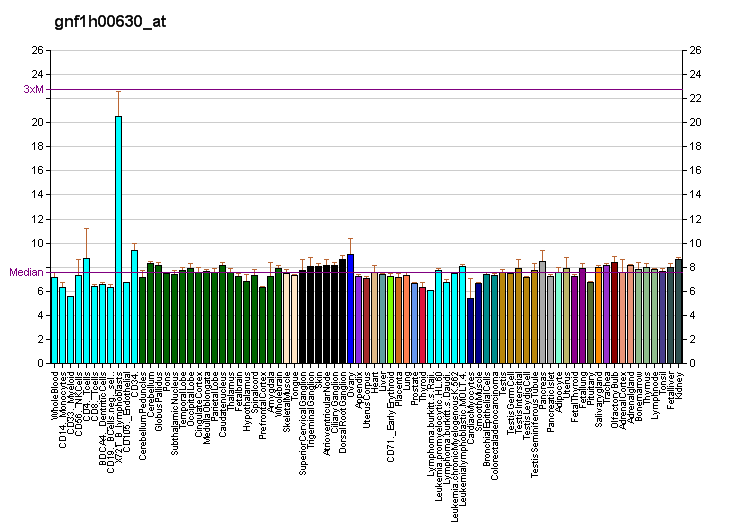

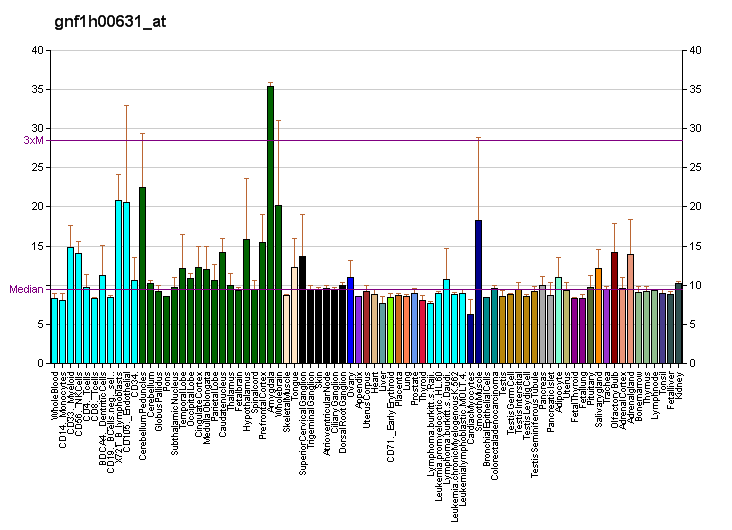
RNA expression pattern
Bgee	Human / Mouse (ortholog); Top expressed in: Achilles tendon; pancreatic epithelial cell; gonad; testicle; skin of abdomen; skin of leg; islet of Langerhans; rectum; monocyte; smooth muscle tissue / Top expressed in: hand; superior cervical ganglion; maxillary prominence; cumulus cell; mandibular prominence; otolith organ; utricle; primitive streak; epiblast; condyle; More reference expression data
BioGPS	More reference expression data
Gene ontology
Molecular function	protein binding; RNA binding
Cellular component	cytoplasm; fibrillar center; nucleolus; nucleoplasm; nucleus; endoplasmic reticulum
Biological process	rRNA processing; positive regulation of transcription by RNA polymerase I; positive regulation of rRNA processing; transcription, DNA-templated; regulation of transcription, DNA-templated; ribosome biogenesis
Sources:Amigo / QuickGO
Orthologs
Databases	NCBI: entry; OMA: entry
Species	Human	Mouse
Entrez	84135	105372
Ensembl	ENSG00000164338	ENSMUSG00000041747
UniProt	Q8TED0	Q8C7V3
RefSeq (mRNA)	NM_001284430; NM_001284431; NM_032175	NM_178918
RefSeq (protein)	NP_001271359; NP_001271360; NP_115551	NP_849249
Location (UCSC)	Chr 5: 73.57 – 73.58 Mb	Chr 13: 98.38 – 98.4 Mb
PubMed search
- Wikidata
View/Edit Human	View/Edit Mouse

U3 small nucleolar RNA-associated protein 15 homolog is a protein that in humans is encoded by the UTP15 gene.

== See also ==
- Fibrillarin
- Small nucleolar RNA U3
- RCL1
- RRP9
- UTP6
- UTP11L
- UTP14A
