= CaSNP =

Database of copy number alterations

Content
- Description: copy number alterations of cancer genome from SNP array data.

Contact
- Research center: Zhejiang University
- Primary citation: PMID 20972221

Access
- Website: http://cistrome.dfci.harvard.edu/CaSNP/

CaSNP is database for storing data about copy number alterations from SNP arrays for different types of cancer.
