= Low copy repeats =

Low copy repeats (LCRs), also known as segmental duplications (SDs), or duplicons, are DNA sequences with high levels of sequence identity, present in multiple locations within a genome.

== Repeats ==
The repeats, or duplications, are typically 10–300 kb in length, and have more than 95% sequence identity. Though rare in most mammals, LCRs comprise a large portion of the human genome owing to a significant expansion during the evolution of primates. In humans, chromosomes Y and 22 have the greatest proportion of SDs: 50.4% and 11.9% respectively. SRGAP2 is an SD.

Misalignment of LCRs during non-allelic homologous recombination (NAHR) is an important mechanism underlying the chromosomal microdeletion disorders as well as their reciprocal duplication partners. Many LCRs are concentrated in "hotspots", such as the 17p11-12 region, 27% of which is composed of LCR sequence. NAHR and non-homologous end joining (NHEJ) within this region are responsible for a wide range of disorders, including Charcot–Marie–Tooth syndrome type 1A, hereditary neuropathy with liability to pressure palsies, Smith–Magenis syndrome, and Potocki–Lupski syndrome.

== Detection ==
The two widely accepted methods for SD detection are:

1. Whole-genome assembly comparison (WGAC), in which regions of homology within the assembly are identified.
2. Whole-genome shotgun sequence detection (WSSD), in which the duplication of regions is inferred by increased read coverage at the site of segmental duplication.

== See also ==
- Pseudogenes
- Molecular evolution
- Comparative genomics
- Inparanoid
- Tandem exon duplication
- 1q21.1 copy number variations
- Segmental duplication on the human Y chromosome
