= UTP11L =

Protein-coding gene in humans

UTP11

Identifiers
- Aliases: UTP11, CGI94, CGI-94, UTP11L, small subunit processome component homolog (S. cerevisiae), small subunit processome component, UTP11 small subunit processome component
- External IDs: OMIM: 609440; MGI: 1914455; GeneCards: UTP11

Gene location (Human)
Chr.	Chromosome 1 (human)
Band	1p34.3	Start	38,009,258 bp
Band	1p34.3	End	38,024,820 bp

Gene location (Mouse)
Chr.	Chromosome 4 (mouse)
Band	4|4 D2.2	Start	124,571,953 bp
Band	4|4 D2.2	End	124,587,393 bp
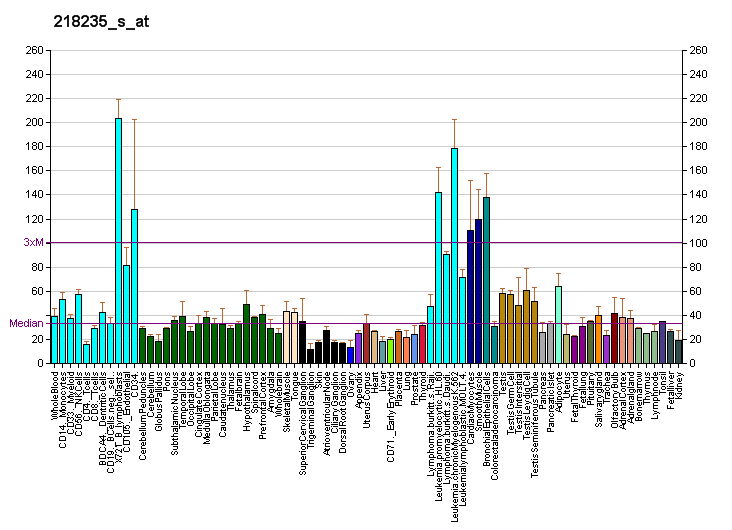
RNA expression pattern
Bgee	Human / Mouse (ortholog); Top expressed in: biceps brachii; Skeletal muscle tissue of biceps brachii; Skeletal muscle tissue of rectus abdominis; gastrocnemius muscle; triceps brachii muscle; deltoid muscle; vastus lateralis muscle; tibialis anterior muscle; muscle of thigh; body of tongue / Top expressed in: endothelial cell of lymphatic vessel; abdominal wall; primitive streak; epithelium of stomach; yolk sac; dermis; fossa; cumulus cell; condyle; renal corpuscle; More reference expression data
BioGPS	More reference expression data
Gene ontology
Molecular function	protein binding; RNA binding
Cellular component	cytoplasm; small-subunit processome; nucleolus; nucleus; nucleoplasm; extracellular space
Biological process	nervous system development; positive regulation of apoptotic process; rRNA processing; ribosomal small subunit biogenesis
Sources:Amigo / QuickGO
Orthologs
Databases	NCBI: entry; OMA: entry
Species	Human	Mouse
Entrez	51118	67205
Ensembl	ENSG00000183520	ENSMUSG00000028907
UniProt	Q9Y3A2	Q9CZJ1
RefSeq (mRNA)	NM_016037	NM_026031
RefSeq (protein)	NP_057121	NP_080307
Location (UCSC)	Chr 1: 38.01 – 38.02 Mb	Chr 4: 124.57 – 124.59 Mb
PubMed search
- Wikidata
View/Edit Human	View/Edit Mouse

Probable U3 small nucleolar RNA-associated protein 11 is a protein that in humans is encoded by the UTP11L gene.

== See also ==
- Fibrillarin
- Small nucleolar RNA U3
- RCL1
- RRP9
- UTP6
- UTP14A
- UTP15
