= RRP9 =

Protein-coding gene in the species Homo sapiens

Identifiers
- Aliases: RRP9, RNU3IP2, U3-55K, ribosomal RNA processing 9, small subunit (SSU) processome component, homolog (yeast), ribosomal RNA processing 9, U3 small nucleolar RNA binding protein
- External IDs: MGI: 2384313; GeneCards: RRP9
Available structures
PDB	Ortholog search: PDBe RCSB
PDB	List of PDB id codes 4J0W, 4JXM

Gene location (Human)
Chr.	Chromosome 3 (human)
Band	3p21.2	Start	51,933,429 bp
Band	3p21.2	End	51,941,904 bp

Gene location (Mouse)
Chr.	Chromosome 9 (mouse)
Band	9 F1|9 57.59 cM	Start	106,353,162 bp
Band	9 F1|9 57.59 cM	End	106,362,623 bp
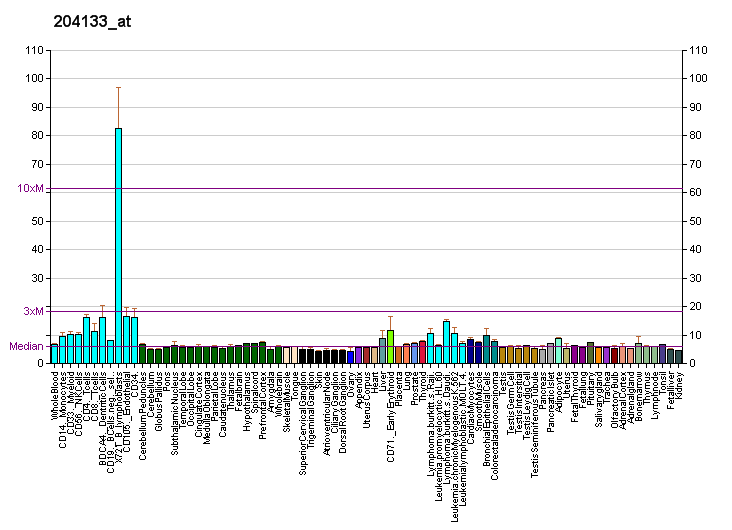
RNA expression pattern
Bgee	Human / Mouse (ortholog); Top expressed in: gastrocnemius muscle; mucosa of transverse colon; left adrenal cortex; left uterine tube; right adrenal gland; right adrenal cortex; muscle of thigh; ectocervix; right ovary; granulocyte / Top expressed in: yolk sac; neural layer of retina; embryo; embryo; morula; epiblast; perirhinal cortex; ventricular zone; entorhinal cortex; muscle of thigh; More reference expression data
BioGPS	More reference expression data
Gene ontology
Molecular function	U3 snoRNA binding; RNA binding; snoRNA binding
Cellular component	small-subunit processome; nucleolus; box C/D RNP complex; nucleoplasm; nucleus
Biological process	rRNA processing
Sources:Amigo / QuickGO
Orthologs
Databases	NCBI: entry; OMA: entry
Species	Human	Mouse
Entrez	9136	27966
Ensembl	ENSG00000114767	ENSMUSG00000041506
UniProt	O43818	Q91WM3
RefSeq (mRNA)	NM_004704	NM_145620
RefSeq (protein)	NP_004695	NP_663595
Location (UCSC)	Chr 3: 51.93 – 51.94 Mb	Chr 9: 106.35 – 106.36 Mb
PubMed search
- Wikidata
View/Edit Human	View/Edit Mouse

U3 small nucleolar RNA-interacting protein 2 is a protein that in humans is encoded by the RRP9 gene.

== See also ==
- Fibrillarin
- Small nucleolar RNA U3
- RCL1
- RRP9
- UTP6
- UTP11L
- UTP14A
- UTP15
