= UTP14A =

Protein-coding gene in the species Homo sapiens

Identifiers
- Aliases: UTP14A, NYCO16, SDCCAG16, dJ537K23.3, UTP14A small subunit processome component, Utp14, small subunit processome component
- External IDs: OMIM: 300508; MGI: 1919804; HomoloGene: 134153; GeneCards: UTP14A; OMA:UTP14A - orthologs

Gene location (Human)
Chr.	X chromosome (human)
Band	Xq26.1	Start	129,906,121 bp
Band	Xq26.1	End	129,929,761 bp

Gene location (Mouse)
Chr.	X chromosome (mouse)
Band	X|X A4	Start	47,345,739 bp
Band	X|X A4	End	47,371,330 bp
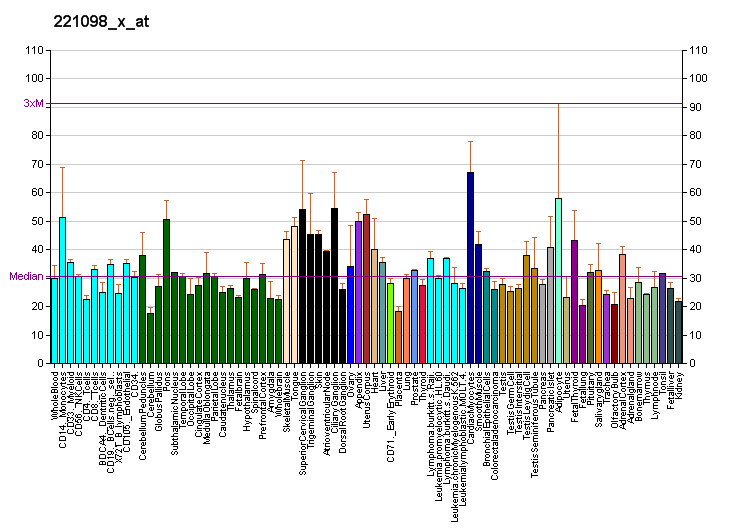

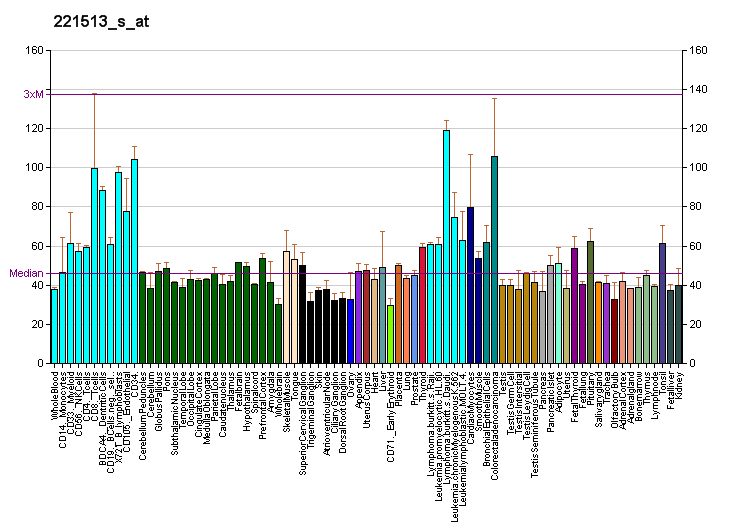

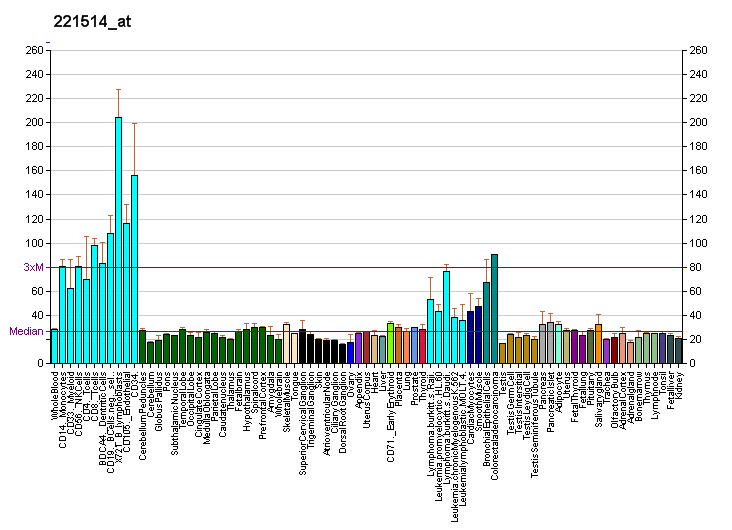
RNA expression pattern
Bgee	Human / Mouse (ortholog); Top expressed in: oocyte; secondary oocyte; gingival epithelium; parotid gland; parietal pleura; middle temporal gyrus; germinal epithelium; amniotic fluid; epithelium of colon; tibia / Top expressed in: genital tubercle; tail of embryo; primitive streak; hair follicle; epiblast; otolith organ; utricle; endothelial cell of lymphatic vessel; morula; morula; More reference expression data
BioGPS	More reference expression data
Gene ontology
Molecular function	protein binding; RNA binding
Cellular component	small-subunit processome; nucleus; nucleoplasm; nucleolus; cytosol
Biological process	ribosome biogenesis; rRNA processing; maturation of SSU-rRNA
Sources:Amigo / QuickGO
Orthologs
Species	Human	Mouse
Entrez	10813	72554
Ensembl	ENSG00000156697	ENSMUSG00000063785
UniProt	Q9BVJ6	Q640M1
RefSeq (mRNA)	NM_001166221; NM_006649	NM_028276
RefSeq (protein)	NP_001159693; NP_006640	NP_082552
Location (UCSC)	Chr X: 129.91 – 129.93 Mb	Chr X: 47.35 – 47.37 Mb
PubMed search
- Wikidata
View/Edit Human	View/Edit Mouse

U3 small nucleolar RNA-associated protein 14 homolog A is a protein that in humans is encoded by the UTP14A gene.

== See also ==
- Fibrillarin
- Small nucleolar RNA U3
- RCL1
- RRP9
- UTP6
- UTP11L
- UTP15
