= Nucleolar protein 56 =

Protein found in humans

NOP56

Identifiers
- Aliases: NOP56, NOL5A, SCA36, NOP56 ribonucleoprotein
- External IDs: OMIM: 614154; MGI: 1914384; GeneCards: NOP56

Gene location (Human)
Chr.	Chromosome 20 (human)
Band	20p13	Start	2,652,593 bp
Band	20p13	End	2,658,393 bp

Gene location (Mouse)
Chr.	Chromosome 2 (mouse)
Band	2|2 F1	Start	130,116,350 bp
Band	2|2 F1	End	130,121,233 bp
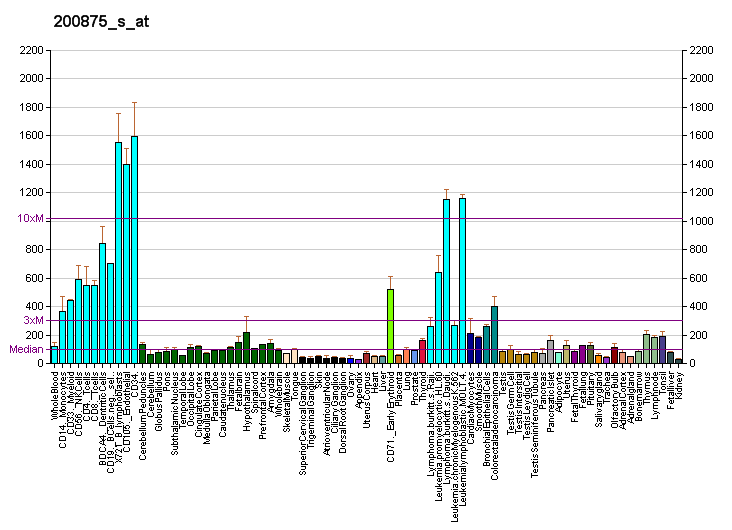

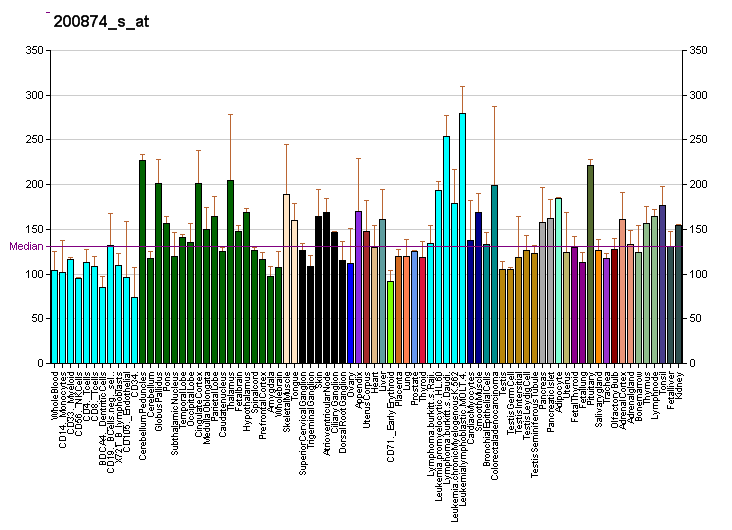
RNA expression pattern
Bgee	Human / Mouse (ortholog); Top expressed in: granulocyte; right hemisphere of cerebellum; body of pancreas; right uterine tube; right ovary; left uterine tube; left ovary; lymph node; anterior pituitary; ventricular zone / Top expressed in: tail of embryo; genital tubercle; epiblast; blastocyst; ventricular zone; embryo; embryo; neural tube; thymus; morula; More reference expression data
BioGPS	More reference expression data
Gene ontology
Molecular function	histone methyltransferase binding; protein binding; snoRNA binding; RNA binding; cadherin binding
Cellular component	cytoplasm; box C/D RNP complex; sno(s)RNA-containing ribonucleoprotein complex; small-subunit processome; pre-snoRNP complex; membrane; nucleus; nucleoplasm; fibrillar center; nucleolus
Biological process	rRNA processing; rRNA modification; ribosome biogenesis
Sources:Amigo / QuickGO
Orthologs
Databases	NCBI: entry; OMA: entry
Species	Human	Mouse
Entrez	10528	67134
Ensembl	ENSG00000101361	ENSMUSG00000027405
UniProt	O00567	Q9D6Z1
RefSeq (mRNA)	NM_006392	NM_024193
RefSeq (protein)	NP_006383	NP_077155
Location (UCSC)	Chr 20: 2.65 – 2.66 Mb	Chr 2: 130.12 – 130.12 Mb
PubMed search
- Wikidata
View/Edit Human	View/Edit Mouse

Nucleolar protein 56 is a protein that in humans is encoded by the NOP56 gene (previously NOL5A).

In yeast, Nop56p is a nucleolar protein that is part of a complex with the nucleolar proteins Nop58p and fibrillarin. Nop56p is required for assembly of the 60S ribosomal subunit and is involved in pre-rRNA processing. The protein encoded by this gene is similar in sequence to Nop56p and is also found in the nucleolus. Multiple transcript variants encoding several different isoforms have been found for this gene, but the full-length nature of most of them have not been determined.
