= RCL1 =

Protein-coding gene in the species Homo sapiens

Identifiers
- Aliases: RCL1, RNAC, RPCL1, RNA terminal phosphate cyclase like 1
- External IDs: OMIM: 611405; MGI: 1913275; GeneCards: RCL1

Gene location (Human)
Chr.	Chromosome 9 (human)
Band	9p24.1	Start	4,792,944 bp
Band	9p24.1	End	4,885,917 bp

Gene location (Mouse)
Chr.	Chromosome 19 (mouse)
Band	19|19 C1	Start	29,078,775 bp
Band	19|19 C1	End	29,121,329 bp
RNA expression pattern
Bgee	Human / Mouse (ortholog); Top expressed in: buccal mucosa cell; right lobe of liver; tendon of biceps brachii; Achilles tendon; tibial arteries; body of pancreas; cartilage tissue; skin of leg; skin of abdomen; left coronary artery / Top expressed in: left lobe of liver; embryo; embryo; epiblast; somite; morula; morula; primitive streak; yolk sac; fetal liver hematopoietic progenitor cell; More reference expression data
BioGPS	n/a
Gene ontology
Molecular function	catalytic activity; RNA-3'-phosphate cyclase activity; endoribonuclease activity
Cellular component	nucleus; nucleoplasm; nucleolus
Biological process	RNA processing; ribosome biogenesis; endonucleolytic cleavage in ITS1 to separate SSU-rRNA from 5.8S rRNA and LSU-rRNA from tricistronic rRNA transcript (SSU-rRNA, 5.8S rRNA, LSU-rRNA); rRNA processing; endonucleolytic cleavage in 5'-ETS of tricistronic rRNA transcript (SSU-rRNA, 5.8S rRNA, LSU-rRNA); endonucleolytic cleavage of tricistronic rRNA transcript (SSU-rRNA, 5.8S rRNA, LSU-rRNA); biological process
Sources:Amigo / QuickGO
Orthologs
Databases	NCBI: entry; OMA: entry
Species	Human	Mouse
Entrez	10171	59028
Ensembl	ENSG00000120158	ENSMUSG00000024785
UniProt	Q9Y2P8	Q9JJT0
RefSeq (mRNA)	NM_001286699; NM_001286700; NM_001286701; NM_005772	NM_021525
RefSeq (protein)	NP_001273628; NP_001273629; NP_001273630; NP_005763	NP_067500
Location (UCSC)	Chr 9: 4.79 – 4.89 Mb	Chr 19: 29.08 – 29.12 Mb
PubMed search
- Wikidata
View/Edit Human	View/Edit Mouse

RNA 3'-terminal phosphate cyclase-like protein is an enzyme that in humans is encoded by the RCL1 gene.

Copy number variants to the RCL1 gene are associated with a range of neuropsychiatric phenotypes, and a missense variant associated with depression.

== See also ==
- Fibrillarin
- Small nucleolar RNA U3
- RRP9
- UTP6
- UTP11L
- UTP14A
- UTP15
