= Small nucleolar RNA U3 =

U3
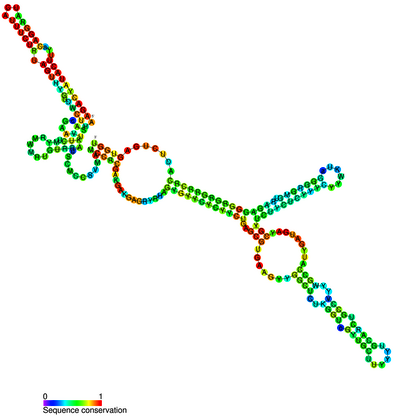
- Metazoan U3 RNA secondary structure and sequence conservation

Identifiers
- Symbol: SNORD3F
- Alt. Symbols: U3, RNU3P2
- Rfam: RF00012
- NCBI Gene: 26844
- HGNC: 52239
- OMIM: 180710

Other data
- RNA type: snoRNA
- Domain: Eukaryota;
- PDB structures: PDBe

In molecular biology, U3 snoRNA is a non-coding RNA found predominantly in the nucleolus. U3 has C/D box motifs that technically make it a member of the box C/D class of snoRNAs; however, unlike other C/D box snoRNAs, it has not been shown to direct 2'-O-methylation of other RNAs. Rather, U3 is thought to guide site-specific cleavage of ribosomal RNA (rRNA) during pre-rRNA processing.

The box C/D element is a subset of the six short sequence elements found in all U3 snoRNAs, namely boxes A, A', B, C, C', and D.

== Secondary Structure ==
The U3 snoRNA secondary structure is characterized by a small 5' domain (with boxes A and A'), and a larger 3' domain (with boxes B, C, C', and D), the two domains being linked by a single-stranded hinge. Boxes B and C form the B/C motif, which appears to be exclusive to U3 snoRNAs, and boxes C' and D form the C'/D motif. The latter is functionally similar to the C/D motifs found in other snoRNAs. The 5' domain and the hinge region act as a pre-rRNA-binding domain. The 3' domain has conserved protein-binding sites. Both the box B/C and box C'/D motifs are sufficient for nuclear retention of U3 snoRNA. The box C'/D motif is also necessary for nucleolar localization, stability and hyper-methylation of U3 snoRNA. Both box B/C and C'/D motifs are involved in specific protein interactions and are necessary for the rRNA processing functions of U3 snoRNA.

Two potential mRNA binding motifs have been identified on U3 that base pair with the target sequences 5'-CUACCUCUCU-3' and 5'-CUCAGGAG-3'. mRNA targets bound by U3 appear to be involved in protein translation.

== Species-specific secondary structure models ==
S. cerevisiae secondary structure determined by chemical mapping of U3A RNA in a purified snoRNP is available. A human structure model has also been proposed. Like yeast and human, protozoan protist Entamoeba histolytica : a primitive eukaryote adopted the same conserved secondary structure of U3 snoRNA. Four consensus structures specific to metazoa, fungi, plants and basal eukaryotes have been proposed.

== See also ==
- Fibrillarin
- RCL1
- RRP9
- UTP6
- UTP11L
- UTP14A
- UTP15
