= PREX2 =

Protein-coding gene in the species Homo sapiens

Identifiers
- Aliases: PREX2, 6230420N16Rik, DEP.2, DEPDC2, P-REX2, PPP1R129, phosphatidylinositol-3,4,5-trisphosphate dependent Rac exchange factor 2
- External IDs: OMIM: 612139; MGI: 1923385; GeneCards: PREX2

Gene location (Human)
Chr.	Chromosome 8 (human)
Band	8q13.2	Start	67,952,046 bp
Band	8q13.2	End	68,237,032 bp

Gene location (Mouse)
Chr.	Chromosome 1 (mouse)
Band	1|1 A2	Start	11,063,689 bp
Band	1|1 A2	End	11,373,905 bp
RNA expression pattern
Bgee	Human / Mouse (ortholog); Top expressed in: Achilles tendon; endothelial cell; visceral pleura; corpus callosum; ventricular zone; parietal pleura; epithelium of colon; adipose tissue; subcutaneous adipose tissue; caudate nucleus / Top expressed in: left lung lobe; lobe of cerebellum; cerebellar vermis; zygote; sciatic nerve; lateral septal nucleus; tail of embryo; otolith organ; right lung; utricle; More reference expression data
BioGPS	n/a
Gene ontology
Molecular function	GTPase activator activity; guanyl-nucleotide exchange factor activity
Cellular component	cytoplasm; plasma membrane; cytosol
Biological process	adult locomotory behavior; phosphatidylinositol 3-kinase signaling; G protein-coupled receptor signaling pathway; regulation of Rho protein signal transduction; intracellular signal transduction; dendrite morphogenesis; positive regulation of GTPase activity; negative regulation of protein kinase activity; negative regulation of TOR signaling
Sources:Amigo / QuickGO
Orthologs
Databases	NCBI: entry; OMA: entry
Species	Human	Mouse
Entrez	80243	109294
Ensembl	ENSG00000046889	ENSMUSG00000048960
UniProt	Q70Z35	Q3LAC4
RefSeq (mRNA)	NM_024870; NM_025170	NM_001033636; NM_029525
RefSeq (protein)	NP_079146; NP_079446	NP_001028808; NP_083801
Location (UCSC)	Chr 8: 67.95 – 68.24 Mb	Chr 1: 11.06 – 11.37 Mb
PubMed search
- Wikidata
View/Edit Human	View/Edit Mouse

Phosphatidylinositol-3,4,5-trisphosphate-dependent Rac exchange factor 2 is a protein that in humans is encoded by the PREX2 gene.

== Clinical relevance ==
Mutations in this gene have been recurrently seen in melanoma.
