= U8 small nucleolar RNA =

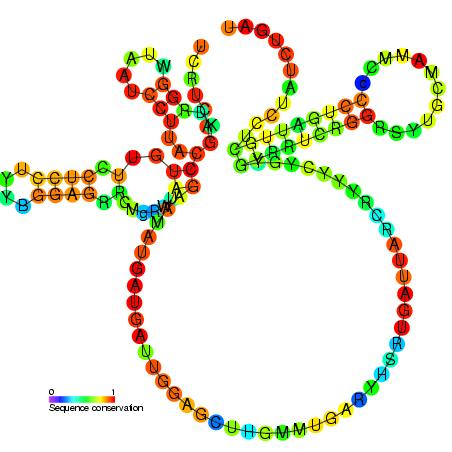
- Predicted secondary structure and sequence conservation of U8

Identifiers
- Symbol: U8
- Alt. Symbols: CeN21; CeR-2
- Rfam: RF00096

Other data
- RNA type: Gene; snRNA; snoRNA; CD-box
- Domain: Eukaryota
- GO: GO:0005730 GO:0006396
- SO: SO:0000593
- PDB structures: PDBe

In molecular biology, U8 small nucleolar RNA (also known as SNORD118) is the RNA component of a small RNA:protein complex (the U8 snoRNP) which is required for biogenesis of mature large subunit ribosomal RNAs, 5.8S and 28S rRNAs.

More specifically, U8 is a non-coding RNA (ncRNA) molecule which functions in the modification of other small nuclear RNAs (snRNAs). This type of modifying RNA is usually located in the nucleolus of the eukaryotic cell which is a major site of snRNA biogenesis. It is known as a small nucleolar RNA (snoRNA) and also often referred to as a guide RNA.

snoRNA U8 belongs to the C/D box class of snoRNAs which contain the conserved sequence motifs known as the C box (UGAUGA) and the D box (CUGA). Most of the members of the box C/D family function in directing site-specific 2'-O-methylation of substrate RNAs.

U8 RNA genes have been identified in human, mouse, rat and the amphibian Xenopus laevis.
