= NOP58 =

Protein-coding gene in the species Homo sapiens

Identifiers
- Aliases: NOP58, NOP5, NOP5/HSPC120, NOP58 ribonucleoprotein
- External IDs: OMIM: 616742; MGI: 1933184; GeneCards: NOP58

Gene location (Human)
Chr.	Chromosome 2 (human)
Band	2q33.1	Start	202,265,736 bp
Band	2q33.1	End	202,303,661 bp

Gene location (Mouse)
Chr.	Chromosome 1 (mouse)
Band	1|1 C2	Start	59,724,130 bp
Band	1|1 C2	End	59,758,203 bp
RNA expression pattern
Bgee	Human / Mouse (ortholog); Top expressed in: pancreatic epithelial cell; pancreatic ductal cell; gingival epithelium; sural nerve; mucosa of sigmoid colon; body of pancreas; Achilles tendon; tonsil; left ovary; anterior pituitary / Top expressed in: tail of embryo; epiblast; genital tubercle; ventricular zone; blastocyst; yolk sac; embryo; embryo; morula; morula; More reference expression data
BioGPS	n/a
Gene ontology
Molecular function	ATPase binding; protein binding; TFIID-class transcription factor complex binding; snoRNA binding; RNA binding
Cellular component	small-subunit processome; Cajal body; pre-snoRNP complex; membrane; nucleoplasm; nucleolus; nucleus; box C/D RNP complex; sno(s)RNA-containing ribonucleoprotein complex; fibrillar center; cytosol
Biological process	ribosome biogenesis; snoRNA localization; cell growth; rRNA processing; rRNA modification
Sources:Amigo / QuickGO
Orthologs
Databases	NCBI: entry; OMA: entry
Species	Human	Mouse
Entrez	51602	55989
Ensembl	ENSG00000055044	ENSMUSG00000026020
UniProt	Q9Y2X3	Q6DFW4
RefSeq (mRNA)	NM_015934	NM_018868
RefSeq (protein)	NP_057018	NP_061356
Location (UCSC)	Chr 2: 202.27 – 202.3 Mb	Chr 1: 59.72 – 59.76 Mb
PubMed search
- Wikidata
View/Edit Human	View/Edit Mouse

Nucleolar protein 58 is a protein that in humans is encoded by the NOP58 gene.
