= Inparanoid =

Inparanoid is an algorithm that finds orthologous genes and paralogous genes that arose—most likely by duplication—after some speciation event. Such protein-coding genes are called in-paralogs, as opposed to out-paralogs (which arose prior to a species split).

Inparanoid (with varying capitalization) may refer to a program that uses the INPARANOID algorithm, or to the derived database of orthologous clusters of genes.

== See also ==
- BLAST
- Proteomics
