= Non-allelic homologous recombination =

Non-allelic homologous recombination (NAHR) is a form of homologous recombination that occurs between two lengths of DNA that have high sequence similarity, but are not alleles.

It usually occurs between sequences of DNA that have been previously duplicated through evolution, and therefore have low copy repeats (LCRs), typically ranging from 10–300 kb in length and exhibiting 95-97% sequence identity. During meiosis, LCRs can misalign and subsequent crossing-over can result in genetic rearrangement. When non-allelic homologous recombination occurs between different LCRs, deletions or further duplications of the DNA can occur. This can give rise to rare genetic disorders, caused by the loss or increased copy number of genes within the deleted or duplicated region. It can also contribute to the copy number variation seen in some gene clusters.

As LCRs are often found in "hotspots" in the human genome, some chromosomal regions are particularly prone to NAHR. Recurrent rearrangements are nucleotide sequence variations found in multiple individuals, sharing a common size and location of break points. Therefore, multiple patients may manifest with similar deletions or duplications, resulting in the description of genetic syndromes. Examples of these include NF1 microdeletion syndrome, 17q21.3 recurrent microdeletion syndrome or 3q29 microdeletion syndrome.

== Mechanism ==
The outcome of NAHR depends on the orientation and chromosomal location of the recombining low copy repeats: direct repeats can produce deletions and reciprocal duplications, inverted repeats can produce inversions, and repeats on different chromosomes can produce translocations. NAHR can occur during both meiosis and mitosis, and its frequency is influenced by genomic architecture, including repeat length, sequence identity, orientation, and the distance between repeats.

== See also ==
- Genetic recombination
- Non-homologous end joining
