= Fibrillarin =

Protein-coding gene in the species Homo sapiens

FBL
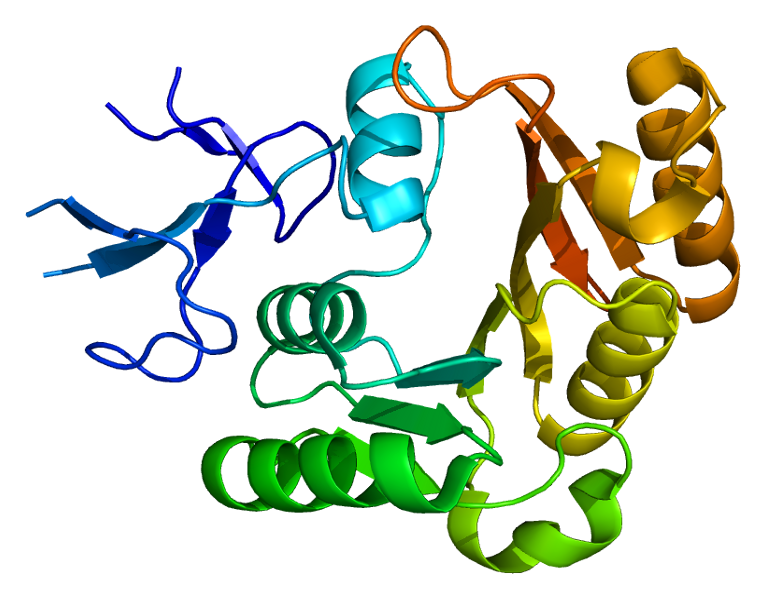

Identifiers
- Aliases: FBL, FIB, FLRN, RNU3IP1, fibrillarin, Nop1
- External IDs: OMIM: 134795; MGI: 95486; GeneCards: FBL
Available structures
PDB	Ortholog search: PDBe RCSB
PDB	List of PDB id codes 2IPX

Gene location (Human)
Chr.	Chromosome 19 (human)
Band	19q13.2	Start	39,834,458 bp
Band	19q13.2	End	39,846,379 bp

Gene location (Mouse)
Chr.	Chromosome 7 (mouse)
Band	7|7 A3	Start	27,869,135 bp
Band	7|7 A3	End	27,878,694 bp
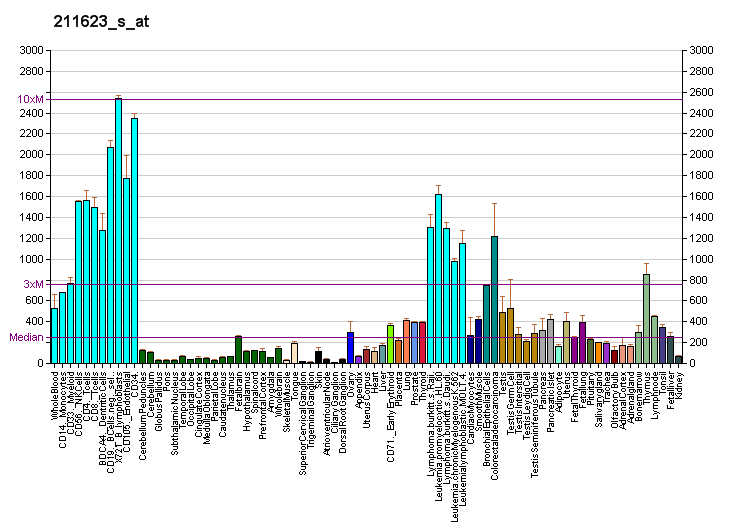
RNA expression pattern
Bgee	Human / Mouse (ortholog); Top expressed in: ganglionic eminence; left ovary; right ovary; skin of abdomen; skin of leg; canal of the cervix; ventricular zone; ectocervix; fallopian tube; monocyte / Top expressed in: epiblast; yolk sac; bone marrow; lens; ventricular zone; lip; spleen; thymus; tail of embryo; embryo; More reference expression data
BioGPS	More reference expression data
Gene ontology
Molecular function	methyltransferase activity; transferase activity; rRNA methyltransferase activity; ATPase binding; histone-glutamine methyltransferase activity; protein binding; TFIID-class transcription factor complex binding; RNA binding
Cellular component	small-subunit processome; Cajal body; membrane; nucleolus; dense fibrillar component; extracellular exosome; nucleus; box C/D RNP complex; granular component; chromosome; nucleoplasm; fibrillar center
Biological process	tRNA processing; snoRNA localization; rRNA methylation; histone glutamine methylation; methylation; box C/D RNA 3'-end processing; sno(s)RNA metabolic process; osteoblast differentiation; rRNA processing
Sources:Amigo / QuickGO
Orthologs
Databases	NCBI: entry; OMA: entry
Species	Human	Mouse
Entrez	2091	14113
Ensembl	ENSG00000105202; ENSG00000280548	ENSMUSG00000046865
UniProt	P22087	P35550
RefSeq (mRNA)	NM_001436	NM_007991
RefSeq (protein)	NP_001427	NP_032017
Location (UCSC)	Chr 19: 39.83 – 39.85 Mb	Chr 7: 27.87 – 27.88 Mb
PubMed search
- Wikidata
View/Edit Human	View/Edit Mouse

Fibrillarin
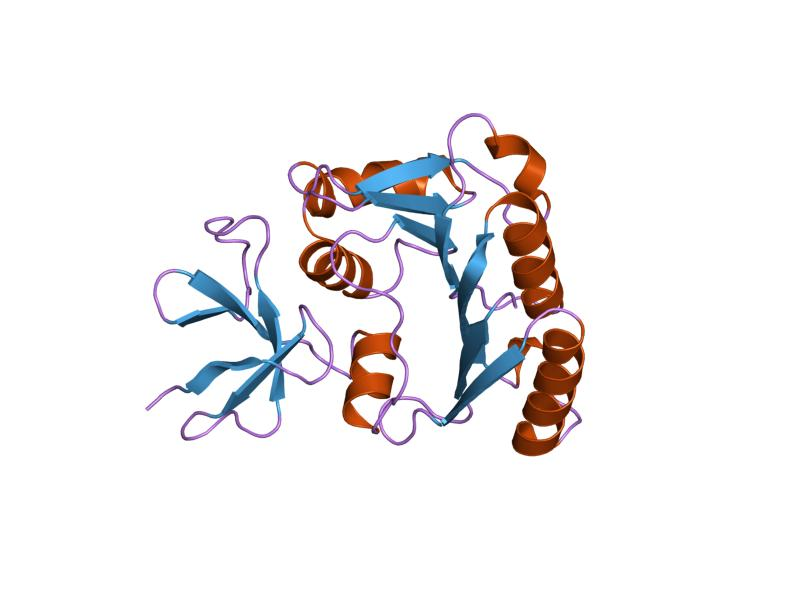
- pyrococcus horikoshii fibrillarin pre-rrna processing protein

Identifiers
- Symbol: Fibrillarin
- Pfam: PF01269
- Pfam clan: CL0063
- InterPro: IPR000692
- PROSITE: PDOC00489
- SCOP2: 1fbn / SCOPe / SUPFAM
Available protein structures:
- PDB: IPR000692 PF01269 (ECOD; PDBsum)
- AlphaFold: IPR000692; PF01269

rRNA 2'-O-methyltransferase fibrillarin is an enzyme that in humans is encoded by the FBL gene.

== Function ==
This gene product is a component of a nucleolar small nuclear ribonucleoprotein (snRNP) particle thought to participate in the first step in processing pre-ribosomal (r)RNA. It is associated with the U3, U8, and U13 small nucleolar RNAs and is located in the dense fibrillar component (DFC) of the nucleolus. The encoded protein contains an N-terminal repetitive domain that is rich in glycine and arginine residues, like fibrillarins in other species. Its central region resembles an RNA-binding domain and contains an RNP consensus sequence. Antisera from approximately 8% of humans with the autoimmune disease scleroderma recognize fibrillarin.

Fibrillarin is a component of several ribonucleoproteins including a nucleolar small nuclear ribonucleoprotein (SnRNP) and one of the two classes of small nucleolar ribonucleoproteins (snoRNPs). SnRNAs function in RNA splicing while snoRNPs function in ribosomal RNA processing.

Fibrillarin is associated with U3, U8 and U13 small nuclear RNAs in mammals and is similar to the yeast NOP1 protein. Fibrillarin has a well conserved sequence of around 320 amino acids, and contains 3 domains, an N-terminal Gly/Arg-rich region; a central domain resembling other RNA-binding proteins and containing an RNP-2-like consensus sequence; and a C-terminal alpha-helical domain. An evolutionarily related pre-rRNA processing protein, which lacks the Gly/Arg-rich domain, has been found in various archaea.

A study by Schultz et al. indicated that the K-turn binding 15.5-kDa protein (called Snu13 in yeast) interacts with spliceosome proteins hPRP31, hPRP3, hPRP4, CYPH and the small nucleolar ribonucleoproteins NOP56, NOP58, and fibrillarin. The 15.5-kDa protein has sequence similarity to other RNA-binding proteins such as ribosomal proteins S12, L7a, and L30 and the snoRNP protein NHP2. The U4/U6 snRNP contains 15.5-kDa protein. The 15.5-kDa protein also exists in a ribonucleoprotein complex that binds the U3 box B/C motif. The 15.5-kDa protein also exists as one of the four core proteins of the C/D small nucleolar ribonucleoprotein that mediates methylation of pre-ribosomal RNAs.

Structural evidence supporting the idea that fibrillarin is the snoRNA methyltransferase has been reviewed.

== Interactions ==
Fibrillarin has been shown to interact with DDX5 and SMN1.
