= List of human transcription factors =

This list of manually-curated human transcription factors is taken from Lambert, Jolma, Campitelli, et al.

More detailed information can be found in the manuscript and accompanying web site.

== List of human transcription factors (1639) ==
Gene	ID	DBD	Motif status (Feb 2018)	IUPAC consensus (from selected PWM)
AC008770.3	ENSG00000267179	C2H2 ZF	Likely sequence specific TF according to literature or domain structure – No motif	
AC023509.3	ENSG00000267281	bZIP	Known motif – from protein with 100% identical DBD – in vitro	RTGACGTCAY
AC092835.1	ENSG00000233757	C2H2 ZF	Likely sequence specific TF according to literature or domain structure – No motif	
AC138696.1	ENSG00000264668	C2H2 ZF	Known motif – from protein with 100% identical DBD – in vitro	RYGGAGAGTTAGC
ADNP	ENSG00000101126	Homeodomain	Likely sequence specific TF according to literature or domain structure – No motif	
ADNP2	ENSG00000101544	Homeodomain	Likely sequence specific TF according to literature or domain structure – No motif	
AEBP1	ENSG00000106624	Unknown	Likely sequence specific TF according to literature or domain structure – No motif	
AEBP2	ENSG00000139154	C2H2 ZF	Likely sequence specific TF according to literature or domain structure – No motif	
AHCTF1	ENSG00000153207	AT hook	Likely sequence specific TF according to literature or domain structure – No motif	
AHDC1	ENSG00000126705	AT hook	Likely sequence specific TF according to literature or domain structure – No motif	
AHR	ENSG00000106546	bHLH	Known motif – In vivo/Misc source	BKNGCGTGHV
AHRR	ENSG00000063438	bHLH	Inferred motif from similar protein – In vivo/Misc source	BKNGCGTGHV
AIRE	ENSG00000160224	SAND	Known motif – In vivo/Misc source	HNNGGWWNWDWWGGDBDH
AKAP8	ENSG00000105127	C2H2 ZF	Likely sequence specific TF according to literature or domain structure – No motif	
AKAP8L	ENSG00000011243	C2H2 ZF	Likely sequence specific TF according to literature or domain structure – No motif	
AKNA	ENSG00000106948	AT hook	Likely sequence specific TF according to literature or domain structure – No motif	
ALX1	ENSG00000180318	Homeodomain	Known motif – High-throughput in vitro	TAATYTAATTA
ALX3	ENSG00000156150	Homeodomain	Known motif – High-throughput in vitro	TAATTR
ALX4	ENSG00000052850	Homeodomain	Known motif – High-throughput in vitro	TAATYNRRTTA
ANHX	ENSG00000227059	Homeodomain	Known motif – High-throughput in vitro	KTKACAWG
ANKZF1	ENSG00000163516	C2H2 ZF	Likely sequence specific TF according to literature or domain structure – No motif	
AR	ENSG00000169083	Nuclear receptor	Known motif – High-throughput in vitro	RGGWACRHBDYGTWCYH
ARGFX	ENSG00000186103	Homeodomain	Known motif – High-throughput in vitro	DYTAATTAR
ARHGAP35	ENSG00000160007	Unknown	Likely sequence specific TF according to literature or domain structure – No motif	
ARID2	ENSG00000189079	ARID/BRIGHT; RFX	Likely sequence specific TF according to literature or domain structure – No motif	
ARID3A	ENSG00000116017	ARID/BRIGHT	Known motif – from protein with 100% identical DBD – in vitro	DATHAAD
ARID3B	ENSG00000179361	ARID/BRIGHT	Inferred motif from similar protein – High-throughput in vitro	WWTTAATH
ARID3C	ENSG00000205143	ARID/BRIGHT	Inferred motif from similar protein – High-throughput in vitro	DATHAAD
ARID5A	ENSG00000196843	ARID/BRIGHT	Known motif – from protein with 100% identical DBD – in vitro	HAATATTD
ARID5B	ENSG00000150347	ARID/BRIGHT	Known motif – from protein with 100% identical DBD – in vitro	DATWH
ARNT	ENSG00000143437	bHLH	Known motif – from protein with 100% identical DBD – in vitro	KCACGTGM
ARNT2	ENSG00000172379	bHLH	Known motif – High-throughput in vitro	RDCACGTGM
ARNTL	ENSG00000133794	bHLH	Known motif – High-throughput in vitro	GTCACGTGAC
ARNTL2	ENSG00000029153	bHLH	Inferred motif from similar protein – High-throughput in vitro	CACGTGAY
ARX	ENSG00000004848	Homeodomain	Known motif – High-throughput in vitro	TAATYNRATTA
ASCL1	ENSG00000139352	bHLH	Known motif – High-throughput in vitro	RCASSTGY
ASCL2	ENSG00000183734	bHLH	Known motif – High-throughput in vitro	RCAGCTGY
ASCL3	ENSG00000176009	bHLH	Inferred motif from similar protein – High-throughput in vitro	RCASSTGY
ASCL4	ENSG00000187855	bHLH	Inferred motif from similar protein – High-throughput in vitro	RCASSTGY
ASCL5	ENSG00000232237	bHLH	Inferred motif from similar protein – High-throughput in vitro	RCASSTGY
ASH1L	ENSG00000116539	AT hook	Likely sequence specific TF according to literature or domain structure – No motif	
ATF1	ENSG00000123268	bZIP	Known motif – In vivo/Misc source	VTGACGTSAV
ATF2	ENSG00000115966	bZIP	Known motif – High-throughput in vitro	VTKACGTMAB
ATF3	ENSG00000162772	bZIP	Known motif – High-throughput in vitro	RTGACGTCAY
ATF4	ENSG00000128272	bZIP	Known motif – High-throughput in vitro	RKATGACGTCATMY
ATF5	ENSG00000169136	bZIP	Known motif – In vivo/Misc source	WAAGGRAGARR
ATF6	ENSG00000118217	bZIP	Known motif – High-throughput in vitro	YKRTGACGTGGCA
ATF6B	ENSG00000213676	bZIP	Known motif – High-throughput in vitro	RTGACGTGGCR
ATF7	ENSG00000170653	bZIP	Known motif – High-throughput in vitro	DRTGACGTCAT
ATMIN	ENSG00000166454	C2H2 ZF	Likely sequence specific TF according to literature or domain structure – No motif	
ATOH1	ENSG00000172238	bHLH	Known motif – High-throughput in vitro	RACAGCTGYY
ATOH7	ENSG00000179774	bHLH	Known motif – High-throughput in vitro	RVCATATGBT
ATOH8	ENSG00000168874	bHLH	Inferred motif from similar protein – High-throughput in vitro	AAWTANNNBRMCATATGKY
BACH1	ENSG00000156273	bZIP	Known motif – In vivo/Misc source	RTGACTCAGCANWWH
BACH2	ENSG00000112182	bZIP	Known motif – High-throughput in vitro	WDNSATGASTCATGNWW
BARHL1	ENSG00000125492	Homeodomain	Known motif – High-throughput in vitro	TAAWYG
BARHL2	ENSG00000143032	Homeodomain	Known motif – High-throughput in vitro	TAAWBG
BARX1	ENSG00000131668	Homeodomain	Known motif – High-throughput in vitro	TAATBGNWWWTTAATBR
BARX2	ENSG00000043039	Homeodomain	Known motif – High-throughput in vitro	TAAYKRTTWW
BATF	ENSG00000156127	bZIP	Known motif – High-throughput in vitro	VVYGMCAC
BATF2	ENSG00000168062	bZIP	Likely sequence specific TF according to literature or domain structure – No motif	
BATF3	ENSG00000123685	bZIP	Known motif – High-throughput in vitro	VTGACGTCAYV
BAZ2A	ENSG00000076108	MBD; AT hook	Likely sequence specific TF according to literature or domain structure – No motif	
BAZ2B	ENSG00000123636	MBD	Likely sequence specific TF according to literature or domain structure – No motif	
BBX	ENSG00000114439	HMG/Sox	Known motif – High-throughput in vitro	TGAWCDNYGWTCA
BCL11A	ENSG00000119866	C2H2 ZF	Known motif – In vivo/Misc source	DDRRGGAASTGARAV
BCL11B	ENSG00000127152	C2H2 ZF	Known motif – High-throughput in vitro	GTGAACGBNDNNVCTACAC
BCL6	ENSG00000113916	C2H2 ZF	Known motif – High-throughput in vitro	YGCTTTCKAGGAAH
BCL6B	ENSG00000161940	C2H2 ZF	Known motif – High-throughput in vitro	GCTTTCKAGGAAH
BHLHA15	ENSG00000180535	bHLH	Known motif – High-throughput in vitro	VCATATGB
BHLHA9	ENSG00000205899	bHLH	Likely sequence specific TF according to literature or domain structure – No motif	
BHLHE22	ENSG00000180828	bHLH	Known motif – High-throughput in vitro	AVCATATGBT
BHLHE23	ENSG00000125533	bHLH	Known motif – High-throughput in vitro	AVCATATGBY
BHLHE40	ENSG00000134107	bHLH	Known motif – High-throughput in vitro	DKCACGTGM
BHLHE41	ENSG00000123095	bHLH	Known motif – High-throughput in vitro	RKCACGTGAY
BNC1	ENSG00000169594	C2H2 ZF	Inferred motif from similar protein – In vivo/Misc source	CCRCCWTCA
BNC2	ENSG00000173068	C2H2 ZF	Inferred motif from similar protein – In vivo/Misc source	CCRCCWTCA
BORCS8-MEF2B	ENSG00000064489	MADS box	Known motif – from protein with 100% identical DBD – in vitro	CCDWWWHNRG
BPTF	ENSG00000171634	Unknown	Known motif – In vivo/Misc source	KKKNTTGTKKNV
BRF2	ENSG00000104221	Unknown	Likely sequence specific TF according to literature or domain structure – No motif	
BSX	ENSG00000188909	Homeodomain	Known motif – High-throughput in vitro	TAATBR
C11orf95	ENSG00000188070	BED ZF	Likely sequence specific TF according to literature or domain structure – No motif	
CAMTA1	ENSG00000171735	CG-1	Likely sequence specific TF according to literature or domain structure – No motif	
CAMTA2	ENSG00000108509	CG-1	Likely sequence specific TF according to literature or domain structure – No motif	
CARF	ENSG00000138380	Unknown	Known motif – In vivo/Misc source	GCCTCGTTYTSR
CASZ1	ENSG00000130940	C2H2 ZF	Likely sequence specific TF according to literature or domain structure – No motif	
CBX2	ENSG00000173894	AT hook	Likely sequence specific TF according to literature or domain structure – No motif	
CC2D1A	ENSG00000132024	Unknown	Likely sequence specific TF according to literature or domain structure – No motif	
CCDC169-SOHLH2	ENSG00000250709	bHLH	Known motif – from protein with 100% identical DBD – in vitro	BCACGTGC
CCDC17	ENSG00000159588	C2H2 ZF	Likely sequence specific TF according to literature or domain structure – No motif	
CDC5L	ENSG00000096401	Myb/SANT	Known motif – In vivo/Misc source	VBGWKDTAAYRWAWB
CDX1	ENSG00000113722	Homeodomain	Known motif – High-throughput in vitro	TTTATKRB
CDX2	ENSG00000165556	Homeodomain	Known motif – High-throughput in vitro	DWWATKRB
CDX4	ENSG00000131264	Homeodomain	Known motif – High-throughput in vitro	VKTTTATKRCH
CEBPA	ENSG00000245848	bZIP	Known motif – from protein with 100% identical DBD – in vitro	TTGCGHAA
CEBPB	ENSG00000172216	bZIP	Known motif – High-throughput in vitro	VTTRCGCAAY
CEBPD	ENSG00000221869	bZIP	Known motif – High-throughput in vitro	VTTRCGCAAY
CEBPE	ENSG00000092067	bZIP	Known motif – High-throughput in vitro	VTTRCGCAAY
CEBPG	ENSG00000153879	bZIP	Known motif – High-throughput in vitro	RTTRCGCAAY
CEBPZ	ENSG00000115816	Unknown	Known motif – In vivo/Misc source	DSTSATTGGCT
CENPA	ENSG00000115163	Unknown	Likely sequence specific TF according to literature or domain structure – No motif	
CENPB	ENSG00000125817	CENPB	Known motif – High-throughput in vitro	TWCGYNNNAHRCGGG
CENPBD1	ENSG00000177946	CENPB	Known motif – High-throughput in vitro	WNYGWAD
CENPS	ENSG00000175279	Unknown	Likely sequence specific TF according to literature or domain structure – No motif	
CENPT	ENSG00000102901	Unknown	Likely sequence specific TF according to literature or domain structure – No motif	
CENPX	ENSG00000169689	Unknown	Likely sequence specific TF according to literature or domain structure – No motif	
CGGBP1	ENSG00000163320	Unknown	Likely sequence specific TF according to literature or domain structure – No motif	
CHAMP1	ENSG00000198824	C2H2 ZF	Likely sequence specific TF according to literature or domain structure – No motif	
CHCHD3	ENSG00000106554	Unknown	Likely sequence specific TF according to literature or domain structure – No motif	
CIC	ENSG00000079432	HMG/Sox	Known motif – from protein with 100% identical DBD – in vitro	VTCAGCA
CLOCK	ENSG00000134852	bHLH	Known motif – High-throughput in vitro	DACACGTGYH
CPEB1	ENSG00000214575	Unknown	Known motif – High-throughput in vitro	HTTTTATH
CPXCR1	ENSG00000147183	C2H2 ZF	Likely sequence specific TF according to literature or domain structure – No motif	
CREB1	ENSG00000118260	bZIP	Known motif – High-throughput in vitro	VTKACGTMA
CREB3	ENSG00000107175	bZIP	Known motif – High-throughput in vitro	RTGACGTGKH
CREB3L1	ENSG00000157613	bZIP	Known motif – High-throughput in vitro	TGCCACGTGGCR
CREB3L2	ENSG00000182158	bZIP	Known motif – from protein with 100% identical DBD – in vitro	HCACGTGKM
CREB3L3	ENSG00000060566	bZIP	Likely sequence specific TF according to literature or domain structure – No motif	
CREB3L4	ENSG00000143578	bZIP	Known motif – High-throughput in vitro	VTGACGTGGM
CREB5	ENSG00000146592	bZIP	Known motif – High-throughput in vitro	VTKACRTMAB
CREBL2	ENSG00000111269	bZIP	Inferred motif from similar protein – High-throughput in vitro	ATKACGTMAY
CREBZF	ENSG00000137504	bZIP	Inferred motif from similar protein – High-throughput in vitro	WWACGTWD
CREM	ENSG00000095794	bZIP	Known motif – High-throughput in vitro	VVTBACGTVAB
CRX	ENSG00000105392	Homeodomain	Known motif – High-throughput in vitro	TAATCC
CSRNP1	ENSG00000144655	Unknown	Likely sequence specific TF according to literature or domain structure – No motif	
CSRNP2	ENSG00000110925	Unknown	Likely sequence specific TF according to literature or domain structure – No motif	
CSRNP3	ENSG00000178662	Unknown	Likely sequence specific TF according to literature or domain structure – No motif	
CTCF	ENSG00000102974	C2H2 ZF	Known motif – High-throughput in vitro	CCDSBAGGKGGCGCB
CTCFL	ENSG00000124092	C2H2 ZF	Known motif – In vivo/Misc source	CCNSYAGGGGGCGCY
CUX1	ENSG00000257923	CUT; Homeodomain	Known motif – High-throughput in vitro	ATYGATHA
CUX2	ENSG00000111249	CUT; Homeodomain	Known motif – High-throughput in vitro	DDATYGATYA
CXXC1	ENSG00000154832	CxxC	Known motif – High-throughput in vitro	BCG
CXXC4	ENSG00000168772	CxxC	Likely sequence specific TF according to literature or domain structure – No motif	
CXXC5	ENSG00000171604	CxxC	Known motif – High-throughput in vitro	DCK
DACH1	ENSG00000276644	Unknown	Likely sequence specific TF according to literature or domain structure – No motif	
DACH2	ENSG00000126733	Unknown	Likely sequence specific TF according to literature or domain structure – No motif	
DBP	ENSG00000105516	bZIP	Known motif – High-throughput in vitro	RTTAYRTAAB
DBX1	ENSG00000109851	Homeodomain	Inferred motif from similar protein – High-throughput in vitro	WTTAATTA
DBX2	ENSG00000185610	Homeodomain	Inferred motif from similar protein – High-throughput in vitro	AH
DDIT3	ENSG00000175197	bZIP	Known motif – In vivo/Misc source	RVVKATTGCANNB
DEAF1	ENSG00000177030	SAND	Inferred motif from similar protein – In vivo/Misc source	VCRBNYYCGKGDRYTTCCGDVDNNB
DLX1	ENSG00000144355	Homeodomain	Known motif – High-throughput in vitro	TAATTR
DLX2	ENSG00000115844	Homeodomain	Known motif – High-throughput in vitro	TAATTR
DLX3	ENSG00000064195	Homeodomain	Known motif – High-throughput in vitro	TAATTR
DLX4	ENSG00000108813	Homeodomain	Known motif – High-throughput in vitro	TAATTR
DLX5	ENSG00000105880	Homeodomain	Known motif – High-throughput in vitro	TAATTR
DLX6	ENSG00000006377	Homeodomain	Known motif – High-throughput in vitro	TAATTR
DMBX1	ENSG00000197587	Homeodomain	Known motif – High-throughput in vitro	HTAATCCB
DMRT1	ENSG00000137090	DM	Known motif – High-throughput in vitro	GHWACWH
DMRT2	ENSG00000173253	DM	Known motif – High-throughput in vitro	DATAMATT
DMRT3	ENSG00000064218	DM	Known motif – High-throughput in vitro	DWWTTGWTACAWT
DMRTA1	ENSG00000176399	DM	Known motif – High-throughput in vitro	DDWTGHTACAW
DMRTA2	ENSG00000142700	DM	Known motif – High-throughput in vitro	DHBGHWACADB
DMRTB1	ENSG00000143006	DM	Likely sequence specific TF according to literature or domain structure – No motif	
DMRTC2	ENSG00000142025	DM	Known motif – High-throughput in vitro	WWTTGHTACAW
DMTF1	ENSG00000135164	Myb/SANT	Likely sequence specific TF according to literature or domain structure – No motif	
DNMT1	ENSG00000130816	CxxC	Known motif – High-throughput in vitro	CGG
DNTTIP1	ENSG00000101457	AT hook	Likely sequence specific TF according to literature or domain structure – No motif	
DOT1L	ENSG00000104885	AT hook	Likely sequence specific TF according to literature or domain structure – No motif	
DPF1	ENSG00000011332	C2H2 ZF	Known motif – High-throughput in vitro	KMTATAGGBG
DPF3	ENSG00000205683	C2H2 ZF	Inferred motif from similar protein – High-throughput in vitro	KMTATAGGBG
DPRX	ENSG00000204595	Homeodomain	Known motif – High-throughput in vitro	RGMTAATCY
DR1	ENSG00000117505	Unknown	Likely sequence specific TF according to literature or domain structure – No motif	
DRAP1	ENSG00000175550	Unknown	Likely sequence specific TF according to literature or domain structure – No motif	
DRGX	ENSG00000165606	Homeodomain	Known motif – High-throughput in vitro	TAATYNAATTA
DUX1	DUX1_HUMAN	Homeodomain	Known motif – In vivo/Misc source	ATAATCTGATTAT
DUX3	DUX3_HUMAN	Homeodomain	Known motif – In vivo/Misc source	TTAATTAAATTAA
DUX4	ENSG00000260596	Homeodomain	Known motif – In vivo/Misc source	TGATTRRRTTA
DUXA	ENSG00000258873	Homeodomain	Known motif – High-throughput in vitro	TGATTRVRTYD
DZIP1	ENSG00000134874	C2H2 ZF	Likely sequence specific TF according to literature or domain structure – No motif	
E2F1	ENSG00000101412	E2F	Known motif – High-throughput in vitro	WTTGGCGCCHWW
E2F2	ENSG00000007968	E2F	Known motif – High-throughput in vitro	WDWWGGCGCCHWWH
E2F3	ENSG00000112242	E2F	Known motif – High-throughput in vitro	TTTTGGCGCCMTTTTY
E2F4	ENSG00000205250	E2F	Known motif – High-throughput in vitro	TTTGGCGCCAAA
E2F5	ENSG00000133740	E2F	Known motif – In vivo/Misc source	TTTSGCGC
E2F6	ENSG00000169016	E2F	Known motif – In vivo/Misc source	DGGMGGGARV
E2F7	ENSG00000165891	E2F	Known motif – High-throughput in vitro	WTTTGGCGGGAAAH
E2F8	ENSG00000129173	E2F	Known motif – High-throughput in vitro	TTTGGCGGGAAA
E4F1	ENSG00000167967	C2H2 ZF	Known motif – In vivo/Misc source	RTGACGTARS
EBF1	ENSG00000164330	EBF1	Known motif – High-throughput in vitro	ANTCCCHWGGGAHH
EBF2	ENSG00000221818	EBF1	Known motif – In vivo/Misc source	VTGMAACCCCCWWTHVK
EBF3	ENSG00000108001	EBF1	Known motif – In vivo/Misc source	BTCCCYWGRGD
EBF4	ENSG00000088881	EBF1	Known motif – In vivo/Misc source	CGSATAACCMTTGTTATCAB
EEA1	ENSG00000102189	C2H2 ZF	Likely sequence specific TF according to literature or domain structure – No motif	
EGR1	ENSG00000120738	C2H2 ZF	Known motif – High-throughput in vitro	MCGCCCMCGCA
EGR2	ENSG00000122877	C2H2 ZF	Known motif – High-throughput in vitro	MCGCCCACGCD
EGR3	ENSG00000179388	C2H2 ZF	Known motif – High-throughput in vitro	HMCGCCCMCGCAH
EGR4	ENSG00000135625	C2H2 ZF	Known motif – High-throughput in vitro	HMCGCCCACGCAH
EHF	ENSG00000135373	Ets	Known motif – High-throughput in vitro	ACCCGGAAGTD
ELF1	ENSG00000120690	Ets	Known motif – High-throughput in vitro	WHSCGGAAGY
ELF2	ENSG00000109381	Ets	Known motif – High-throughput in vitro	AMCCGGAAGTV
ELF3	ENSG00000163435	Ets; AT hook	Known motif – High-throughput in vitro	WACCCGGAAGTR
ELF4	ENSG00000102034	Ets	Known motif – High-throughput in vitro	ABSCGGAAGTR
ELF5	ENSG00000135374	Ets	Known motif – High-throughput in vitro	WNVMGGAARY
ELK1	ENSG00000126767	Ets	Known motif – High-throughput in vitro	RCCGGAAGT
ELK3	ENSG00000111145	Ets	Known motif – High-throughput in vitro	RCCGGAAGT
ELK4	ENSG00000158711	Ets	Known motif – High-throughput in vitro	ACCGGAARY
EMX1	ENSG00000135638	Homeodomain	Known motif – High-throughput in vitro	BTAATTR
EMX2	ENSG00000170370	Homeodomain	Known motif – High-throughput in vitro	BTAATTA
EN1	ENSG00000163064	Homeodomain	Known motif – High-throughput in vitro	TAATTRVB
EN2	ENSG00000164778	Homeodomain	Known motif – High-throughput in vitro	TAATTR
EOMES	ENSG00000163508	T-box	Known motif – High-throughput in vitro	WTCACACCTH
EPAS1	ENSG00000116016	bHLH	Known motif – In vivo/Misc source	VDACGTGHH
ERF	ENSG00000105722	Ets	Known motif – High-throughput in vitro	ACCGGAARTV
ERG	ENSG00000157554	Ets	Known motif – High-throughput in vitro	ACCGGAARY
ESR1	ENSG00000091831	Nuclear receptor	Known motif – High-throughput in vitro	AGGTCAYSRTGACCT
ESR2	ENSG00000140009	Nuclear receptor	Known motif – from protein with 100% identical DBD – in vitro	RGGTCAH
ESRRA	ENSG00000173153	Nuclear receptor	Known motif – High-throughput in vitro	SAAGGTCA
ESRRB	ENSG00000119715	Nuclear receptor	Known motif – High-throughput in vitro	TCAAGGTCAWH
ESRRG	ENSG00000196482	Nuclear receptor	Known motif – High-throughput in vitro	SAAGGTCR
ESX1	ENSG00000123576	Homeodomain	Known motif – High-throughput in vitro	TAATTR
ETS1	ENSG00000134954	Ets	Known motif – High-throughput in vitro	RCCGGAWRYRYWTCCGSH
ETS2	ENSG00000157557	Ets	Known motif – High-throughput in vitro	ACCGGAWGYRCWTCCGGT
ETV1	ENSG00000006468	Ets	Known motif – High-throughput in vitro	RCCGGAWRY
ETV2	ENSG00000105672	Ets	Known motif – High-throughput in vitro	DACCGGAARYD
ETV3	ENSG00000117036	Ets	Known motif – High-throughput in vitro	AHCGGAWWTCCGNT
ETV3L	ENSG00000253831	Ets	Known motif – from protein with 100% identical DBD – in vitro	VGGAWR
ETV4	ENSG00000175832	Ets	Known motif – High-throughput in vitro	RCCGGAWGY
ETV5	ENSG00000244405	Ets	Known motif – High-throughput in vitro	DVCGGAWRY
ETV6	ENSG00000139083	Ets	Known motif – High-throughput in vitro	SCGGAASCGGAAGYR
ETV7	ENSG00000010030	Ets	Known motif – High-throughput in vitro	VVGGAAGYRCTTCCBB
EVX1	ENSG00000106038	Homeodomain	Known motif – High-throughput in vitro	TAATBRB
EVX2	ENSG00000174279	Homeodomain	Known motif – High-throughput in vitro	TAATBRB
FAM170A	ENSG00000164334	C2H2 ZF	Likely sequence specific TF according to literature or domain structure – No motif	
FAM200B	ENSG00000237765	BED ZF	Likely sequence specific TF according to literature or domain structure – No motif	
FBXL19	ENSG00000099364	CxxC	Likely sequence specific TF according to literature or domain structure – No motif	
FERD3L	ENSG00000146618	bHLH	Known motif – High-throughput in vitro	GYRMCAGCTGTBRC
FEV	ENSG00000163497	Ets	Known motif – High-throughput in vitro	ACCGGAART
FEZF1	ENSG00000128610	C2H2 ZF	Known motif – High-throughput in vitro	AAAARRRCAV
FEZF2	ENSG00000153266	C2H2 ZF	Inferred motif from similar protein – High-throughput in vitro	AAAWGAGCAATCA
FIGLA	ENSG00000183733	bHLH	Known motif – High-throughput in vitro	MCAGGTGKD
FIZ1	ENSG00000179943	C2H2 ZF	Likely sequence specific TF according to literature or domain structure – No motif	
FLI1	ENSG00000151702	Ets	Known motif – High-throughput in vitro	RCCGGAWRY
FLYWCH1	ENSG00000059122	FLYWCH	Likely sequence specific TF according to literature or domain structure – No motif	
FOS	ENSG00000170345	bZIP	Known motif – High-throughput in vitro	BRTGACGTCAYV
FOSB	ENSG00000125740	bZIP	Known motif – High-throughput in vitro	RTGACGTCAY
FOSL1	ENSG00000175592	bZIP	Known motif – High-throughput in vitro	DRTGAYRCR
FOSL2	ENSG00000075426	bZIP	Known motif – High-throughput in vitro	TKANTCAYNRTGACGTCAY
FOXA1	ENSG00000129514	Forkhead	Known motif – High-throughput in vitro	BVYTAWGTAAACAAW
FOXA2	ENSG00000125798	Forkhead	Known motif – High-throughput in vitro	HNNGTMAATATTKRYNBD
FOXA3	ENSG00000170608	Forkhead	Known motif – High-throughput in vitro	BVYTAWGTAAACAAA
FOXB1	ENSG00000171956	Forkhead	Known motif – High-throughput in vitro	WRWGTMAATATTKACWYW
FOXB2	ENSG00000204612	Forkhead	Inferred motif from similar protein – High-throughput in vitro	HWRWGYMAATATTKRCHYW
FOXC1	ENSG00000054598	Forkhead	Known motif – High-throughput in vitro	WRWRTMAAYAW
FOXC2	ENSG00000176692	Forkhead	Known motif – High-throughput in vitro	WAHRTMAAYAWW
FOXD1	ENSG00000251493	Forkhead	Known motif – from protein with 100% identical DBD – in vitro	HWASAATAAYAWW
FOXD2	ENSG00000186564	Forkhead	Known motif – High-throughput in vitro	RTAAAYA
FOXD3	ENSG00000187140	Forkhead	Known motif – High-throughput in vitro	RTAAAYA
FOXD4	ENSG00000170122	Forkhead	Inferred motif from similar protein – In vivo/Misc source	GTTAAAGCVAKTTTAA
FOXD4L1	ENSG00000184492	Forkhead	Inferred motif from similar protein – In vivo/Misc source	GTTAAAGCVAKTTTAA
FOXD4L3	ENSG00000187559	Forkhead	Inferred motif from similar protein – In vivo/Misc source	MGGTAAATCMAGGGWWT
FOXD4L4	ENSG00000184659	Forkhead	Known motif – In vivo/Misc source	MGGTAAATCMAGGGWWT
FOXD4L5	ENSG00000204779	Forkhead	Inferred motif from similar protein – In vivo/Misc source	MGGTAAATCMAGGGWWT
FOXD4L6	ENSG00000273514	Forkhead	Inferred motif from similar protein – In vivo/Misc source	MGGTAAATCMAGGGWWT
FOXE1	ENSG00000178919	Forkhead	Known motif – High-throughput in vitro	BVYTAWRYAAACAD
FOXE3	ENSG00000186790	Forkhead	Inferred motif from similar protein – High-throughput in vitro	BVYTAWRYAAACAD
FOXF1	ENSG00000103241	Forkhead	Known motif – In vivo/Misc source	YRHATAAACAHNB
FOXF2	ENSG00000137273	Forkhead	Known motif – In vivo/Misc source	BNHNBRTAAACAHNV
FOXG1	ENSG00000176165	Forkhead	Known motif – High-throughput in vitro	RTAAACAH
FOXH1	ENSG00000160973	Forkhead	Known motif – In vivo/Misc source	BNSAATMCACA
FOXI1	ENSG00000168269	Forkhead	Known motif – High-throughput in vitro	RTMAACA
FOXI2	ENSG00000186766	Forkhead	Inferred motif from similar protein – High-throughput in vitro	RTMAACA
FOXI3	ENSG00000214336	Forkhead	Inferred motif from similar protein – High-throughput in vitro	RTMAACA
FOXJ1	ENSG00000129654	Forkhead	Known motif – from protein with 100% identical DBD – in vitro	HAAACAAA
FOXJ2	ENSG00000065970	Forkhead	Known motif – High-throughput in vitro	GTAAACAWMAACA
FOXJ3	ENSG00000198815	Forkhead	Known motif – High-throughput in vitro	RTAAACAW
FOXK1	ENSG00000164916	Forkhead	Known motif – High-throughput in vitro	RWMMAYA
FOXK2	ENSG00000141568	Forkhead	Inferred motif from similar protein – High-throughput in vitro	RWMAACAA
FOXL1	ENSG00000176678	Forkhead	Known motif – High-throughput in vitro	RTAAACA
FOXL2	ENSG00000183770	Forkhead	Known motif – High-throughput in vitro	VBGHMAACAH
FOXM1	ENSG00000111206	Forkhead	Known motif – from protein with 100% identical DBD – in vitro	RWHR
FOXN1	ENSG00000109101	Forkhead	Known motif – In vivo/Misc source	WVBSACGCB
FOXN2	ENSG00000170802	Forkhead	Known motif – High-throughput in vitro	GCGTSNNNNNSACGC
FOXN3	ENSG00000053254	Forkhead	Known motif – High-throughput in vitro	GTAAACAA
FOXN4	ENSG00000139445	Forkhead	Known motif – In vivo/Misc source	WHNWRRNGACGCYATNHM
FOXO1	ENSG00000150907	Forkhead	Known motif – High-throughput in vitro	RTAAACATGTTTAC
FOXO3	ENSG00000118689	Forkhead	Known motif – High-throughput in vitro	GTAAACAW
FOXO4	ENSG00000184481	Forkhead	Known motif – High-throughput in vitro	GTAAACA
FOXO6	ENSG00000204060	Forkhead	Known motif – High-throughput in vitro	GTAAACATGTTTAC
FOXP1	ENSG00000114861	Forkhead	Known motif – High-throughput in vitro	TGTTTRYNRTNNNNNNBNAYRVWMAACA
FOXP2	ENSG00000128573	Forkhead	Known motif – High-throughput in vitro	RTAAAYAW
FOXP3	ENSG00000049768	Forkhead	Known motif – High-throughput in vitro	RTAAACA
FOXP4	ENSG00000137166	Forkhead	Inferred motif from similar protein – High-throughput in vitro	RTMAAYA
FOXQ1	ENSG00000164379	Forkhead	Known motif – High-throughput in vitro	YWRHRTAAACWD
FOXR1	ENSG00000176302	Forkhead	Known motif – High-throughput in vitro	CAADY
FOXR2	ENSG00000189299	Forkhead	Known motif – High-throughput in vitro	RYRTAWACATAAAWRHH
FOXS1	ENSG00000179772	Forkhead	Inferred motif from similar protein – High-throughput in vitro	HNNRHMAAYA
GABPA	ENSG00000154727	Ets	Known motif – High-throughput in vitro	RSCGGAWRY
GATA1	ENSG00000102145	GATA	Known motif – High-throughput in vitro	GATWASMH
GATA2	ENSG00000179348	GATA	Known motif – High-throughput in vitro	VHGATAHSV
GATA3	ENSG00000107485	GATA	Known motif – High-throughput in vitro	HGATAAVV
GATA4	ENSG00000136574	GATA	Known motif – High-throughput in vitro	HGATAAVV
GATA5	ENSG00000130700	GATA	Known motif – High-throughput in vitro	HGATAASV
GATA6	ENSG00000141448	GATA	Known motif – High-throughput in vitro	HGATAABVATCD
GATAD2A	ENSG00000167491	GATA	Likely sequence specific TF according to literature or domain structure – No motif	
GATAD2B	ENSG00000143614	GATA	Likely sequence specific TF according to literature or domain structure – No motif	
GBX1	ENSG00000164900	Homeodomain	Known motif – High-throughput in vitro	BTAATTRSB
GBX2	ENSG00000168505	Homeodomain	Known motif – High-throughput in vitro	TAATTR
GCM1	ENSG00000137270	GCM	Known motif – High-throughput in vitro	BATGCGGGTRS
GCM2	ENSG00000124827	GCM	Known motif – High-throughput in vitro	HRCCCGCAT
GFI1	ENSG00000162676	C2H2 ZF	Known motif – High-throughput in vitro	BMAATCACDGCNHBBCACTM
GFI1B	ENSG00000165702	C2H2 ZF	Known motif – High-throughput in vitro	MAATCASDGCNNBBCACT
GLI1	ENSG00000111087	C2H2 ZF	Known motif – In vivo/Misc source	SMCCHCCCA
GLI2	ENSG00000074047	C2H2 ZF	Known motif – High-throughput in vitro	GMCCACMCANVNHB
GLI3	ENSG00000106571	C2H2 ZF	Known motif – High-throughput in vitro	VGACCACCCACVNHG
GLI4	ENSG00000250571	C2H2 ZF	Known motif – In vivo/Misc source	RRGCCTTGAATGCCANGNYMA
GLIS1	ENSG00000174332	C2H2 ZF	Known motif – High-throughput in vitro	MGACCCCCCACGWHG
GLIS2	ENSG00000126603	C2H2 ZF	Known motif – High-throughput in vitro	KACCCCCCRCRDHG
GLIS3	ENSG00000107249	C2H2 ZF	Known motif – High-throughput in vitro	KACCCCCCACRAAG
GLMP	ENSG00000198715	Unknown	Likely sequence specific TF according to literature or domain structure – No motif	
GLYR1	ENSG00000140632	AT hook	Likely sequence specific TF according to literature or domain structure – No motif	
GMEB1	ENSG00000162419	SAND	Known motif – High-throughput in vitro	KTACGTAMNKTACGTMM
GMEB2	ENSG00000101216	SAND	Known motif – High-throughput in vitro	YBACGYAM
GPBP1	ENSG00000062194	Unknown	Likely sequence specific TF according to literature or domain structure – No motif	
GPBP1L1	ENSG00000159592	Unknown	Likely sequence specific TF according to literature or domain structure – No motif	
GRHL1	ENSG00000134317	Grainyhead	Known motif – High-throughput in vitro	DAACCGGTTH
GRHL2	ENSG00000083307	Grainyhead	Known motif – In vivo/Misc source	RAACHDGHHHDDCHDGTTY
GRHL3	ENSG00000158055	Grainyhead	Likely sequence specific TF according to literature or domain structure – No motif	
GSC	ENSG00000133937	Homeodomain	Known motif – High-throughput in vitro	HTAATCC
GSC2	ENSG00000063515	Homeodomain	Known motif – High-throughput in vitro	HTAATCCBH
GSX1	ENSG00000169840	Homeodomain	Known motif – High-throughput in vitro	TAATKR
GSX2	ENSG00000180613	Homeodomain	Known motif – High-throughput in vitro	TAATKR
GTF2B	ENSG00000137947	Unknown	Known motif – In vivo/Misc source	STYWYAKASTS
GTF2I	ENSG00000263001	GTF2I-like	Known motif – In vivo/Misc source	VAGVDVKTSH
GTF2IRD1	ENSG00000006704	GTF2I-like	Known motif – In vivo/Misc source	TRTCGCWG
GTF2IRD2	ENSG00000196275	GTF2I-like	Likely sequence specific TF according to literature or domain structure – No motif	
GTF2IRD2B	ENSG00000174428	GTF2I-like	Likely sequence specific TF according to literature or domain structure – No motif	
GTF3A	ENSG00000122034	C2H2 ZF	Known motif – High-throughput in vitro	GGATGGGAG
GZF1	ENSG00000125812	C2H2 ZF	Known motif – In vivo/Misc source	TATAKAVGCGCA
HAND1	ENSG00000113196	bHLH	Known motif – In vivo/Misc source	DBRTCTGGHWDH
HAND2	ENSG00000164107	bHLH	Known motif – High-throughput in vitro	HVCAGGTGTK
HBP1	ENSG00000105856	HMG/Sox	Known motif – from protein with 100% identical DBD – in vitro	DD
HDX	ENSG00000165259	Homeodomain	Known motif – High-throughput in vitro	H
HELT	ENSG00000187821	bHLH	Inferred motif from similar protein – High-throughput in vitro	BBCACGTGY
HES1	ENSG00000114315	bHLH	Known motif – High-throughput in vitro	KDCRCGTGBB
HES2	ENSG00000069812	bHLH	Known motif – High-throughput in vitro	VRCACGTGCC
HES3	ENSG00000173673	bHLH	Inferred motif from similar protein – High-throughput in vitro	KDCRCGTGBB
HES4	ENSG00000188290	bHLH	Inferred motif from similar protein – High-throughput in vitro	KDCRCGTGBB
HES5	ENSG00000197921	bHLH	Known motif – High-throughput in vitro	HGGCACGTGYCR
HES6	ENSG00000144485	bHLH	Known motif – High-throughput in vitro	DACACGTGCC
HES7	ENSG00000179111	bHLH	Known motif – High-throughput in vitro	YGGCACGTGCCR
HESX1	ENSG00000163666	Homeodomain	Known motif – High-throughput in vitro	HTAATTRVH
HEY1	ENSG00000164683	bHLH	Known motif – High-throughput in vitro	BBCRCGYGY
HEY2	ENSG00000135547	bHLH	Known motif – High-throughput in vitro	BCACGTGB
HEYL	ENSG00000163909	bHLH	Inferred motif from similar protein – High-throughput in vitro	BCACGTGB
HHEX	ENSG00000152804	Homeodomain	Inferred motif from similar protein – High-throughput in vitro	ATND
HIC1	ENSG00000177374	C2H2 ZF	Known motif – High-throughput in vitro	RTGCCMMC
HIC2	ENSG00000169635	C2H2 ZF	Known motif – High-throughput in vitro	BKGGCAY
HIF1A	ENSG00000100644	bHLH	Known motif – In vivo/Misc source	VVNGCACGTMBNS
HIF3A	ENSG00000124440	bHLH	Inferred motif from similar protein – In vivo/Misc source	RWAWWTMATAWCST
HINFP	ENSG00000172273	C2H2 ZF	Known motif – High-throughput in vitro	GCGGACGYTRSRRCGTCCGC
HIVEP1	ENSG00000095951	C2H2 ZF	Known motif – In vivo/Misc source	KGRRRARTCCCB
HIVEP2	ENSG00000010818	C2H2 ZF	Known motif – In vivo/Misc source	KBYDNGGHAABNSS
HIVEP3	ENSG00000127124	C2H2 ZF	Inferred motif from similar protein – In vivo/Misc source	KBYDNGGHAABNSS
HKR1	ENSG00000181666	C2H2 ZF	Known motif – High-throughput in vitro	VBKVRVNRDGGAGGRBVNVR
HLF	ENSG00000108924	bZIP	Known motif – High-throughput in vitro	VTTAYRTAAY
HLX	ENSG00000136630	Homeodomain	Known motif – from protein with 100% identical DBD – in vitro	AWND
HMBOX1	ENSG00000147421	Homeodomain	Known motif – High-throughput in vitro	VYTAGTTAMV
HMG20A	ENSG00000140382	HMG/Sox	Likely sequence specific TF according to literature or domain structure – No motif	
HMG20B	ENSG00000064961	HMG/Sox	Inferred motif from similar protein – High-throughput in vitro	WDWATAAT
HMGA1	ENSG00000137309	AT hook	Known motif – In vivo/Misc source	WATTWW
HMGA2	ENSG00000149948	AT hook	Known motif – In vivo/Misc source	ATATTSSSSDWWAWT
HMGN3	ENSG00000118418	HMG/Sox	Likely sequence specific TF according to literature or domain structure – No motif	
HMX1	ENSG00000215612	Homeodomain	Known motif – High-throughput in vitro	TTAAKTGNY
HMX2	ENSG00000188816	Homeodomain	Known motif – High-throughput in vitro	TTAAKTG
HMX3	ENSG00000188620	Homeodomain	Known motif – High-throughput in vitro	TAAKTG
HNF1A	ENSG00000135100	Homeodomain	Known motif – High-throughput in vitro	GTTAATNATTAAY
HNF1B	ENSG00000275410	Homeodomain	Known motif – High-throughput in vitro	GTTAATNATTAAY
HNF4A	ENSG00000101076	Nuclear receptor	Known motif – High-throughput in vitro	VRGGTCAAAGTCCA
HNF4G	ENSG00000164749	Nuclear receptor	Known motif – In vivo/Misc source	GDNCAAAGKYCA
HOMEZ	ENSG00000215271	Homeodomain	Known motif – High-throughput in vitro	WWWAATCGTTTW
HOXA1	ENSG00000105991	Homeodomain	Known motif – High-throughput in vitro	TAATTR
HOXA10	ENSG00000253293	Homeodomain	Known motif – High-throughput in vitro	TTWAYGAY
HOXA11	ENSG00000005073	Homeodomain	Known motif – High-throughput in vitro	DWTTTACGACB
HOXA13	ENSG00000106031	Homeodomain	Known motif – High-throughput in vitro	DTTTTATKRS
HOXA2	ENSG00000105996	Homeodomain	Known motif – High-throughput in vitro	BTAATKR
HOXA3	ENSG00000105997	Homeodomain	Known motif – from protein with 100% identical DBD – in vitro	TAATKR
HOXA4	ENSG00000197576	Homeodomain	Known motif – High-throughput in vitro	TAATKRY
HOXA5	ENSG00000106004	Homeodomain	Known motif – High-throughput in vitro	STAATKRS
HOXA6	ENSG00000106006	Homeodomain	Known motif – High-throughput in vitro	TAATKRV
HOXA7	ENSG00000122592	Homeodomain	Known motif – High-throughput in vitro	TAATKRV
HOXA9	ENSG00000078399	Homeodomain	Known motif – High-throughput in vitro	DTTWAYGAY
HOXB1	ENSG00000120094	Homeodomain	Known motif – High-throughput in vitro	STAATTA
HOXB13	ENSG00000159184	Homeodomain	Known motif – High-throughput in vitro	TTWAYDD
HOXB2	ENSG00000173917	Homeodomain	Known motif – High-throughput in vitro	TAATKR
HOXB3	ENSG00000120093	Homeodomain	Known motif – High-throughput in vitro	BTAATKR
HOXB4	ENSG00000182742	Homeodomain	Known motif – High-throughput in vitro	YTAATKAY
HOXB5	ENSG00000120075	Homeodomain	Known motif – High-throughput in vitro	TAATKRV
HOXB6	ENSG00000108511	Homeodomain	Known motif – High-throughput in vitro	TAATKRY
HOXB7	ENSG00000260027	Homeodomain	Known motif – High-throughput in vitro	BTAATKRV
HOXB8	ENSG00000120068	Homeodomain	Known motif – High-throughput in vitro	TAATKRM
HOXB9	ENSG00000170689	Homeodomain	Known motif – High-throughput in vitro	WTTTAYGAY
HOXC10	ENSG00000180818	Homeodomain	Known motif – High-throughput in vitro	WTTWAYGAB
HOXC11	ENSG00000123388	Homeodomain	Known motif – High-throughput in vitro	WTTWAYGAYH
HOXC12	ENSG00000123407	Homeodomain	Known motif – High-throughput in vitro	DTTTTACGAYY
HOXC13	ENSG00000123364	Homeodomain	Known motif – High-throughput in vitro	CTCGTAAAAH
HOXC4	ENSG00000198353	Homeodomain	Known motif – High-throughput in vitro	TAATKR
HOXC5	ENSG00000172789	Homeodomain	Known motif – from protein with 100% identical DBD – in vitro	WRATND
HOXC6	ENSG00000197757	Homeodomain	Known motif – from protein with 100% identical DBD – in vitro	TTAATTAB
HOXC8	ENSG00000037965	Homeodomain	Known motif – High-throughput in vitro	YAATTR
HOXC9	ENSG00000180806	Homeodomain	Known motif – High-throughput in vitro	TTTTACGAC
HOXD1	ENSG00000128645	Homeodomain	Known motif – High-throughput in vitro	BTAATTAV
HOXD10	ENSG00000128710	Homeodomain	Known motif – High-throughput in vitro	DTTTTACGACY
HOXD11	ENSG00000128713	Homeodomain	Known motif – High-throughput in vitro	DWTTTACGAY
HOXD12	ENSG00000170178	Homeodomain	Known motif – High-throughput in vitro	DTTTACGAY
HOXD13	ENSG00000128714	Homeodomain	Known motif – High-throughput in vitro	BCTCGTAAAAH
HOXD3	ENSG00000128652	Homeodomain	Known motif – High-throughput in vitro	CTAATTAS
HOXD4	ENSG00000170166	Homeodomain	Known motif – High-throughput in vitro	TMATKRV
HOXD8	ENSG00000175879	Homeodomain	Known motif – High-throughput in vitro	HWMATTWDB
HOXD9	ENSG00000128709	Homeodomain	Known motif – High-throughput in vitro	TTTTATKRC
HSF1	ENSG00000185122	HSF	Known motif – High-throughput in vitro	VGAABVTTCBVGAW
HSF2	ENSG00000025156	HSF	Known motif – High-throughput in vitro	VGAANNTTCBVGAA
HSF4	ENSG00000102878	HSF	Known motif – High-throughput in vitro	GAANNTTCBVGAA
HSF5	ENSG00000176160	HSF	Known motif – High-throughput in vitro	RCGTTCTAGAAYGY
HSFX1	ENSG00000171116	HSF	Likely sequence specific TF according to literature or domain structure – No motif	
HSFX2	ENSG00000268738	HSF	Likely sequence specific TF according to literature or domain structure – No motif	
HSFY1	ENSG00000172468	HSF	Known motif – High-throughput in vitro	DTVGAAYGWTTCGAAYGB
HSFY2	ENSG00000169953	HSF	Known motif – High-throughput in vitro	DTCGAAHSNWTCGAW
IKZF1	ENSG00000185811	C2H2 ZF	Known motif – In vivo/Misc source	BTGGGARD
IKZF2	ENSG00000030419	C2H2 ZF	Known motif – In vivo/Misc source	HDWHGGGADD
IKZF3	ENSG00000161405	C2H2 ZF	Known motif – High-throughput in vitro	VSNNGGGAA
IKZF4	ENSG00000123411	C2H2 ZF	Inferred motif from similar protein – In vivo/Misc source	HDWHGGGADD
IKZF5	ENSG00000095574	C2H2 ZF	Inferred motif from similar protein – In vivo/Misc source	MYYATGCAGRGT
INSM1	ENSG00000173404	C2H2 ZF	Known motif – In vivo/Misc source	YRMCCCCWKRCA
INSM2	ENSG00000168348	C2H2 ZF	Likely sequence specific TF according to literature or domain structure – No motif	
IRF1	ENSG00000125347	IRF	Known motif – In vivo/Misc source	GAAASTGAAASY
IRF2	ENSG00000168310	IRF	Known motif – High-throughput in vitro	GAAAVYGAAAS
IRF3	ENSG00000126456	IRF	Known motif – High-throughput in vitro	HSGAAAVBGAAACYGAAAC
IRF4	ENSG00000137265	IRF	Known motif – High-throughput in vitro	HCGAAACCGAAACYW
IRF5	ENSG00000128604	IRF	Known motif – High-throughput in vitro	CGAAACCGAWACH
IRF6	ENSG00000117595	IRF	Known motif – High-throughput in vitro	RGTWTCRNNNNNNCGAWACY
IRF7	ENSG00000185507	IRF	Known motif – High-throughput in vitro	CGAAAVYGAAANY
IRF8	ENSG00000140968	IRF	Known motif – High-throughput in vitro	CGAAACYGAAACY
IRF9	ENSG00000213928	IRF	Known motif – High-throughput in vitro	AWCGAAACCGAAACY
IRX1	ENSG00000170549	Homeodomain	Known motif – High-throughput in vitro	DDCRHNNNNNNNNDYGHH
IRX2	ENSG00000170561	Homeodomain	Known motif – High-throughput in vitro	DTGTYRTGTH
IRX3	ENSG00000177508	Homeodomain	Known motif – High-throughput in vitro	DACAHGNWWWWNCDTGTH
IRX4	ENSG00000113430	Homeodomain	Known motif – from protein with 100% identical DBD – in vitro	DAMAH
IRX5	ENSG00000176842	Homeodomain	Known motif – High-throughput in vitro	DTGTYRTGTH
IRX6	ENSG00000159387	Homeodomain	Inferred motif from similar protein – High-throughput in vitro	DAMAH
ISL1	ENSG00000016082	Homeodomain	Known motif – High-throughput in vitro	BTAAKTGS
ISL2	ENSG00000159556	Homeodomain	Known motif – High-throughput in vitro	YTAAKTGB
ISX	ENSG00000175329	Homeodomain	Known motif – High-throughput in vitro	CYAATTAV
JAZF1	ENSG00000153814	C2H2 ZF	Likely sequence specific TF according to literature or domain structure – No motif	
JDP2	ENSG00000140044	bZIP	Known motif – High-throughput in vitro	RTKACRTMAY
JRK	ENSG00000234616	CENPB	Likely sequence specific TF according to literature or domain structure – No motif	
JRKL	ENSG00000183340	CENPB	Inferred motif from similar protein – High-throughput in vitro	RCGGWWR
JUN	ENSG00000177606	bZIP	Known motif – High-throughput in vitro	DATGACGTMAHNV
JUNB	ENSG00000171223	bZIP	Known motif – High-throughput in vitro	RTKACGTMAY
JUND	ENSG00000130522	bZIP	Known motif – High-throughput in vitro	VTGACGTMA
KAT7	ENSG00000136504	C2H2 ZF	Likely sequence specific TF according to literature or domain structure – No motif	
KCMF1	ENSG00000176407	C2H2 ZF	Likely sequence specific TF according to literature or domain structure – No motif	
KCNIP3	ENSG00000115041	Unknown	Likely sequence specific TF according to literature or domain structure – No motif	
KDM2A	ENSG00000173120	CxxC	Likely sequence specific TF according to literature or domain structure – No motif	
KDM2B	ENSG00000089094	CxxC	Known motif – High-throughput in vitro	CG
KDM5B	ENSG00000117139	ARID/BRIGHT	Likely sequence specific TF according to literature or domain structure – No motif	
KIN	ENSG00000151657	C2H2 ZF	Likely sequence specific TF according to literature or domain structure – No motif	
KLF1	ENSG00000105610	C2H2 ZF	Known motif – High-throughput in vitro	CMCGCCCM
KLF10	ENSG00000155090	C2H2 ZF	Known motif – High-throughput in vitro	RMCACRCCCMYVHCACRCCCMC
KLF11	ENSG00000172059	C2H2 ZF	Known motif – High-throughput in vitro	VMCMCRCCCMYNMCACGCCCMC
KLF12	ENSG00000118922	C2H2 ZF	Known motif – High-throughput in vitro	DRCCACGCCCH
KLF13	ENSG00000169926	C2H2 ZF	Known motif – High-throughput in vitro	RCCACRCCCMC
KLF14	ENSG00000266265	C2H2 ZF	Known motif – High-throughput in vitro	DRHCACGCCCMYYH
KLF15	ENSG00000163884	C2H2 ZF	Known motif – High-throughput in vitro	VHCMCVCCCMY
KLF16	ENSG00000129911	C2H2 ZF	Known motif – High-throughput in vitro	VMCMCDCCCMC
KLF17	ENSG00000171872	C2H2 ZF	Known motif – High-throughput in vitro	MMCCACVCWCCCMTY
KLF2	ENSG00000127528	C2H2 ZF	Known motif – High-throughput in vitro	VCCMCRCCCH
KLF3	ENSG00000109787	C2H2 ZF	Known motif – High-throughput in vitro	RRCCRCGCCCH
KLF4	ENSG00000136826	C2H2 ZF	Known motif – High-throughput in vitro	VCCACRCCCH
KLF5	ENSG00000102554	C2H2 ZF	Known motif – High-throughput in vitro	MCACRCCCH
KLF6	ENSG00000067082	C2H2 ZF	Known motif – High-throughput in vitro	VMCACRCCCH
KLF7	ENSG00000118263	C2H2 ZF	Known motif – from protein with 100% identical DBD – in vitro	HHMCRCCCH
KLF8	ENSG00000102349	C2H2 ZF	Known motif – from protein with 100% identical DBD – in vitro	MCRCCY
KLF9	ENSG00000119138	C2H2 ZF	Known motif – from protein with 100% identical DBD – in vitro	TAACGG
KMT2A	ENSG00000118058	CxxC; AT hook	Known motif – High-throughput in vitro	HNCGNB
KMT2B	ENSG00000272333	CxxC; AT hook	Likely sequence specific TF according to literature or domain structure – No motif	
L3MBTL1	ENSG00000185513	C2H2 ZF	Likely sequence specific TF according to literature or domain structure – No motif	
L3MBTL3	ENSG00000198945	C2H2 ZF	Likely sequence specific TF according to literature or domain structure – No motif	
L3MBTL4	ENSG00000154655	C2H2 ZF	Likely sequence specific TF according to literature or domain structure – No motif	
LBX1	ENSG00000138136	Homeodomain	Known motif – High-throughput in vitro	TAAYTRG
LBX2	ENSG00000179528	Homeodomain	Known motif – High-throughput in vitro	TAATTRV
LCOR	ENSG00000196233	Pipsqueak	Known motif – from protein with 100% identical DBD – in vitro	YNAAW
LCORL	ENSG00000178177	Pipsqueak	Known motif – High-throughput in vitro	HYNAAWH
LEF1	ENSG00000138795	HMG/Sox	Known motif – High-throughput in vitro	SATCAAAS
LEUTX	ENSG00000213921	Homeodomain	Likely sequence specific TF according to literature or domain structure – No motif	
LHX1	ENSG00000273706	Homeodomain	Known motif – High-throughput in vitro	TRATBR
LHX2	ENSG00000106689	Homeodomain	Known motif – High-throughput in vitro	HHDTTR
LHX3	ENSG00000107187	Homeodomain	Known motif – from protein with 100% identical DBD – in vitro	YAATHW
LHX4	ENSG00000121454	Homeodomain	Known motif – High-throughput in vitro	BYRATTRV
LHX5	ENSG00000089116	Homeodomain	Known motif – High-throughput in vitro	TAATTRS
LHX6	ENSG00000106852	Homeodomain	Known motif – High-throughput in vitro	TRATTR
LHX8	ENSG00000162624	Homeodomain	Known motif – High-throughput in vitro	STAATTA
LHX9	ENSG00000143355	Homeodomain	Known motif – High-throughput in vitro	TAATTRG
LIN28A	ENSG00000131914	CSD	Inferred motif from similar protein – High-throughput in vitro	CGCHGYYHYWYCGCG
LIN28B	ENSG00000187772	CSD	Known motif – High-throughput in vitro	CGCHGYYHYWYCGCG
LIN54	ENSG00000189308	TCR/CxC	Inferred motif from similar protein – High-throughput in vitro	RTTYAAAH
LMX1A	ENSG00000162761	Homeodomain	Known motif – High-throughput in vitro	BTAATTA
LMX1B	ENSG00000136944	Homeodomain	Known motif – High-throughput in vitro	TWATTR
LTF	ENSG00000012223	Unknown	Known motif – In vivo/Misc source	GKVACTKB
LYL1	ENSG00000104903	bHLH	Inferred motif from similar protein – In vivo/Misc source	RNCAGVTGGH
MAF	ENSG00000178573	bZIP	Known motif – High-throughput in vitro	TGCTGACDHDRCR
MAFA	ENSG00000182759	bZIP	Known motif – High-throughput in vitro	WWWNTGCTGACD
MAFB	ENSG00000204103	bZIP	Known motif – from protein with 100% identical DBD – in vitro	TGCTGAC
MAFF	ENSG00000185022	bZIP	Known motif – High-throughput in vitro	YGCTGASTCAGCR
MAFG	ENSG00000197063	bZIP	Known motif – High-throughput in vitro	YGCTGABNDNGCR
MAFK	ENSG00000198517	bZIP	Known motif – High-throughput in vitro	DNNYGCTKAVTCAGCRNNH
MAX	ENSG00000125952	bHLH	Known motif – High-throughput in vitro	CACGTG
MAZ	ENSG00000103495	C2H2 ZF	Known motif – High-throughput in vitro	GGGMGGGGS
MBD1	ENSG00000141644	MBD; CxxC ZF	Likely sequence specific TF according to literature or domain structure – No motif	
MBD2	ENSG00000134046	MBD	Known motif – In vivo/Misc source	VSGKCCGGMKR
MBD3	ENSG00000071655	MBD	Likely sequence specific TF according to literature or domain structure – No motif	
MBD4	ENSG00000129071	MBD	Likely sequence specific TF according to literature or domain structure – No motif	
MBD6	ENSG00000166987	MBD	Likely sequence specific TF according to literature or domain structure – No motif	
MBNL2	ENSG00000139793	CCCH ZF	Likely sequence specific TF according to literature or domain structure – High-throughput in vitro	YGCYTYGCYTH
MECOM	ENSG00000085276	C2H2 ZF	Known motif – In vivo/Misc source	WGAYAAGATAANAND
MECP2	ENSG00000169057	MBD; AT hook	Known motif – from protein with 100% identical DBD – in vitro	DTD
MEF2A	ENSG00000068305	MADS box	Known motif – High-throughput in vitro	KCTAWAAATAGM
MEF2B	ENSG00000213999	MADS box	Known motif – High-throughput in vitro	TGTTACCATAWHBGG
MEF2C	ENSG00000081189	MADS box	Known motif – High-throughput in vitro	TWCTAWAAATAG
MEF2D	ENSG00000116604	MADS box	Known motif – High-throughput in vitro	DCTAWAAATAGM
MEIS1	ENSG00000143995	Homeodomain	Known motif – High-throughput in vitro	TGACA
MEIS2	ENSG00000134138	Homeodomain	Known motif – High-throughput in vitro	TGACASSTGTC
MEIS3	ENSG00000105419	Homeodomain	Known motif – High-throughput in vitro	TGACAGSTGTCA
MEOX1	ENSG00000005102	Homeodomain	Known motif – High-throughput in vitro	STAATTA
MEOX2	ENSG00000106511	Homeodomain	Known motif – High-throughput in vitro	STMATYA
MESP1	ENSG00000166823	bHLH	Known motif – High-throughput in vitro	HVCACCTGB
MESP2	ENSG00000188095	bHLH	Known motif – High-throughput in vitro	AMCATATGKYR
MGA	ENSG00000174197	T-box	Known motif – High-throughput in vitro	AGGTGTKAHDTMACACCT
MITF	ENSG00000187098	bHLH	Known motif – from protein with 100% identical DBD – in vitro	RTCACGHG
MIXL1	ENSG00000185155	Homeodomain	Known motif – High-throughput in vitro	TAATTR
MKX	ENSG00000150051	Homeodomain	Likely sequence specific TF according to literature or domain structure – No motif	
MLX	ENSG00000108788	bHLH	Known motif – High-throughput in vitro	VCACGTGVY
MLXIP	ENSG00000175727	bHLH	Inferred motif from similar protein – High-throughput in vitro	HCACGTGV
MLXIPL	ENSG00000009950	bHLH	Known motif – High-throughput in vitro	DDCACGTGNH
MNT	ENSG00000070444	bHLH	Known motif – High-throughput in vitro	DNCACGTGB
MNX1	ENSG00000130675	Homeodomain	Known motif – High-throughput in vitro	HTAATTRNH
MSANTD1	ENSG00000188981	MADF	Likely sequence specific TF according to literature or domain structure – No motif	
MSANTD3	ENSG00000066697	MADF	Known motif – High-throughput in vitro	SBNCACTCAM
MSANTD4	ENSG00000170903	Myb/SANT	Likely sequence specific TF according to literature or domain structure – No motif	
MSC	ENSG00000178860	bHLH	Known motif – High-throughput in vitro	RMCAGCTGBYV
MSGN1	ENSG00000151379	bHLH	Known motif – High-throughput in vitro	VMCAWWTGGY
MSX1	ENSG00000163132	Homeodomain	Known motif – High-throughput in vitro	TAATTR
MSX2	ENSG00000120149	Homeodomain	Known motif – High-throughput in vitro	TAATTGB
MTERF1	ENSG00000127989	mTERF	Known motif – In vivo/Misc source	TGGTAVWRKTYGGT
MTERF2	ENSG00000120832	mTERF	Likely sequence specific TF according to literature or domain structure – No motif	
MTERF3	ENSG00000156469	mTERF	Likely sequence specific TF according to literature or domain structure – No motif	
MTERF4	ENSG00000122085	mTERF	Likely sequence specific TF according to literature or domain structure – No motif	
MTF1	ENSG00000188786	C2H2 ZF	Known motif – High-throughput in vitro	TTTGCACACGGCAC
MTF2	ENSG00000143033	Unknown	Known motif – High-throughput in vitro	
MXD1	ENSG00000059728	bHLH	Inferred motif from similar protein – In vivo/Misc source	CACGTGAY
MXD3	ENSG00000213347	bHLH	Inferred motif from similar protein – In vivo/Misc source	CACGTGAY
MXD4	ENSG00000123933	bHLH	Inferred motif from similar protein – In vivo/Misc source	CACGTGAY
MXI1	ENSG00000119950	bHLH	Known motif – In vivo/Misc source	CCACGTGG
MYB	ENSG00000118513	Myb/SANT	Known motif – In vivo/Misc source	BAACKGNH
MYBL1	ENSG00000185697	Myb/SANT	Known motif – High-throughput in vitro	HRACCGTTW
MYBL2	ENSG00000101057	Myb/SANT	Known motif – High-throughput in vitro	WAACGGTY
MYC	ENSG00000136997	bHLH	Known motif – In vivo/Misc source	RCCACGTGSB
MYCL	ENSG00000116990	bHLH	Inferred motif from similar protein – In vivo/Misc source	RCCACGTG
MYCN	ENSG00000134323	bHLH	Known motif – High-throughput in vitro	VCACGTG
MYF5	ENSG00000111049	bHLH	Known motif – In vivo/Misc source	VCWSCASSTGYCW
MYF6	ENSG00000111046	bHLH	Known motif – High-throughput in vitro	RACASSTGWYV
MYNN	ENSG00000085274	C2H2 ZF	Known motif – High-throughput in vitro	AAAWTAARAGYC
MYOD1	ENSG00000129152	bHLH	Known motif – High-throughput in vitro	YGHCAGSTGKYV
MYOG	ENSG00000122180	bHLH	Known motif – High-throughput in vitro	RACARCTGWCR
MYPOP	ENSG00000176182	Myb/SANT	Likely sequence specific TF according to literature or domain structure – No motif	
MYRF	ENSG00000124920	Ndt80/PhoG	Known motif – High-throughput in vitro	TGGTACCA
MYRFL	ENSG00000166268	Ndt80/PhoG	Likely sequence specific TF according to literature or domain structure – No motif	
MYSM1	ENSG00000162601	Myb/SANT	Likely sequence specific TF according to literature or domain structure – No motif	
MYT1	ENSG00000196132	C2H2 ZF	Likely sequence specific TF according to literature or domain structure – No motif	
MYT1L	ENSG00000186487	C2H2 ZF	Inferred motif from similar protein – High-throughput in vitro	VAAGTTT
MZF1	ENSG00000099326	C2H2 ZF	Known motif – In vivo/Misc source	DRDGGGGAD
NACC2	ENSG00000148411	Unknown	Likely sequence specific TF according to literature or domain structure – No motif	
NAIF1	ENSG00000171169	MADF	Inferred motif from similar protein – High-throughput in vitro	TACGYH
NANOG	ENSG00000111704	Homeodomain	Known motif – High-throughput in vitro	YRABBVB
NANOGNB	ENSG00000205857	Homeodomain	Likely sequence specific TF according to literature or domain structure – No motif	
NANOGP8	ENSG00000255192	Homeodomain	Known motif – from protein with 100% identical DBD – in vitro	YRABBVB
NCOA1	ENSG00000084676	bHLH	Likely sequence specific TF according to literature or domain structure – No motif	
NCOA2	ENSG00000140396	bHLH	Likely sequence specific TF according to literature or domain structure – No motif	
NCOA3	ENSG00000124151	bHLH	Likely sequence specific TF according to literature or domain structure – No motif	
NEUROD1	ENSG00000162992	bHLH	Known motif – High-throughput in vitro	AAWTANNNBRMCATATGKY
NEUROD2	ENSG00000171532	bHLH	Known motif – High-throughput in vitro	RMCATATGBY
NEUROD4	ENSG00000123307	bHLH	Inferred motif from similar protein – High-throughput in vitro	AAWTANNNBRMCATATGKY
NEUROD6	ENSG00000164600	bHLH	Inferred motif from similar protein – High-throughput in vitro	AAWTANNNBRMCATATGKY
NEUROG1	ENSG00000181965	bHLH	Known motif – High-throughput in vitro	RVCATATGBY
NEUROG2	ENSG00000178403	bHLH	Known motif – High-throughput in vitro	RVCATATGBY
NEUROG3	ENSG00000122859	bHLH	Inferred motif from similar protein – High-throughput in vitro	RVCATATGBY
NFAT5	ENSG00000102908	Rel	Known motif – High-throughput in vitro	RTGGAAAWKTACH
NFATC1	ENSG00000131196	Rel	Known motif – High-throughput in vitro	RTGGAAAHW
NFATC2	ENSG00000101096	Rel	Known motif – High-throughput in vitro	DYGGAAANW
NFATC3	ENSG00000072736	Rel	Known motif – High-throughput in vitro	YGGAAANH
NFATC4	ENSG00000100968	Rel	Known motif – High-throughput in vitro	YRBWWW
NFE2	ENSG00000123405	bZIP	Known motif – High-throughput in vitro	VATGACTCATB
NFE2L1	ENSG00000082641	bZIP	Known motif – In vivo/Misc source	ATGAYD
NFE2L2	ENSG00000116044	bZIP	Known motif – In vivo/Misc source	VVTGACTMAGCA
NFE2L3	ENSG00000050344	bZIP	Known motif – In vivo/Misc source	TATTWSCAAGGA
NFE4	ENSG00000230257	Unknown	Known motif – In vivo/Misc source	VHCCCKMKCCWS
NFIA	ENSG00000162599	SMAD	Known motif – High-throughput in vitro	YTGGCANNNTGCCAA
NFIB	ENSG00000147862	SMAD	Known motif – High-throughput in vitro	TTGGCANNNTGCCAR
NFIC	ENSG00000141905	SMAD	Known motif – High-throughput in vitro	YTGGCANNNNGCCAA
NFIL3	ENSG00000165030	bZIP	Known motif – High-throughput in vitro	VTTACRTAAY
NFIX	ENSG00000008441	SMAD	Known motif – High-throughput in vitro	TTGGCANNNTGCCAR
NFKB1	ENSG00000109320	Rel	Known motif – High-throughput in vitro	AGGGGAWTCCCCK
NFKB2	ENSG00000077150	Rel	Known motif – High-throughput in vitro	VGGGGAWTCCCC
NFX1	ENSG00000086102	NFX	Likely sequence specific TF according to literature or domain structure – No motif	
NFXL1	ENSG00000170448	NFX	Likely sequence specific TF according to literature or domain structure – No motif	
NFYA	ENSG00000001167	CBF/NF-Y	Known motif – In vivo/Misc source	HBSYSATTGGYYV
NFYB	ENSG00000120837	Unknown	Known motif – In vivo/Misc source	CTSATTGGYYVVNNB
NFYC	ENSG00000066136	Unknown	Known motif – In vivo/Misc source	BSTSATTGGYYR
NHLH1	ENSG00000171786	bHLH	Known motif – High-throughput in vitro	DKGRCGCAGCTGMKNCH
NHLH2	ENSG00000177551	bHLH	Known motif – High-throughput in vitro	DDGNMGCAGCTGCGYCMH
NKRF	ENSG00000186416	Unknown	Likely sequence specific TF according to literature or domain structure – No motif	
NKX1-1	ENSG00000235608	Homeodomain	Known motif – from protein with 100% identical DBD – in vitro	TAATND
NKX1-2	ENSG00000229544	Homeodomain	Known motif – from protein with 100% identical DBD – in vitro	TAAWND
NKX2-1	ENSG00000136352	Homeodomain	Known motif – from protein with 100% identical DBD – in vitro	RAGDR
NKX2-2	ENSG00000125820	Homeodomain	Known motif – from protein with 100% identical DBD – in vitro	RAGDR
NKX2-3	ENSG00000119919	Homeodomain	Known motif – High-throughput in vitro	VCACTTV
NKX2-4	ENSG00000125816	Homeodomain	Known motif – from protein with 100% identical DBD – in vitro	RAGDR
NKX2-5	ENSG00000183072	Homeodomain	Known motif – High-throughput in vitro	VCACTTRDV
NKX2-6	ENSG00000180053	Homeodomain	Inferred motif from similar protein – High-throughput in vitro	HYAAGTRB
NKX2-8	ENSG00000136327	Homeodomain	Known motif – High-throughput in vitro	BTSRAGTGB
NKX3-1	ENSG00000167034	Homeodomain	Known motif – High-throughput in vitro	TAAGTGS
NKX3-2	ENSG00000109705	Homeodomain	Known motif – High-throughput in vitro	TAAGTGS
NKX6-1	ENSG00000163623	Homeodomain	Known motif – from protein with 100% identical DBD – in vitro	DTDATNR
NKX6-2	ENSG00000148826	Homeodomain	Known motif – High-throughput in vitro	DTAATTR
NKX6-3	ENSG00000165066	Homeodomain	Known motif – High-throughput in vitro	WTAATGRB
NME2	ENSG00000243678	Unknown	Likely sequence specific TF according to literature or domain structure – No motif	
NOBOX	ENSG00000106410	Homeodomain	Known motif – High-throughput in vitro	HDATDR
NOTO	ENSG00000214513	Homeodomain	Known motif – High-throughput in vitro	YWMATTA
NPAS1	ENSG00000130751	bHLH	Inferred motif from similar protein – In vivo/Misc source	VVNGCACGTMBNS
NPAS2	ENSG00000170485	bHLH	Known motif – High-throughput in vitro	DMCACGTGY
NPAS3	ENSG00000151322	bHLH	Inferred motif from similar protein – In vivo/Misc source	VVNGCACGTMBNS
NPAS4	ENSG00000174576	bHLH	Inferred motif from similar protein – High-throughput in vitro	
NR0B1	ENSG00000169297	Unknown	Known motif – In vivo/Misc source	YBTYCCMCKS
NR1D1	ENSG00000126368	Nuclear receptor	Known motif – High-throughput in vitro	TGACCYASTRACCYANWW
NR1D2	ENSG00000174738	Nuclear receptor	Known motif – High-throughput in vitro	YRACMYANTRACMYMNWWH
NR1H2	ENSG00000131408	Nuclear receptor	Known motif – In vivo/Misc source	TAAAGGTCAAAGGTCAASK
NR1H3	ENSG00000025434	Nuclear receptor	Inferred motif from similar protein – In vivo/Misc source	TAAAGGTCAAAGGTCAASK
NR1H4	ENSG00000012504	Nuclear receptor	Known motif – High-throughput in vitro	RGKTCRTTGACCYBNNRGGTBADRGKKBNDRGKTCAHHKD
NR1I2	ENSG00000144852	Nuclear receptor	Known motif – High-throughput in vitro	YGMMCYBNNYGMMCY
NR1I3	ENSG00000143257	Nuclear receptor	Known motif – High-throughput in vitro	RGKDYRNNNNRGKKYR
NR2C1	ENSG00000120798	Nuclear receptor	Known motif – High-throughput in vitro	RGKKCRYGAMMY
NR2C2	ENSG00000177463	Nuclear receptor	Known motif – High-throughput in vitro	VRGGTCAAAGGTCA
NR2E1	ENSG00000112333	Nuclear receptor	Known motif – High-throughput in vitro	AAGTCA
NR2E3	ENSG00000278570	Nuclear receptor	Known motif – High-throughput in vitro	RAGATCAM
NR2F1	ENSG00000175745	Nuclear receptor	Known motif – High-throughput in vitro	RRGGTCAAAGGTCA
NR2F2	ENSG00000185551	Nuclear receptor	Known motif – from protein with 100% identical DBD – in vitro	RRGGTCA
NR2F6	ENSG00000160113	Nuclear receptor	Known motif – High-throughput in vitro	RGGTCAAAGGTCA
NR3C1	ENSG00000113580	Nuclear receptor	Known motif – High-throughput in vitro	RGWACAYNRTGTWCYH
NR3C2	ENSG00000151623	Nuclear receptor	Known motif – High-throughput in vitro	RGDACAHDRTGTHCY
NR4A1	ENSG00000123358	Nuclear receptor	Known motif – High-throughput in vitro	AAAGGTCA
NR4A2	ENSG00000153234	Nuclear receptor	Known motif – High-throughput in vitro	BTAAAGGTCA
NR4A3	ENSG00000119508	Nuclear receptor	Known motif – In vivo/Misc source	CAAAGGTCAS
NR5A1	ENSG00000136931	Nuclear receptor	Known motif – High-throughput in vitro	CAAGGYCR
NR5A2	ENSG00000116833	Nuclear receptor	Known motif – High-throughput in vitro	YCAAGGTCAH
NR6A1	ENSG00000148200	Nuclear receptor	Known motif – High-throughput in vitro	SAAGKTCAAGKKYR
NRF1	ENSG00000106459	Unknown	Known motif – High-throughput in vitro	YRCGCATGCGC
NRL	ENSG00000129535	bZIP	Known motif – High-throughput in vitro	DWHNYGCTGAC
OLIG1	ENSG00000184221	bHLH	Known motif – High-throughput in vitro	AVCATATGKT
OLIG2	ENSG00000205927	bHLH	Known motif – High-throughput in vitro	AMCATATGKY
OLIG3	ENSG00000177468	bHLH	Known motif – High-throughput in vitro	RSCATATGKY
ONECUT1	ENSG00000169856	CUT; Homeodomain	Known motif – High-throughput in vitro	DDTATCGATYD
ONECUT2	ENSG00000119547	CUT; Homeodomain	Known motif – High-throughput in vitro	DTATCGATCS
ONECUT3	ENSG00000205922	CUT; Homeodomain	Known motif – High-throughput in vitro	DWTATYGATTTTY
OSR1	ENSG00000143867	C2H2 ZF	Known motif – High-throughput in vitro	HACRGTAGC
OSR2	ENSG00000164920	C2H2 ZF	Known motif – High-throughput in vitro	HVCRGTAGC
OTP	ENSG00000171540	Homeodomain	Known motif – from protein with 100% identical DBD – in vitro	HAATND
OTX1	ENSG00000115507	Homeodomain	Known motif – High-throughput in vitro	TAATCSB
OTX2	ENSG00000165588	Homeodomain	Known motif – High-throughput in vitro	HTAATCCB
OVOL1	ENSG00000172818	C2H2 ZF	Known motif – High-throughput in vitro	RNRTAACGGTHH
OVOL2	ENSG00000125850	C2H2 ZF	Known motif – High-throughput in vitro	DNNTARCGGD
OVOL3	ENSG00000105261	C2H2 ZF	Likely sequence specific TF according to literature or domain structure – No motif	
PA2G4	ENSG00000170515	Unknown	Likely sequence specific TF according to literature or domain structure – No motif	
PATZ1	ENSG00000100105	C2H2 ZF; AT hook	Known motif – In vivo/Misc source	GGGHGGGG
PAX1	ENSG00000125813	Paired box	Known motif – High-throughput in vitro	SGTCACGCWTSANTGVH
PAX2	ENSG00000075891	Homeodomain; Paired box	Known motif – High-throughput in vitro	SGTCACGCWTSRNTGVNY
PAX3	ENSG00000135903	Homeodomain; Paired box	Known motif – High-throughput in vitro	TAATCRATTA
PAX4	ENSG00000106331	Homeodomain; Paired box	Known motif – High-throughput in vitro	HKAATTAR
PAX5	ENSG00000196092	Paired box	Known motif – High-throughput in vitro	GTYACGSWTSRNTRVNY
PAX6	ENSG00000007372	Homeodomain; Paired box	Known motif – High-throughput in vitro	YACGCHYSRNYRMNY
PAX7	ENSG00000009709	Homeodomain; Paired box	Known motif – High-throughput in vitro	TAATYRATTW
PAX8	ENSG00000125618	Paired box	Known motif – High-throughput in vitro	RNBYRNYSRWGCGTGACS
PAX9	ENSG00000198807	Paired box	Known motif – High-throughput in vitro	SGTCACGCWTSANTGM
PBX1	ENSG00000185630	Homeodomain	Known motif – High-throughput in vitro	TGATKGAYR
PBX2	ENSG00000204304	Homeodomain	Known motif – In vivo/Misc source	KRVHKTGATTGAWK
PBX3	ENSG00000167081	Homeodomain	Known motif – In vivo/Misc source	BBBTGATTGRYND
PBX4	ENSG00000105717	Homeodomain	Known motif – High-throughput in vitro	HDWHH
PCGF2	ENSG00000277258	Unknown	Likely sequence specific TF according to literature or domain structure – No motif	
PCGF6	ENSG00000156374	Unknown	Likely sequence specific TF according to literature or domain structure – No motif	
PDX1	ENSG00000139515	Homeodomain	Known motif – High-throughput in vitro	BTAATKR
PEG3	ENSG00000198300	C2H2 ZF	Likely sequence specific TF according to literature or domain structure – No motif	
PGR	ENSG00000082175	Nuclear receptor	Known motif – High-throughput in vitro	RGNACRNNNTGTNCH
PHF1	ENSG00000112511	Unknown	Known motif – High-throughput in vitro	
PHF19	ENSG00000119403	Unknown	Likely sequence specific TF according to literature or domain structure – No motif	
PHF20	ENSG00000025293	AT hook	Likely sequence specific TF according to literature or domain structure – No motif	
PHF21A	ENSG00000135365	AT hook	Likely sequence specific TF according to literature or domain structure – No motif	
PHOX2A	ENSG00000165462	Homeodomain	Known motif – High-throughput in vitro	TAATTRVRTTA
PHOX2B	ENSG00000109132	Homeodomain	Known motif – High-throughput in vitro	TAATTRVRTTA
PIN1	ENSG00000127445	MBD	Likely sequence specific TF according to literature or domain structure – No motif	
PITX1	ENSG00000069011	Homeodomain	Known motif – High-throughput in vitro	HTAATCC
PITX2	ENSG00000164093	Homeodomain	Known motif – High-throughput in vitro	TAAKCC
PITX3	ENSG00000107859	Homeodomain	Known motif – High-throughput in vitro	HTAATCC
PKNOX1	ENSG00000160199	Homeodomain	Known motif – High-throughput in vitro	TGACAGCTGTCA
PKNOX2	ENSG00000165495	Homeodomain	Known motif – High-throughput in vitro	TGACAGSTGTCA
PLAG1	ENSG00000181690	C2H2 ZF	Known motif – High-throughput in vitro	GGGGCCHWMGGGGG
PLAGL1	ENSG00000118495	C2H2 ZF	Known motif – In vivo/Misc source	RGGCCCCCYB
PLAGL2	ENSG00000126003	C2H2 ZF	Known motif – High-throughput in vitro	RGGGGCCC
PLSCR1	ENSG00000188313	Unknown	Likely sequence specific TF according to literature or domain structure – No motif	
POGK	ENSG00000143157	Brinker	Likely sequence specific TF according to literature or domain structure – No motif	
POU1F1	ENSG00000064835	Homeodomain; POU	Known motif – High-throughput in vitro	DWTATGCWAATKAD
POU2AF1	ENSG00000110777	Unknown	Known motif – In vivo/Misc source	GATKTGCAKAT
POU2F1	ENSG00000143190	Homeodomain; POU	Known motif – High-throughput in vitro	WTGMATATKYADD
POU2F2	ENSG00000028277	Homeodomain; POU	Known motif – High-throughput in vitro	DTGMATATKYADD
POU2F3	ENSG00000137709	Homeodomain; POU	Known motif – High-throughput in vitro	TATGYWAAT
POU3F1	ENSG00000185668	Homeodomain; POU	Known motif – High-throughput in vitro	WTATGYWAATD
POU3F2	ENSG00000184486	Homeodomain; POU	Known motif – High-throughput in vitro	WTATGYWAATKW
POU3F3	ENSG00000198914	Homeodomain; POU	Known motif – High-throughput in vitro	WWDMWTAWKHAW
POU3F4	ENSG00000196767	Homeodomain; POU	Known motif – High-throughput in vitro	WDAWTTATKCA
POU4F1	ENSG00000152192	Homeodomain; POU	Known motif – High-throughput in vitro	TDMATWATKYA
POU4F2	ENSG00000151615	Homeodomain; POU	Known motif – High-throughput in vitro	BTMATTAAWTATKCA
POU4F3	ENSG00000091010	Homeodomain; POU	Known motif – High-throughput in vitro	RTNMATWATKYAT
POU5F1	ENSG00000204531	Homeodomain; POU	Known motif – High-throughput in vitro	WTATGYWAATKWVB
POU5F1B	ENSG00000212993	Homeodomain; POU	Known motif – High-throughput in vitro	TATGYWAAT
POU5F2	ENSG00000248483	Homeodomain; POU	Likely sequence specific TF according to literature or domain structure – No motif	
POU6F1	ENSG00000184271	Homeodomain; POU	Known motif – High-throughput in vitro	MTCATTAH
POU6F2	ENSG00000106536	Homeodomain; POU	Known motif – High-throughput in vitro	DTAATKAGBH
PPARA	ENSG00000186951	Nuclear receptor	Known motif – In vivo/Misc source	DAGGTCA
PPARD	ENSG00000112033	Nuclear receptor	Known motif – High-throughput in vitro	RRGGTCAAAGGTCA
PPARG	ENSG00000132170	Nuclear receptor	Known motif – from protein with 100% identical DBD – in vitro	VNTRMCCYANWDNRACCTWTNVCCYVNW
PRDM1	ENSG00000057657	C2H2 ZF	Known motif – High-throughput in vitro	RAAAGTGAAAGTD
PRDM10	ENSG00000170325	C2H2 ZF	Likely sequence specific TF according to literature or domain structure – No motif	
PRDM12	ENSG00000130711	C2H2 ZF	Known motif – In vivo/Misc source	GACAGNTKACC
PRDM13	ENSG00000112238	C2H2 ZF	Likely sequence specific TF according to literature or domain structure – No motif	
PRDM14	ENSG00000147596	C2H2 ZF	Known motif – In vivo/Misc source	RSTTAGRGACCY
PRDM15	ENSG00000141956	C2H2 ZF	Known motif – In vivo/Misc source	DTGGAAHTCCMA
PRDM16	ENSG00000142611	C2H2 ZF	Inferred motif from similar protein – In vivo/Misc source	DAGAYAAGATAANM
PRDM2	ENSG00000116731	C2H2 ZF	Likely sequence specific TF according to literature or domain structure – No motif	
PRDM4	ENSG00000110851	C2H2 ZF	Known motif – High-throughput in vitro	TTTCAAGGCCCCC
PRDM5	ENSG00000138738	C2H2 ZF	Likely sequence specific TF according to literature or domain structure – No motif	
PRDM6	ENSG00000061455	C2H2 ZF	Known motif – In vivo/Misc source	RVARDRRAAADDVWRRAAAA
PRDM8	ENSG00000152784	C2H2 ZF	Likely sequence specific TF according to literature or domain structure – No motif	
PRDM9	ENSG00000164256	C2H2 ZF	Known motif – High-throughput in vitro	VGNGGBNRSGGDGGNNNNARVRRV
PREB	ENSG00000138073	Unknown	Likely sequence specific TF according to literature or domain structure – No motif	
PRMT3	ENSG00000185238	C2H2 ZF	Likely sequence specific TF according to literature or domain structure – No motif	
PROP1	ENSG00000175325	Homeodomain	Known motif – High-throughput in vitro	TAAYYNMATTA
PROX1	ENSG00000117707	Prospero	Known motif – High-throughput in vitro	BAAGACGYCTTV
PROX2	ENSG00000119608	Prospero	Inferred motif from similar protein – High-throughput in vitro	BAMGRCGTCDTV
PRR12	ENSG00000126464	AT hook	Likely sequence specific TF according to literature or domain structure – No motif	
PRRX1	ENSG00000116132	Homeodomain	Known motif – High-throughput in vitro	TAATTR
PRRX2	ENSG00000167157	Homeodomain	Known motif – High-throughput in vitro	TAATTRV
PTF1A	ENSG00000168267	bHLH	Known motif – High-throughput in vitro	VYGTCAGCTGTT
PURA	ENSG00000185129	Unknown	Known motif – In vivo/Misc source	CYMBGSCHNCMMMBWCC
PURB	ENSG00000146676	Unknown	Likely sequence specific TF according to literature or domain structure – No motif	
PURG	ENSG00000172733	Unknown	Likely sequence specific TF according to literature or domain structure – No motif	
RAG1	ENSG00000166349	Unknown	Likely sequence specific TF according to literature or domain structure – No motif	
RARA	ENSG00000131759	Nuclear receptor	Known motif – High-throughput in vitro	RRGGTCANV
RARB	ENSG00000077092	Nuclear receptor	Known motif – High-throughput in vitro	TGACCYYTTGACCYY
RARG	ENSG00000172819	Nuclear receptor	Known motif – High-throughput in vitro	VGGTCA
RAX	ENSG00000134438	Homeodomain	Known motif – High-throughput in vitro	HTAATTR
RAX2	ENSG00000173976	Homeodomain	Known motif – High-throughput in vitro	TAATTR
RBAK	ENSG00000146587	C2H2 ZF	Known motif – High-throughput in vitro	VGDRASRARVRRSV
RBCK1	ENSG00000125826	Unknown	Likely sequence specific TF according to literature or domain structure – No motif	
RBPJ	ENSG00000168214	CSL	Known motif – High-throughput in vitro	BTCHCA
RBPJL	ENSG00000124232	CSL	Inferred motif from similar protein – In vivo/Misc source	DTTCCCABR
RBSN	ENSG00000131381	C2H2 ZF	Likely sequence specific TF according to literature or domain structure – No motif	
REL	ENSG00000162924	Rel	Known motif – In vivo/Misc source	GGAAWNYCCV
RELA	ENSG00000173039	Rel	Known motif – In vivo/Misc source	BKGGAAAKYCCCH
RELB	ENSG00000104856	Rel	Known motif – In vivo/Misc source	DKSAAAKYCCCB
REPIN1	ENSG00000214022	C2H2 ZF	Likely sequence specific TF according to literature or domain structure – No motif	
REST	ENSG00000084093	C2H2 ZF	Known motif – In vivo/Misc source	DTCAGSACCWYGGACAGCDSC
REXO4	ENSG00000148300	Unknown	Likely sequence specific TF according to literature or domain structure – No motif	
RFX1	ENSG00000132005	RFX	Known motif – High-throughput in vitro	BGTTRYCATGRYAACV
RFX2	ENSG00000087903	RFX	Known motif – High-throughput in vitro	BGTTRCCATGGYAACV
RFX3	ENSG00000080298	RFX	Known motif – High-throughput in vitro	BGTTDCCATGGYAAC
RFX4	ENSG00000111783	RFX	Known motif – High-throughput in vitro	GTWRYCATRGHWAC
RFX5	ENSG00000143390	RFX	Known motif – High-throughput in vitro	BGTTGCYATGGYAACV
RFX6	ENSG00000185002	RFX	Inferred motif from similar protein – High-throughput in vitro	GTHDYYNNS
RFX7	ENSG00000181827	RFX	Known motif – High-throughput in vitro	BGTTRCYRY
RFX8	ENSG00000196460	RFX	Likely sequence specific TF according to literature or domain structure – No motif	
RHOXF1	ENSG00000101883	Homeodomain	Known motif – High-throughput in vitro	TRAKCCH
RHOXF2	ENSG00000131721	Homeodomain	Known motif – High-throughput in vitro	TAATCC
RHOXF2B	ENSG00000203989	Homeodomain	Inferred motif from similar protein – High-throughput in vitro	TAATCC
RLF	ENSG00000117000	C2H2 ZF	Likely sequence specific TF according to literature or domain structure – No motif	
RORA	ENSG00000069667	Nuclear receptor	Known motif – High-throughput in vitro	MRAGGTCAAVYYVAGGTCA
RORB	ENSG00000198963	Nuclear receptor	Known motif – High-throughput in vitro	AWNBRGGTCA
RORC	ENSG00000143365	Nuclear receptor	Known motif – High-throughput in vitro	TGMCCYANWTH
RREB1	ENSG00000124782	C2H2 ZF	Known motif – In vivo/Misc source	MCMCMAMMCAMCMMCHMMSV
RUNX1	ENSG00000159216	Runt	Known motif – In vivo/Misc source	VACCACAV
RUNX2	ENSG00000124813	Runt	Known motif – High-throughput in vitro	HRACCRCADWAACCRCAV
RUNX3	ENSG00000020633	Runt	Known motif – High-throughput in vitro	WAACCRCAR
RXRA	ENSG00000186350	Nuclear receptor	Known motif – High-throughput in vitro	RRGGTCAAAGGTCA
RXRB	ENSG00000204231	Nuclear receptor	Known motif – High-throughput in vitro	RRGGTCAAAGGTCA
RXRG	ENSG00000143171	Nuclear receptor	Known motif – High-throughput in vitro	RRGGTCAAAGGTCA
SAFB	ENSG00000160633	Unknown	Likely sequence specific TF according to literature or domain structure – No motif	
SAFB2	ENSG00000130254	Unknown	Likely sequence specific TF according to literature or domain structure – No motif	
SALL1	ENSG00000103449	C2H2 ZF	Inferred motif from similar protein – In vivo/Misc source	RYYCAAAAB
SALL2	ENSG00000165821	C2H2 ZF	Known motif – In vivo/Misc source	CCCACCC
SALL3	ENSG00000256463	C2H2 ZF	Likely sequence specific TF according to literature or domain structure – No motif	
SALL4	ENSG00000101115	C2H2 ZF	Inferred motif from similar protein – In vivo/Misc source	GCTGATAACAGV
SATB1	ENSG00000182568	CUT; Homeodomain	Known motif – In vivo/Misc source	WKWWWTAAHGRYMNWW
SATB2	ENSG00000119042	CUT; Homeodomain	Inferred motif from similar protein – In vivo/Misc source	WKWWWTAAHGRYMNWW
SCMH1	ENSG00000010803	Unknown	Likely sequence specific TF according to literature or domain structure – No motif	
SCML4	ENSG00000146285	AT hook	Likely sequence specific TF according to literature or domain structure – No motif	
SCRT1	ENSG00000261678	C2H2 ZF	Known motif – High-throughput in vitro	KCAACAGGTD
SCRT2	ENSG00000215397	C2H2 ZF	Known motif – High-throughput in vitro	RHGCAACAGGTGB
SCX	ENSG00000260428	bHLH	Inferred motif from similar protein – High-throughput in vitro	VCRKMYGB
SEBOX	ENSG00000274529	Homeodomain	Inferred motif from similar protein – High-throughput in vitro	HTTAATTA
SETBP1	ENSG00000152217	AT hook	Likely sequence specific TF according to literature or domain structure – No motif	
SETDB1	ENSG00000143379	MBD	Known motif – In vivo/Misc source	RACTHCMDYTCCCRKVRDGCHNYG
SETDB2	ENSG00000136169	MBD	Likely sequence specific TF according to literature or domain structure – No motif	
SGSM2	ENSG00000141258	BED ZF	Likely sequence specific TF according to literature or domain structure – No motif	
SHOX	ENSG00000185960	Homeodomain	Known motif – High-throughput in vitro	TAATTR
SHOX2	ENSG00000168779	Homeodomain	Known motif – High-throughput in vitro	BTAATTR
SIM1	ENSG00000112246	bHLH	Inferred motif from similar protein – In vivo/Misc source	VVNGCACGTMBNS
SIM2	ENSG00000159263	bHLH	Inferred motif from similar protein – In vivo/Misc source	VVNGCACGTMBNS
SIX1	ENSG00000126778	Homeodomain	Known motif – High-throughput in vitro	VBGTATCR
SIX2	ENSG00000170577	Homeodomain	Known motif – High-throughput in vitro	VSGTATCR
SIX3	ENSG00000138083	Homeodomain	Known motif – High-throughput in vitro	VVTATCR
SIX4	ENSG00000100625	Homeodomain	Known motif – High-throughput in vitro	VBGTATCRB
SIX5	ENSG00000177045	Homeodomain	Known motif – In vivo/Misc source	GGAGTTGT
SIX6	ENSG00000184302	Homeodomain	Known motif – High-throughput in vitro	VBSTATCR
SKI	ENSG00000157933	Unknown	Likely sequence specific TF according to literature or domain structure – No motif	
SKIL	ENSG00000136603	Unknown	Likely sequence specific TF according to literature or domain structure – No motif	
SKOR1	ENSG00000188779	Unknown	Known motif – High-throughput in vitro	WNVKGTAATTAMB
SKOR2	ENSG00000215474	SAND	Known motif – High-throughput in vitro	WNVKGTAATTAA
SLC2A4RG	ENSG00000125520	C2H2 ZF	Likely sequence specific TF according to literature or domain structure – No motif	
SMAD1	ENSG00000170365	SMAD	Known motif – In vivo/Misc source	DRCAGASAGGSH
SMAD3	ENSG00000166949	SMAD	Known motif – High-throughput in vitro	YGTCTAGACA
SMAD4	ENSG00000141646	SMAD	Known motif – from protein with 100% identical DBD – in vitro	KCYAGACR
SMAD5	ENSG00000113658	SMAD	Known motif – High-throughput in vitro	YGTCTAGACW
SMAD9	ENSG00000120693	SMAD	Known motif – In vivo/Misc source	WGGTCTAGMCMT
SMYD3	ENSG00000185420	Unknown	Likely sequence specific TF according to literature or domain structure – No motif	
SNAI1	ENSG00000124216	C2H2 ZF	Known motif – High-throughput in vitro	VCACCTGY
SNAI2	ENSG00000019549	C2H2 ZF	Known motif – High-throughput in vitro	RRCAGGTGYR
SNAI3	ENSG00000185669	C2H2 ZF	Known motif – High-throughput in vitro	DRCAGGTGYR
SNAPC2	ENSG00000104976	Unknown	Likely sequence specific TF according to literature or domain structure – No motif	
SNAPC4	ENSG00000165684	Myb/SANT	Likely sequence specific TF according to literature or domain structure – No motif	
SNAPC5	ENSG00000174446	Unknown	Likely sequence specific TF according to literature or domain structure – No motif	
SOHLH1	ENSG00000165643	bHLH	Likely sequence specific TF according to literature or domain structure – No motif	
SOHLH2	ENSG00000120669	bHLH	Known motif – High-throughput in vitro	BCACGTGC
SON	ENSG00000159140	Unknown	Likely sequence specific TF according to literature or domain structure – No motif	
SOX1	ENSG00000182968	HMG/Sox	Known motif – from protein with 100% identical DBD – in vitro	WBAAW
SOX10	ENSG00000100146	HMG/Sox	Known motif – High-throughput in vitro	DAACAWWGVV
SOX11	ENSG00000176887	HMG/Sox	Known motif – from protein with 100% identical DBD – in vitro	VACAAW
SOX12	ENSG00000177732	HMG/Sox	Known motif – High-throughput in vitro	MCCGAACAAT
SOX13	ENSG00000143842	HMG/Sox	Known motif – from protein with 100% identical DBD – in vitro	RAACAATW
SOX14	ENSG00000168875	HMG/Sox	Known motif – High-throughput in vitro	WCAATR
SOX15	ENSG00000129194	HMG/Sox	Known motif – High-throughput in vitro	ATCAATAMCATTGAT
SOX17	ENSG00000164736	HMG/Sox	Known motif – High-throughput in vitro	DRACAATRV
SOX18	ENSG00000203883	HMG/Sox	Known motif – High-throughput in vitro	ATCAATGHWATTGAT
SOX2	ENSG00000181449	HMG/Sox	Known motif – High-throughput in vitro	HATCAATANCATTGATH
SOX21	ENSG00000125285	HMG/Sox	Known motif – High-throughput in vitro	TCAMTRHCATTGA
SOX3	ENSG00000134595	HMG/Sox	Known motif – High-throughput in vitro	SBNAMAATRB
SOX30	ENSG00000039600	HMG/Sox	Known motif – High-throughput in vitro	RACAAT
SOX4	ENSG00000124766	HMG/Sox	Known motif – High-throughput in vitro	AACAAWGR
SOX5	ENSG00000134532	HMG/Sox	Known motif – High-throughput in vitro	DVACAATRV
SOX6	ENSG00000110693	HMG/Sox	Known motif – High-throughput in vitro	DRACAATRV
SOX7	ENSG00000171056	HMG/Sox	Known motif – High-throughput in vitro	DAACAATKDYAKTGTT
SOX8	ENSG00000005513	HMG/Sox	Known motif – High-throughput in vitro	HATCAATTKCAGTGAT
SOX9	ENSG00000125398	HMG/Sox	Known motif – High-throughput in vitro	DDACAATRV
SP1	ENSG00000185591	C2H2 ZF	Known motif – High-throughput in vitro	RCCMCDCCCMH
SP100	ENSG00000067066	SAND	Likely sequence specific TF according to literature or domain structure – No motif	
SP110	ENSG00000135899	SAND	Likely sequence specific TF according to literature or domain structure – No motif	
SP140	ENSG00000079263	SAND	Likely sequence specific TF according to literature or domain structure – No motif	
SP140L	ENSG00000185404	SAND	Likely sequence specific TF according to literature or domain structure – No motif	
SP2	ENSG00000167182	C2H2 ZF	Known motif – High-throughput in vitro	YWAGYCCCGCCCMCYH
SP3	ENSG00000172845	C2H2 ZF	Known motif – High-throughput in vitro	VCCMCRCCCMY
SP4	ENSG00000105866	C2H2 ZF	Known motif – High-throughput in vitro	WRGCCACGCCCMCHY
SP5	ENSG00000204335	C2H2 ZF	Known motif – In vivo/Misc source	ACCVCGCCKCCSS
SP6	ENSG00000189120	C2H2 ZF	Inferred motif from similar protein – High-throughput in vitro	HNGCCACGCCCARK
SP7	ENSG00000170374	C2H2 ZF	Known motif – In vivo/Misc source	VBNSGGGGNGG
SP8	ENSG00000164651	C2H2 ZF	Known motif – High-throughput in vitro	VMCACBCCCMCH
SP9	ENSG00000217236	C2H2 ZF	Known motif – High-throughput in vitro	VMCMCGCCCMYH
SPDEF	ENSG00000124664	Ets	Known motif – High-throughput in vitro	AMCCGGATRTD
SPEN	ENSG00000065526	Unknown	Likely sequence specific TF according to literature or domain structure – No motif	
SPI1	ENSG00000066336	Ets	Known motif – High-throughput in vitro	RAAAAGMGGAAGTW
SPIB	ENSG00000269404	Ets	Known motif – High-throughput in vitro	WWWRVGGAAST
SPIC	ENSG00000166211	Ets	Known motif – High-throughput in vitro	RAAWSVGGAAGTM
SPZ1	ENSG00000164299	Unknown	Known motif – In vivo/Misc source	GGSDGWWMCVBHBG
SRCAP	ENSG00000080603	AT hook	Likely sequence specific TF according to literature or domain structure – No motif	
SREBF1	ENSG00000072310	bHLH	Known motif – High-throughput in vitro	VHCACVCSAY
SREBF2	ENSG00000198911	bHLH	Known motif – High-throughput in vitro	RTCACGTGAY
SRF	ENSG00000112658	MADS box	Known motif – High-throughput in vitro	DCCWTATATGGT
SRY	ENSG00000184895	HMG/Sox	Known motif – High-throughput in vitro	AACAATGNTATTGTT
ST18	ENSG00000147488	C2H2 ZF	Inferred motif from similar protein – High-throughput in vitro	VAAGTTT
STAT1	ENSG00000115415	STAT	Known motif – In vivo/Misc source	HTTCCYRGAAR
STAT2	ENSG00000170581	STAT	Known motif – In vivo/Misc source	TNRGTTTCDNTTYC
STAT3	ENSG00000168610	STAT	Known motif – In vivo/Misc source	HTTCCYRKMA
STAT4	ENSG00000138378	STAT	Known motif – In vivo/Misc source	BDHTTCTBGKAAD
STAT5A	ENSG00000126561	STAT	Known motif – In vivo/Misc source	YTTCYNRGAAHY
STAT5B	ENSG00000173757	STAT	Known motif – In vivo/Misc source	ADTTCYHRGAAA
STAT6	ENSG00000166888	STAT	Known motif – In vivo/Misc source	DWTTYCNDDGAA
T	ENSG00000164458	T-box	Known motif – High-throughput in vitro	ANGTGYGAHWWNTVRCACCT
TAL1	ENSG00000162367	bHLH	Known motif – In vivo/Misc source	RNCAGVTGGH
TAL2	ENSG00000186051	bHLH	Inferred motif from similar protein – In vivo/Misc source	RNCAGVTGGH
TBP	ENSG00000112592	TBP	Known motif – from protein with 100% identical DBD – in vitro	WWWWAW
TBPL1	ENSG00000028839	TBP	Likely sequence specific TF according to literature or domain structure – No motif	
TBPL2	ENSG00000182521	TBP	Inferred motif from similar protein – High-throughput in vitro	WWWWAW
TBR1	ENSG00000136535	T-box	Known motif – High-throughput in vitro	TTCACACCT
TBX1	ENSG00000184058	T-box	Known motif – High-throughput in vitro	TCACACCT
TBX10	ENSG00000167800	T-box	Inferred motif from similar protein – High-throughput in vitro	BYTCACACCYHV
TBX15	ENSG00000092607	T-box	Known motif – High-throughput in vitro	TCACACCT
TBX18	ENSG00000112837	T-box	Known motif – High-throughput in vitro	BYTCACACCTHH
TBX19	ENSG00000143178	T-box	Known motif – High-throughput in vitro	TMRCACNTABGTGYBAH
TBX2	ENSG00000121068	T-box	Known motif – High-throughput in vitro	VRCRC
TBX20	ENSG00000164532	T-box	Known motif – High-throughput in vitro	TCACRCBYTMACACCT
TBX21	ENSG00000073861	T-box	Known motif – High-throughput in vitro	WTCACACCTH
TBX22	ENSG00000122145	T-box	Known motif – In vivo/Misc source	AGGTGWSAAWTTCACACCT
TBX3	ENSG00000135111	T-box	Known motif – High-throughput in vitro	YVACACSH
TBX4	ENSG00000121075	T-box	Known motif – High-throughput in vitro	TVACACCT
TBX5	ENSG00000089225	T-box	Known motif – High-throughput in vitro	TVACACCT
TBX6	ENSG00000149922	T-box	Known motif – High-throughput in vitro	TVACACSY
TCF12	ENSG00000140262	bHLH	Known motif – High-throughput in vitro	VCACSTGB
TCF15	ENSG00000125878	bHLH	Inferred motif from similar protein – High-throughput in vitro	VCRKMYGB
TCF20	ENSG00000100207	Unknown	Likely sequence specific TF according to literature or domain structure – No motif	
TCF21	ENSG00000118526	bHLH	Known motif – High-throughput in vitro	RVCAGCTGTTV
TCF23	ENSG00000163792	bHLH	Inferred motif from similar protein – High-throughput in vitro	VCRKMYGB
TCF24	ENSG00000261787	bHLH	Inferred motif from similar protein – High-throughput in vitro	RMCAKMTGK
TCF3	ENSG00000071564	bHLH	Known motif – High-throughput in vitro	VCAGGTGB
TCF4	ENSG00000196628	bHLH	Known motif – High-throughput in vitro	HRCACCTGB
TCF7	ENSG00000081059	HMG/Sox	Known motif – High-throughput in vitro	DSATCAAWS
TCF7L1	ENSG00000152284	HMG/Sox	Known motif – High-throughput in vitro	AAAGATCAAAGG
TCF7L2	ENSG00000148737	HMG/Sox	Known motif – from protein with 100% identical DBD – in vitro	SWTCAAAV
TCFL5	ENSG00000101190	bHLH	Known motif – High-throughput in vitro	KCRCGCGCHC
TEAD1	ENSG00000187079	TEA	Known motif – High-throughput in vitro	RCATTCCDH
TEAD2	ENSG00000074219	TEA	Known motif – High-throughput in vitro	YRCATTCCW
TEAD3	ENSG00000007866	TEA	Known motif – High-throughput in vitro	RCATTCYDNDCATWCCD
TEAD4	ENSG00000197905	TEA	Known motif – High-throughput in vitro	RMATTCYD
TEF	ENSG00000167074	bZIP	Known motif – High-throughput in vitro	VTTACRTAAB
TERB1	ENSG00000249961	Myb/SANT	Likely sequence specific TF according to literature or domain structure – No motif	
TERF1	ENSG00000147601	Myb/SANT	Likely sequence specific TF according to literature or domain structure – No motif	
TERF2	ENSG00000132604	Myb/SANT	Inferred motif from similar protein – High-throughput in vitro	AACCCTAV
TET1	ENSG00000138336	CxxC	Known motif – High-throughput in vitro	HVCGH
TET2	ENSG00000168769	Unknown	Likely sequence specific TF according to literature or domain structure – No motif	
TET3	ENSG00000187605	CxxC	Likely sequence specific TF according to literature or domain structure – No motif	
TFAP2A	ENSG00000137203	AP-2	Known motif – High-throughput in vitro	HSCCYBVRGGCD
TFAP2B	ENSG00000008196	AP-2	Known motif – High-throughput in vitro	SCCBNVGGS
TFAP2C	ENSG00000087510	AP-2	Known motif – High-throughput in vitro	HGCCYBVRGGSD
TFAP2D	ENSG00000008197	AP-2	Known motif – In vivo/Misc source	RCGNGCCBCRGVCB
TFAP2E	ENSG00000116819	AP-2	Known motif – High-throughput in vitro	HSCCYSRGGSD
TFAP4	ENSG00000090447	bHLH	Known motif – High-throughput in vitro	VWCAGCTGWB
TFCP2	ENSG00000135457	Grainyhead	Known motif – High-throughput in vitro	WCCGGWWHDAWCYGGW
TFCP2L1	ENSG00000115112	Grainyhead	Known motif – High-throughput in vitro	DCYRGHNNNDDCYRGH
TFDP1	ENSG00000198176	E2F	Known motif – In vivo/Misc source	DYYTCSCGCYMWWY
TFDP2	ENSG00000114126	E2F	Inferred motif from similar protein – In vivo/Misc source	DYYTCSCGCYMWWY
TFDP3	ENSG00000183434	E2F	Inferred motif from similar protein – In vivo/Misc source	DYYTCSCGCYMWWY
TFE3	ENSG00000068323	bHLH	Known motif – High-throughput in vitro	RKCACGTGNB
TFEB	ENSG00000112561	bHLH	Known motif – High-throughput in vitro	RNCACGTGAY
TFEC	ENSG00000105967	bHLH	Known motif – High-throughput in vitro	RNCACRTGAB
TGIF1	ENSG00000177426	Homeodomain	Known motif – High-throughput in vitro	TGACAGCTGTCA
TGIF2	ENSG00000118707	Homeodomain	Known motif – High-throughput in vitro	TGACABVTGTCA
TGIF2LX	ENSG00000153779	Homeodomain	Known motif – High-throughput in vitro	TGACASSTGTCA
TGIF2LY	ENSG00000176679	Homeodomain	Known motif – High-throughput in vitro	TGACABVTGTCA
THAP1	ENSG00000131931	THAP finger	Known motif – In vivo/Misc source	BYYGCCMKNANYMAAVATGGCSV
THAP10	ENSG00000129028	THAP finger	Likely sequence specific TF according to literature or domain structure – No motif	
THAP11	ENSG00000168286	THAP finger	Likely sequence specific TF according to literature or domain structure – No motif	
THAP12	ENSG00000137492	THAP finger	Known motif – High-throughput in vitro	YMBNNBGR
THAP2	ENSG00000173451	THAP finger	Likely sequence specific TF according to literature or domain structure – No motif	
THAP3	ENSG00000041988	THAP finger	Likely sequence specific TF according to literature or domain structure – No motif	
THAP4	ENSG00000176946	THAP finger	Likely sequence specific TF according to literature or domain structure – No motif	
THAP5	ENSG00000177683	THAP finger	Likely sequence specific TF according to literature or domain structure – No motif	
THAP6	ENSG00000174796	THAP finger	Likely sequence specific TF according to literature or domain structure – No motif	
THAP7	ENSG00000184436	THAP finger	Likely sequence specific TF according to literature or domain structure – No motif	
THAP8	ENSG00000161277	THAP finger	Likely sequence specific TF according to literature or domain structure – No motif	
THAP9	ENSG00000168152	THAP finger	Likely sequence specific TF according to literature or domain structure – No motif	
THRA	ENSG00000126351	Nuclear receptor	Known motif – High-throughput in vitro	DTGACCTBATRAGGTCAH
THRB	ENSG00000151090	Nuclear receptor	Known motif – High-throughput in vitro	TGWCCTBRNYVAGGWCA
THYN1	ENSG00000151500	Unknown	Likely sequence specific TF according to literature or domain structure – No motif	
TIGD1	ENSG00000221944	CENPB	Known motif – High-throughput in vitro	SCGCAATA
TIGD2	ENSG00000180346	CENPB	Inferred motif from similar protein – High-throughput in vitro	RCGGWWR
TIGD3	ENSG00000173825	CENPB	Likely sequence specific TF according to literature or domain structure – No motif	
TIGD4	ENSG00000169989	CENPB	Likely sequence specific TF according to literature or domain structure – No motif	
TIGD5	ENSG00000179886	CENPB	Likely sequence specific TF according to literature or domain structure – No motif	
TIGD6	ENSG00000164296	CENPB	Inferred motif from similar protein – High-throughput in vitro	WVCRWA
TIGD7	ENSG00000140993	CENPB	Likely sequence specific TF according to literature or domain structure – No motif	
TLX1	ENSG00000107807	Homeodomain	Known motif – In vivo/Misc source	VCHHVTTRVCV
TLX2	ENSG00000115297	Homeodomain	Known motif – High-throughput in vitro	BTAATTR
TLX3	ENSG00000164438	Homeodomain	Known motif – High-throughput in vitro	AATKGNNNNNNNNNNNNNCAATT
TMF1	ENSG00000144747	Unknown	Likely sequence specific TF according to literature or domain structure – No motif	
TOPORS	ENSG00000197579	Unknown	Known motif – In vivo/Misc source	TCCCAGCTACTTTGGGA
TP53	ENSG00000141510	p53	Known motif – In vivo/Misc source	DRCATGYYBRGRCATGYCY
TP63	ENSG00000073282	p53	Known motif – High-throughput in vitro	DACATGTYVYRACATGTY
TP73	ENSG00000078900	p53	Known motif – In vivo/Misc source	DRRCAWGYHCWGRCWTGYH
TPRX1	ENSG00000178928	Homeodomain	Likely sequence specific TF according to literature or domain structure – No motif	
TRAFD1	ENSG00000135148	C2H2 ZF	Likely sequence specific TF according to literature or domain structure – No motif	
TRERF1	ENSG00000124496	C2H2 ZF; Myb/SANT	Inferred motif from similar protein – In vivo/Misc source	AGACKTTAGTCA
TRPS1	ENSG00000104447	GATA	Known motif – In vivo/Misc source	HWSRARATAGWDDMH
TSC22D1	ENSG00000102804	Unknown	Likely sequence specific TF according to literature or domain structure – No motif	
TSHZ1	ENSG00000179981	C2H2 ZF	Likely sequence specific TF according to literature or domain structure – No motif	
TSHZ2	ENSG00000182463	C2H2 ZF	Likely sequence specific TF according to literature or domain structure – No motif	
TSHZ3	ENSG00000121297	C2H2 ZF	Likely sequence specific TF according to literature or domain structure – No motif	
TTF1	ENSG00000125482	Myb/SANT	Likely sequence specific TF according to literature or domain structure – No motif	
TWIST1	ENSG00000122691	bHLH	Known motif – In vivo/Misc source	MHVCACHTGSD
TWIST2	ENSG00000233608	bHLH	Known motif – from protein with 100% identical DBD – in vitro	MCATATGT
UBP1	ENSG00000153560	Grainyhead	Known motif – High-throughput in vitro	DCYRGHNNNNDCYRGH
UNCX	ENSG00000164853	Homeodomain	Known motif – High-throughput in vitro	TAATTR
USF1	ENSG00000158773	bHLH	Known motif – High-throughput in vitro	RNCACGTGRY
USF2	ENSG00000105698	bHLH	Known motif – High-throughput in vitro	VCACGTGVC
USF3	ENSG00000176542	bHLH	Likely sequence specific TF according to literature or domain structure – No motif	
VAX1	ENSG00000148704	Homeodomain	Known motif – High-throughput in vitro	YTAATKA
VAX2	ENSG00000116035	Homeodomain	Known motif – High-throughput in vitro	YTAATKA
VDR	ENSG00000111424	Nuclear receptor	Known motif – High-throughput in vitro	TGAACYCDRTGAACYC
VENTX	ENSG00000151650	Homeodomain	Known motif – High-throughput in vitro	VNTAATBR
VEZF1	ENSG00000136451	C2H2 ZF	Known motif – High-throughput in vitro	RKGGGGGG
VSX1	ENSG00000100987	Homeodomain	Known motif – High-throughput in vitro	TAATTRS
VSX2	ENSG00000119614	Homeodomain	Known motif – High-throughput in vitro	YTAATTA
WIZ	ENSG00000011451	C2H2 ZF	Likely sequence specific TF according to literature or domain structure – No motif	
WT1	ENSG00000184937	C2H2 ZF	Known motif – High-throughput in vitro	BGGGGGRG
XBP1	ENSG00000100219	bZIP	Known motif – High-throughput in vitro	GVTGACGTGKCVHW
XPA	ENSG00000136936	Unknown	Known motif – High-throughput in vitro	VCACCTCACMY
YBX1	ENSG00000065978	CSD	Known motif – High-throughput in vitro	YGTWCCAYC
YBX2	ENSG00000006047	CSD	Inferred motif from similar protein – High-throughput in vitro	YGTWCCAYC
YBX3	ENSG00000060138	CSD	Known motif – from protein with 100% identical DBD – in vitro	YGTWCCAYC
YY1	ENSG00000100811	C2H2 ZF	Known motif – High-throughput in vitro	HRWNATGGCB
YY2	ENSG00000230797	C2H2 ZF	Known motif – High-throughput in vitro	DDNATGGCGG
ZBED1	ENSG00000214717	BED ZF	Known motif – High-throughput in vitro	YATGTCGCGAYAD
ZBED2	ENSG00000177494	BED ZF	Likely sequence specific TF according to literature or domain structure – No motif	
ZBED3	ENSG00000132846	BED ZF	Likely sequence specific TF according to literature or domain structure – No motif	
ZBED4	ENSG00000100426	BED ZF	Likely sequence specific TF according to literature or domain structure – No motif	
ZBED5	ENSG00000236287	BED ZF	Likely sequence specific TF according to literature or domain structure – No motif	
ZBED6	ENSG00000257315	BED ZF	Inferred motif from similar protein – In vivo/Misc source	VVRGCGAGCYYV
ZBED9	ENSG00000232040	BED ZF	Likely sequence specific TF according to literature or domain structure – No motif	
ZBTB1	ENSG00000126804	C2H2 ZF	Known motif – from protein with 100% identical DBD – in vitro	HMMCGCRH
ZBTB10	ENSG00000205189	C2H2 ZF	Likely sequence specific TF according to literature or domain structure – No motif	
ZBTB11	ENSG00000066422	C2H2 ZF	Known motif – In vivo/Misc source	GGGGKGCRCMCA
ZBTB12	ENSG00000204366	C2H2 ZF	Known motif – High-throughput in vitro	CTAGAACMB
ZBTB14	ENSG00000198081	C2H2 ZF	Known motif – High-throughput in vitro	VDCGTGCACGCGCRH
ZBTB16	ENSG00000109906	C2H2 ZF	Known motif – In vivo/Misc source	BTVNWYBKVHKBTAAADYWKKRHYWRDKY
ZBTB17	ENSG00000116809	C2H2 ZF	Likely sequence specific TF according to literature or domain structure – No motif	
ZBTB18	ENSG00000179456	C2H2 ZF	Known motif – High-throughput in vitro	DKCCAGATGTK
ZBTB2	ENSG00000181472	C2H2 ZF	Known motif – High-throughput in vitro	DKWACCGGRA
ZBTB20	ENSG00000181722	C2H2 ZF	Known motif – High-throughput in vitro	VYATACRTYV
ZBTB21	ENSG00000173276	C2H2 ZF	Likely sequence specific TF according to literature or domain structure – No motif	
ZBTB22	ENSG00000236104	C2H2 ZF	Known motif – High-throughput in vitro	HKCACWAYNRTWGTGMD
ZBTB24	ENSG00000112365	C2H2 ZF; AT hook	Likely sequence specific TF according to literature or domain structure – No motif	
ZBTB25	ENSG00000089775	C2H2 ZF	Likely sequence specific TF according to literature or domain structure – No motif	
ZBTB26	ENSG00000171448	C2H2 ZF	Known motif – High-throughput in vitro	DHTCYAGAAHR
ZBTB3	ENSG00000185670	C2H2 ZF	Known motif – from protein with 100% identical DBD – in vitro	DSCAGYK
ZBTB32	ENSG00000011590	C2H2 ZF	Known motif – High-throughput in vitro	HGTACAGTRWYACTGTACD
ZBTB33	ENSG00000177485	C2H2 ZF	Known motif – In vivo/Misc source	SVNTCTCGCGAGANB
ZBTB34	ENSG00000177125	C2H2 ZF	Inferred motif from similar protein – High-throughput in vitro	DTCGGCYAABDCGGCA
ZBTB37	ENSG00000185278	C2H2 ZF	Known motif – High-throughput in vitro	DTCGGCYAABDCGGCA
ZBTB38	ENSG00000177311	C2H2 ZF	Likely sequence specific TF according to literature or domain structure – No motif	
ZBTB39	ENSG00000166860	C2H2 ZF	Likely sequence specific TF according to literature or domain structure – No motif	
ZBTB4	ENSG00000174282	C2H2 ZF	Known motif – In vivo/Misc source	CVCHAHCRCYMTBG
ZBTB40	ENSG00000184677	C2H2 ZF	Likely sequence specific TF according to literature or domain structure – No motif	
ZBTB41	ENSG00000177888	C2H2 ZF	Likely sequence specific TF according to literature or domain structure – No motif	
ZBTB42	ENSG00000179627	C2H2 ZF	Known motif – High-throughput in vitro	MRCAKCTGS
ZBTB43	ENSG00000169155	C2H2 ZF	Known motif – High-throughput in vitro	GTGCTRNNNNNDDGGCAC
ZBTB44	ENSG00000196323	C2H2 ZF	Known motif – High-throughput in vitro	RMTGCAKB
ZBTB45	ENSG00000119574	C2H2 ZF	Known motif – High-throughput in vitro	BMTATAGGBR
ZBTB46	ENSG00000130584	C2H2 ZF	Likely sequence specific TF according to literature or domain structure – No motif	
ZBTB47	ENSG00000114853	C2H2 ZF	Likely sequence specific TF according to literature or domain structure – No motif	
ZBTB48	ENSG00000204859	C2H2 ZF	Known motif – In vivo/Misc source	YHAGGGANHDD
ZBTB49	ENSG00000168826	C2H2 ZF	Known motif – High-throughput in vitro	TGACVBGYCARGCRRAA
ZBTB5	ENSG00000168795	C2H2 ZF	Likely sequence specific TF according to literature or domain structure – No motif	
ZBTB6	ENSG00000186130	C2H2 ZF	Known motif – In vivo/Misc source	VGRTGMTRGAGCC
ZBTB7A	ENSG00000178951	C2H2 ZF	Known motif – High-throughput in vitro	RCGACCACCNV
ZBTB7B	ENSG00000160685	C2H2 ZF	Known motif – High-throughput in vitro	DCGACCMCCVA
ZBTB7C	ENSG00000184828	C2H2 ZF	Known motif – High-throughput in vitro	DCRACCACCVH
ZBTB8A	ENSG00000160062	C2H2 ZF	Likely sequence specific TF according to literature or domain structure – No motif	
ZBTB8B	ENSG00000273274	C2H2 ZF	Likely sequence specific TF according to literature or domain structure – No motif	
ZBTB9	ENSG00000213588	C2H2 ZF	Likely sequence specific TF according to literature or domain structure – No motif	
ZC3H8	ENSG00000144161	CCCH ZF	Likely sequence specific TF according to literature or domain structure – No motif	
ZEB1	ENSG00000148516	C2H2 ZF; Homeodomain	Known motif – In vivo/Misc source	CAGGTGNR
ZEB2	ENSG00000169554	C2H2 ZF; Homeodomain	Inferred motif from similar protein – In vivo/Misc source	CAGGTGNR
ZFAT	ENSG00000066827	C2H2 ZF	Likely sequence specific TF according to literature or domain structure – No motif	
ZFHX2	ENSG00000136367	Homeodomain	Known motif – High-throughput in vitro	TRATYA
ZFHX3	ENSG00000140836	C2H2 ZF; Homeodomain	Known motif – High-throughput in vitro	RMTND
ZFHX4	ENSG00000091656	C2H2 ZF; Homeodomain	Inferred motif from similar protein – In vivo/Misc source	WAATWAWTAAY
ZFP1	ENSG00000184517	C2H2 ZF	Known motif – High-throughput in vitro	TDYBATACCCANHH
ZFP14	ENSG00000142065	C2H2 ZF	Known motif – High-throughput in vitro	GGAGSHHHHDGARHK
ZFP2	ENSG00000198939	C2H2 ZF	Inferred motif from similar protein – In vivo/Misc source	RGRAAVYGAAACT
ZFP28	ENSG00000196867	C2H2 ZF	Known motif – High-throughput in vitro	AYMNHWRARGAAAHDGARMKVHHDNDNNDNNH
ZFP3	ENSG00000180787	C2H2 ZF	Known motif – High-throughput in vitro	GGNTGNRTAGGAGYTYDB
ZFP30	ENSG00000120784	C2H2 ZF	Inferred motif from similar protein – High-throughput in vitro	RAHRNRGYTRNRDRNRG
ZFP37	ENSG00000136866	C2H2 ZF	Likely sequence specific TF according to literature or domain structure – No motif	
ZFP41	ENSG00000181638	C2H2 ZF	Known motif – High-throughput in vitro	RYGGAGAGTTAGC
ZFP42	ENSG00000179059	C2H2 ZF	Known motif – High-throughput in vitro	CAAKATGGCBGHC
ZFP57	ENSG00000204644	C2H2 ZF	Known motif – In vivo/Misc source	SNNVNNVBTGCCGCV
ZFP62	ENSG00000196670	C2H2 ZF	Likely sequence specific TF according to literature or domain structure – No motif	
ZFP64	ENSG00000020256	C2H2 ZF	Known motif – In vivo/Misc source	VGGRSCCCGGGVVNS
ZFP69	ENSG00000187815	C2H2 ZF	Known motif – High-throughput in vitro	GWGRCTRGAWAC
ZFP69B	ENSG00000187801	C2H2 ZF	Known motif – High-throughput in vitro	GTGGCTGGARVV
ZFP82	ENSG00000181007	C2H2 ZF	Known motif – High-throughput in vitro	AGAATTAGTRAAYTGGAARAY
ZFP90	ENSG00000184939	C2H2 ZF	Known motif – High-throughput in vitro	RYACTGCTTTWG
ZFP91	ENSG00000186660	C2H2 ZF	Likely sequence specific TF according to literature or domain structure – No motif	
ZFP92	ENSG00000189420	C2H2 ZF	Known motif – In vivo/Misc source	MGATAAAAKGM
ZFPM1	ENSG00000179588	C2H2 ZF	Likely sequence specific TF according to literature or domain structure – No motif	
ZFPM2	ENSG00000169946	C2H2 ZF	Likely sequence specific TF according to literature or domain structure – No motif	
ZFX	ENSG00000005889	C2H2 ZF	Known motif – In vivo/Misc source	VVSVSBNBBAGGCCBVGSH
ZFY	ENSG00000067646	C2H2 ZF	Inferred motif from similar protein – In vivo/Misc source	BAGGCCBVGSYBVV
ZGLP1	ENSG00000220201	GATA	Likely sequence specific TF according to literature or domain structure – No motif	
ZGPAT	ENSG00000197114	CCCH ZF	Likely sequence specific TF according to literature or domain structure – No motif	
ZHX1	ENSG00000165156	Homeodomain	Known motif – High-throughput in vitro	DYB
ZHX2	ENSG00000178764	Homeodomain	Likely sequence specific TF according to literature or domain structure – No motif	
ZHX3	ENSG00000174306	Homeodomain	Likely sequence specific TF according to literature or domain structure – No motif	
ZIC1	ENSG00000152977	C2H2 ZF	Known motif – High-throughput in vitro	DCRCAGCRGGGGGBV
ZIC2	ENSG00000043355	C2H2 ZF	Known motif – from protein with 100% identical DBD – in vitro	YNRBRKG
ZIC3	ENSG00000156925	C2H2 ZF	Known motif – High-throughput in vitro	KCACAGCRGGGGGTCB
ZIC4	ENSG00000174963	C2H2 ZF	Known motif – High-throughput in vitro	DCNCHRCRGGGGGYM
ZIC5	ENSG00000139800	C2H2 ZF	Known motif – High-throughput in vitro	DCDCAGCGGGGGGTM
ZIK1	ENSG00000171649	C2H2 ZF	Known motif – High-throughput in vitro	RDRRCAAWRGCAMNRVRWNNB
ZIM2	ENSG00000269699	C2H2 ZF	Known motif – In vivo/Misc source	YCNBSYBSCYTYYYCHBCCVGCCYGKGGYY
ZIM3	ENSG00000141946	C2H2 ZF	Known motif – High-throughput in vitro	RNHAACAGAAANCYM
ZKSCAN1	ENSG00000106261	C2H2 ZF	Known motif – High-throughput in vitro	CCTACTAHGH
ZKSCAN2	ENSG00000155592	C2H2 ZF	Known motif – High-throughput in vitro	RRRRRMMAC
ZKSCAN3	ENSG00000189298	C2H2 ZF	Known motif – High-throughput in vitro	TCGAGGYTAGMCCA
ZKSCAN4	ENSG00000187626	C2H2 ZF	Likely sequence specific TF according to literature or domain structure – No motif	
ZKSCAN5	ENSG00000196652	C2H2 ZF	Known motif – High-throughput in vitro	DGGAGGTGA
ZKSCAN7	ENSG00000196345	C2H2 ZF	Known motif – High-throughput in vitro	VYAHACTKTNRAGYGV
ZKSCAN8	ENSG00000198315	C2H2 ZF	Likely sequence specific TF according to literature or domain structure – No motif	
ZMAT1	ENSG00000166432	C2H2 ZF	Likely sequence specific TF according to literature or domain structure – No motif	
ZMAT4	ENSG00000165061	C2H2 ZF	Likely sequence specific TF according to literature or domain structure – No motif	
ZNF10	ENSG00000256223	C2H2 ZF	Known motif – High-throughput in vitro	TGAGGT
ZNF100	ENSG00000197020	C2H2 ZF	Known motif – High-throughput in vitro	VBRNGGCGGCGGCNB
ZNF101	ENSG00000181896	C2H2 ZF	Known motif – High-throughput in vitro	VDGYKGCCCCHGTRTCH
ZNF107	ENSG00000196247	C2H2 ZF	Likely sequence specific TF according to literature or domain structure – No motif	
ZNF112	ENSG00000062370	C2H2 ZF	Likely sequence specific TF according to literature or domain structure – No motif	
ZNF114	ENSG00000178150	C2H2 ZF	Known motif – In vivo/Misc source	VSSSBSBVVSSBSSSSYHTWTATABVSB
ZNF117	ENSG00000152926	C2H2 ZF	Inferred motif from similar protein – In vivo/Misc source	GKGCWGCAGM
ZNF12	ENSG00000164631	C2H2 ZF	Known motif – High-throughput in vitro	VYGCKRTAACAARYAKSMCC
ZNF121	ENSG00000197961	C2H2 ZF	Known motif – High-throughput in vitro	VCDGGVCMRVDBWGYVNGRYCCH
ZNF124	ENSG00000196418	C2H2 ZF	Known motif – High-throughput in vitro	AAGAAGGCTTTAATYRGG
ZNF131	ENSG00000172262	C2H2 ZF	Likely sequence specific TF according to literature or domain structure – No motif	
ZNF132	ENSG00000131849	C2H2 ZF	Known motif – High-throughput in vitro	VRGGARRGNRGGARG
ZNF133	ENSG00000125846	C2H2 ZF	Known motif – High-throughput in vitro	DGRNMCAAMWNANGTAHAAKTGGHDNH
ZNF134	ENSG00000213762	C2H2 ZF	Known motif – High-throughput in vitro	VYTMAKCAGKKGMNG
ZNF135	ENSG00000176293	C2H2 ZF	Known motif – High-throughput in vitro	HHYTGAGGTYGAGCY
ZNF136	ENSG00000196646	C2H2 ZF	Known motif – High-throughput in vitro	TTCTTGGTTGRCAGKTTT
ZNF138	ENSG00000197008	C2H2 ZF	Likely sequence specific TF according to literature or domain structure – No motif	
ZNF14	ENSG00000105708	C2H2 ZF	Likely sequence specific TF according to literature or domain structure – No motif	
ZNF140	ENSG00000196387	C2H2 ZF	Known motif – High-throughput in vitro	GAGCGGAATTGYH
ZNF141	ENSG00000131127	C2H2 ZF	Known motif – High-throughput in vitro	RVKGRGRGYGKCCCCC
ZNF142	ENSG00000115568	C2H2 ZF	Likely sequence specific TF according to literature or domain structure – No motif	
ZNF143	ENSG00000166478	C2H2 ZF	Known motif – High-throughput in vitro	YWCCCAYAATGCAYYG
ZNF146	ENSG00000167635	C2H2 ZF	Known motif – High-throughput in vitro	GGARTAYTABDCAGC
ZNF148	ENSG00000163848	C2H2 ZF	Known motif – In vivo/Misc source	DGKGGGRGGD
ZNF154	ENSG00000179909	C2H2 ZF	Known motif – High-throughput in vitro	TGTCTAGTARRTCYD
ZNF155	ENSG00000204920	C2H2 ZF	Likely sequence specific TF according to literature or domain structure – No motif	
ZNF157	ENSG00000147117	C2H2 ZF	Known motif – High-throughput in vitro	KNNDNGYRYAYTGHWDNCCYYVCCADGHCH
ZNF16	ENSG00000170631	C2H2 ZF	Known motif – High-throughput in vitro	GAGCCAYDGMRGGYKBTD
ZNF160	ENSG00000170949	C2H2 ZF	Likely sequence specific TF according to literature or domain structure – No motif	
ZNF165	ENSG00000197279	C2H2 ZF	Likely sequence specific TF according to literature or domain structure – No motif	
ZNF169	ENSG00000175787	C2H2 ZF	Known motif – High-throughput in vitro	CTCCCT
ZNF17	ENSG00000186272	C2H2 ZF	Known motif – High-throughput in vitro	VNBNNNNNSTKYMTGYTCHKGNNNV
ZNF174	ENSG00000103343	C2H2 ZF	Known motif – High-throughput in vitro	GSCRAGTGAYYGNC
ZNF175	ENSG00000105497	C2H2 ZF	Known motif – In vivo/Misc source	CYAYACAHRAYAADGAATACA
ZNF177	ENSG00000188629	C2H2 ZF	Known motif – High-throughput in vitro	BTYGRTCKMRNKKNNVAGTCATD
ZNF18	ENSG00000154957	C2H2 ZF	Known motif – High-throughput in vitro	SNRTTCACACY
ZNF180	ENSG00000167384	C2H2 ZF	Known motif – High-throughput in vitro	VGGGVSNGGNGGSGRSBGSGGCVV
ZNF181	ENSG00000197841	C2H2 ZF	Known motif – High-throughput in vitro	VYYYSWGSTWSTNGGRMKGMKGHB
ZNF182	ENSG00000147118	C2H2 ZF	Known motif – High-throughput in vitro	AAAAMMAAAARMAAA
ZNF184	ENSG00000096654	C2H2 ZF	Known motif – High-throughput in vitro	TGGWGARGA
ZNF189	ENSG00000136870	C2H2 ZF	Known motif – High-throughput in vitro	VDGGAASRGMVDNDS
ZNF19	ENSG00000157429	C2H2 ZF	Known motif – High-throughput in vitro	DRGGVBHHDGACRNNDV
ZNF195	ENSG00000005801	C2H2 ZF	Likely sequence specific TF according to literature or domain structure – No motif	
ZNF197	ENSG00000186448	C2H2 ZF	Known motif – High-throughput in vitro	RRRGWCARRRRVVVR
ZNF2	ENSG00000275111	C2H2 ZF	Known motif – High-throughput in vitro	SCVCVGVGCYGCGC
ZNF20	ENSG00000132010	C2H2 ZF	Likely sequence specific TF according to literature or domain structure – No motif	
ZNF200	ENSG00000010539	C2H2 ZF	Known motif – High-throughput in vitro	BVNVSCGGAAGY
ZNF202	ENSG00000166261	C2H2 ZF	Known motif – In vivo/Misc source	CSCNBCYYCCDCYBCYBSBBCSBSBSCYB
ZNF205	ENSG00000122386	C2H2 ZF	Known motif – In vivo/Misc source	TGGAAT
ZNF207	ENSG00000010244	C2H2 ZF	Likely sequence specific TF according to literature or domain structure – No motif	
ZNF208	ENSG00000160321	C2H2 ZF	Likely sequence specific TF according to literature or domain structure – No motif	
ZNF211	ENSG00000121417	C2H2 ZF	Known motif – High-throughput in vitro	HNYATATACCAB
ZNF212	ENSG00000170260	C2H2 ZF	Known motif – In vivo/Misc source	CACACAHVHMCACRC
ZNF213	ENSG00000085644	C2H2 ZF	Known motif – High-throughput in vitro	MGAMMBCRGGCGGMG
ZNF214	ENSG00000149050	C2H2 ZF	Known motif – High-throughput in vitro	VWTMATYAANRTCCTCAAVAABD
ZNF215	ENSG00000149054	C2H2 ZF	Likely sequence specific TF according to literature or domain structure – No motif	
ZNF217	ENSG00000171940	C2H2 ZF	Known motif – In vivo/Misc source	GKNRGAAT
ZNF219	ENSG00000165804	C2H2 ZF	Known motif – In vivo/Misc source	DGGGGGGYGGW
ZNF22	ENSG00000165512	C2H2 ZF	Known motif – High-throughput in vitro	AAAAAAAAA
ZNF221	ENSG00000159905	C2H2 ZF	Likely sequence specific TF according to literature or domain structure – No motif	
ZNF222	ENSG00000159885	C2H2 ZF	Known motif – High-throughput in vitro	GCTGMSAYB
ZNF223	ENSG00000178386	C2H2 ZF	Known motif – In vivo/Misc source	MCACACASASM
ZNF224	ENSG00000267680	C2H2 ZF	Known motif – High-throughput in vitro	WMCYYNKGDGYHMHRKGRMTY
ZNF225	ENSG00000256294	C2H2 ZF	Known motif – In vivo/Misc source	TTAYCWKYDKNRYTTYTTTYTTTTTYYH
ZNF226	ENSG00000167380	C2H2 ZF	Likely sequence specific TF according to literature or domain structure – No motif	
ZNF227	ENSG00000131115	C2H2 ZF	Likely sequence specific TF according to literature or domain structure – No motif	
ZNF229	ENSG00000278318	C2H2 ZF	Likely sequence specific TF according to literature or domain structure – No motif	
ZNF23	ENSG00000167377	C2H2 ZF	Known motif – High-throughput in vitro	DCRMCCATGGCCGCGHCM
ZNF230	ENSG00000159882	C2H2 ZF	Likely sequence specific TF according to literature or domain structure – No motif	
ZNF232	ENSG00000167840	C2H2 ZF	Known motif – High-throughput in vitro	RTGTTAAAYGTRGATTAAS
ZNF233	ENSG00000159915	C2H2 ZF	Likely sequence specific TF according to literature or domain structure – No motif	
ZNF234	ENSG00000263002	C2H2 ZF	Likely sequence specific TF according to literature or domain structure – No motif	
ZNF235	ENSG00000159917	C2H2 ZF	Known motif – High-throughput in vitro	AARARADRAARRAAAWNRDDWDVDNNAWDR
ZNF236	ENSG00000130856	C2H2 ZF	Known motif – In vivo/Misc source	MGTAATATTVM
ZNF239	ENSG00000196793	C2H2 ZF	Likely sequence specific TF according to literature or domain structure – No motif	
ZNF24	ENSG00000172466	C2H2 ZF	Likely sequence specific TF according to literature or domain structure – No motif	
ZNF248	ENSG00000198105	C2H2 ZF	Known motif – High-throughput in vitro	RHDDACHATRTYCAKBRA
ZNF25	ENSG00000175395	C2H2 ZF	Known motif – In vivo/Misc source	WGAADWANAVARGTYGCWGCATTTAGAAA
ZNF250	ENSG00000196150	C2H2 ZF	Known motif – High-throughput in vitro	YASGCCYAY
ZNF251	ENSG00000198169	C2H2 ZF	Likely sequence specific TF according to literature or domain structure – No motif	
ZNF253	ENSG00000256771	C2H2 ZF	Likely sequence specific TF according to literature or domain structure – No motif	
ZNF254	ENSG00000213096	C2H2 ZF	Known motif – High-throughput in vitro	ACTGGCYTAGCCTCCCAGCCTACATCTTTCTCC
ZNF256	ENSG00000152454	C2H2 ZF	Likely sequence specific TF according to literature or domain structure – No motif	
ZNF257	ENSG00000197134	C2H2 ZF	Known motif – High-throughput in vitro	GAGGMRA
ZNF26	ENSG00000198393	C2H2 ZF	Known motif – In vivo/Misc source	ATTTTT
ZNF260	ENSG00000254004	C2H2 ZF	Known motif – High-throughput in vitro	GGARDRVDANRVDRV
ZNF263	ENSG00000006194	C2H2 ZF	Known motif – High-throughput in vitro	GGGAGSACB
ZNF264	ENSG00000083844	C2H2 ZF	Known motif – High-throughput in vitro	KKGRGSCCYYHNBRATGGGATTAGTGCCCT
ZNF266	ENSG00000174652	C2H2 ZF	Known motif – High-throughput in vitro	VNHRCTCACAGSYCC
ZNF267	ENSG00000185947	C2H2 ZF	Known motif – High-throughput in vitro	VSYNVVGGCNKGBGVRGVDG
ZNF268	ENSG00000090612	C2H2 ZF	Likely sequence specific TF according to literature or domain structure – No motif	
ZNF273	ENSG00000198039	C2H2 ZF	Known motif – High-throughput in vitro	GARAGGAGCTAC
ZNF274	ENSG00000171606	C2H2 ZF	Known motif – High-throughput in vitro	VYGAGRACTCAYRY
ZNF275	ENSG00000063587	C2H2 ZF	Likely sequence specific TF according to literature or domain structure – No motif	
ZNF276	ENSG00000158805	C2H2 ZF	Known motif – High-throughput in vitro	WAAGGWSGWVDMKACNHCCTTWA
ZNF277	ENSG00000198839	C2H2 ZF; BED ZF	Likely sequence specific TF according to literature or domain structure – No motif	
ZNF28	ENSG00000198538	C2H2 ZF	Known motif – High-throughput in vitro	GBNKSHGGGGTGCCM
ZNF280A	ENSG00000169548	C2H2 ZF	Known motif – In vivo/Misc source	TCTCWCCWGTRTGRRTTCTYTSAT
ZNF280B	ENSG00000275004	C2H2 ZF	Likely sequence specific TF according to literature or domain structure – No motif	
ZNF280C	ENSG00000056277	C2H2 ZF	Likely sequence specific TF according to literature or domain structure – No motif	
ZNF280D	ENSG00000137871	C2H2 ZF	Likely sequence specific TF according to literature or domain structure – No motif	
ZNF281	ENSG00000162702	C2H2 ZF	Known motif – High-throughput in vitro	KGGGGGAGGGGS
ZNF282	ENSG00000170265	C2H2 ZF	Known motif – High-throughput in vitro	HTCCCMYNACMCK
ZNF283	ENSG00000167637	C2H2 ZF	Known motif – High-throughput in vitro	BNGGCTGRTSBKGSYBGGSYB
ZNF284	ENSG00000186026	C2H2 ZF	Known motif – High-throughput in vitro	GCTGGAGTGCAG
ZNF285	ENSG00000267508	C2H2 ZF	Known motif – In vivo/Misc source	TNTTYTYBYTYDYTYTNHTTT
ZNF286A	ENSG00000187607	C2H2 ZF	Likely sequence specific TF according to literature or domain structure – No motif	
ZNF286B	ENSG00000249459	C2H2 ZF	Likely sequence specific TF according to literature or domain structure – No motif	
ZNF287	ENSG00000141040	C2H2 ZF	Known motif – High-throughput in vitro	AAAARAAAARRWARMARAVMWRRARRAVADR
ZNF292	ENSG00000188994	C2H2 ZF	Likely sequence specific TF according to literature or domain structure – No motif	
ZNF296	ENSG00000170684	C2H2 ZF	Known motif – High-throughput in vitro	VVTGWCCASYV
ZNF3	ENSG00000166526	C2H2 ZF	Known motif – High-throughput in vitro	TGAHTGAMTRANWGA
ZNF30	ENSG00000168661	C2H2 ZF	Known motif – High-throughput in vitro	CGGACGGGGCGGCTG
ZNF300	ENSG00000145908	C2H2 ZF	Known motif – In vivo/Misc source	KKDGWRDDDGNRKBNDDGDDKKNRNBKRKR
ZNF302	ENSG00000089335	C2H2 ZF	Known motif – High-throughput in vitro	AGTTGAGTGACTGYDSTT
ZNF304	ENSG00000131845	C2H2 ZF	Known motif – High-throughput in vitro	VVGRSYVGRBYGGGGMVGGNV
ZNF311	ENSG00000197935	C2H2 ZF	Known motif – In vivo/Misc source	YYSCDGCBSBNBCYS
ZNF316	ENSG00000205903	C2H2 ZF	Known motif – In vivo/Misc source	KCCSCCGGACCH
ZNF317	ENSG00000130803	C2H2 ZF	Known motif – High-throughput in vitro	RACAGMWGACWD
ZNF318	ENSG00000171467	C2H2 ZF	Likely sequence specific TF according to literature or domain structure – No motif	
ZNF319	ENSG00000166188	C2H2 ZF	Likely sequence specific TF according to literature or domain structure – No motif	
ZNF32	ENSG00000169740	C2H2 ZF	Known motif – High-throughput in vitro	BGTAAYNYGAYACB
ZNF320	ENSG00000182986	C2H2 ZF	Known motif – High-throughput in vitro	CMYHKKCCCCYKGVHCCCMC
ZNF322	ENSG00000181315	C2H2 ZF	Known motif – High-throughput in vitro	VVGGCHSHGKASCAGDCHS
ZNF324	ENSG00000083812	C2H2 ZF	Known motif – High-throughput in vitro	GRTYRAACCATCCY
ZNF324B	ENSG00000249471	C2H2 ZF	Known motif – In vivo/Misc source	HHHDGSMRGSHRAGG
ZNF326	ENSG00000162664	C2H2 ZF	Likely sequence specific TF according to literature or domain structure – No motif	
ZNF329	ENSG00000181894	C2H2 ZF	Known motif – High-throughput in vitro	CYKGAKCMVVCYNNDCCTGMA
ZNF331	ENSG00000130844	C2H2 ZF	Known motif – High-throughput in vitro	VVAVSSNNMYWGCWGAGCMCWKYCH
ZNF333	ENSG00000160961	C2H2 ZF	Known motif – High-throughput in vitro	STGGAKSM
ZNF334	ENSG00000198185	C2H2 ZF	Known motif – In vivo/Misc source	YCCGKSMGGGAGGTGRGG
ZNF335	ENSG00000198026	C2H2 ZF	Likely sequence specific TF according to literature or domain structure – No motif	
ZNF337	ENSG00000130684	C2H2 ZF	Known motif – High-throughput in vitro	AGTRGTGAYRAATTC
ZNF33A	ENSG00000189180	C2H2 ZF	Known motif – High-throughput in vitro	TCAGTGCAC
ZNF33B	ENSG00000196693	C2H2 ZF	Known motif – High-throughput in vitro	ATTMAATHCCHTYYNHTDVMW
ZNF34	ENSG00000196378	C2H2 ZF	Known motif – In vivo/Misc source	DRARGAVAAGYCTGD
ZNF341	ENSG00000131061	C2H2 ZF	Known motif – In vivo/Misc source	VVVRRVRRNDVVNGGARSAGC
ZNF343	ENSG00000088876	C2H2 ZF	Known motif – High-throughput in vitro	KRCCGHGGKGAAGCGB
ZNF345	ENSG00000251247	C2H2 ZF	Known motif – High-throughput in vitro	TTGCAACVYVNRCAACYGKAC
ZNF346	ENSG00000113761	C2H2 ZF	Likely sequence specific TF according to literature or domain structure – No motif	
ZNF347	ENSG00000197937	C2H2 ZF	Likely sequence specific TF according to literature or domain structure – No motif	
ZNF35	ENSG00000169981	C2H2 ZF	Known motif – High-throughput in vitro	ATATRTAAAGAGYTYYTABAA
ZNF350	ENSG00000256683	C2H2 ZF	Known motif – High-throughput in vitro	DNBDVRKHAWAAAARRRCH
ZNF354A	ENSG00000169131	C2H2 ZF	Known motif – High-throughput in vitro	RTAAATGGHYTAAAY
ZNF354B	ENSG00000178338	C2H2 ZF	Known motif – High-throughput in vitro	AAKGRRMTAWHY
ZNF354C	ENSG00000177932	C2H2 ZF	Known motif – In vivo/Misc source	VTCCAC
ZNF358	ENSG00000198816	C2H2 ZF	Likely sequence specific TF according to literature or domain structure – No motif	
ZNF362	ENSG00000160094	C2H2 ZF	Likely sequence specific TF according to literature or domain structure – No motif	
ZNF365	ENSG00000138311	C2H2 ZF	Likely sequence specific TF according to literature or domain structure – No motif	
ZNF366	ENSG00000178175	C2H2 ZF	Likely sequence specific TF according to literature or domain structure – No motif	
ZNF367	ENSG00000165244	C2H2 ZF	Likely sequence specific TF according to literature or domain structure – No motif	
ZNF37A	ENSG00000075407	C2H2 ZF	Known motif – High-throughput in vitro	GGARRRRRV
ZNF382	ENSG00000161298	C2H2 ZF	Known motif – High-throughput in vitro	GWGVMANYASTACAGRYMHHRBDS
ZNF383	ENSG00000188283	C2H2 ZF	Known motif – High-throughput in vitro	GAGSVRVRASRKGGMAGGRRBCNGGGY
ZNF384	ENSG00000126746	C2H2 ZF	Known motif – High-throughput in vitro	TTTTBNNNNNNNNNNNNVAAAA
ZNF385A	ENSG00000161642	C2H2 ZF	Likely sequence specific TF according to literature or domain structure – No motif	
ZNF385B	ENSG00000144331	C2H2 ZF	Likely sequence specific TF according to literature or domain structure – No motif	
ZNF385C	ENSG00000187595	C2H2 ZF	Likely sequence specific TF according to literature or domain structure – No motif	
ZNF385D	ENSG00000151789	C2H2 ZF	Known motif – High-throughput in vitro	HHGTCGCGACRD
ZNF391	ENSG00000124613	C2H2 ZF	Likely sequence specific TF according to literature or domain structure – No motif	
ZNF394	ENSG00000160908	C2H2 ZF	Known motif – In vivo/Misc source	VVRGGAGNAGCWGNRVVDNV
ZNF395	ENSG00000186918	C2H2 ZF	Likely sequence specific TF according to literature or domain structure – No motif	
ZNF396	ENSG00000186496	C2H2 ZF	Known motif – High-throughput in vitro	VTTTCGKACAB
ZNF397	ENSG00000186812	C2H2 ZF	Likely sequence specific TF according to literature or domain structure – No motif	
ZNF398	ENSG00000197024	C2H2 ZF	Known motif – In vivo/Misc source	DGGGARRGARRSAG
ZNF404	ENSG00000176222	C2H2 ZF	Likely sequence specific TF according to literature or domain structure – No motif	
ZNF407	ENSG00000215421	C2H2 ZF	Likely sequence specific TF according to literature or domain structure – No motif	
ZNF408	ENSG00000175213	C2H2 ZF	Likely sequence specific TF according to literature or domain structure – No motif	
ZNF41	ENSG00000147124	C2H2 ZF	Known motif – High-throughput in vitro	RMARGGRARNNNRRSACMATGAGNVAV
ZNF410	ENSG00000119725	C2H2 ZF	Known motif – High-throughput in vitro	MCATCCCATAATANBM
ZNF414	ENSG00000133250	C2H2 ZF	Likely sequence specific TF according to literature or domain structure – No motif	
ZNF415	ENSG00000170954	C2H2 ZF	Known motif – In vivo/Misc source	VTRCVCVMTKARBATC
ZNF416	ENSG00000083817	C2H2 ZF	Known motif – In vivo/Misc source	TRGCCCAGTCAAGTTGAC
ZNF417	ENSG00000173480	C2H2 ZF	Known motif – High-throughput in vitro	HNGGCGCCAVNTG
ZNF418	ENSG00000196724	C2H2 ZF	Known motif – High-throughput in vitro	VDGWRGCYAAAAGCA
ZNF419	ENSG00000105136	C2H2 ZF	Known motif – High-throughput in vitro	DGGARAGKMHAGGRCTGBADW
ZNF420	ENSG00000197050	C2H2 ZF	Likely sequence specific TF according to literature or domain structure – No motif	
ZNF423	ENSG00000102935	C2H2 ZF	Known motif – In vivo/Misc source	GRCACCCWAGGGTGC
ZNF425	ENSG00000204947	C2H2 ZF	Known motif – In vivo/Misc source	GGBACA
ZNF426	ENSG00000130818	C2H2 ZF	Likely sequence specific TF according to literature or domain structure – No motif	
ZNF428	ENSG00000131116	C2H2 ZF	Likely sequence specific TF according to literature or domain structure – No motif	
ZNF429	ENSG00000197013	C2H2 ZF	Known motif – High-throughput in vitro	DGGMRKAGSHVNMAATGGGYH
ZNF43	ENSG00000198521	C2H2 ZF	Likely sequence specific TF according to literature or domain structure – No motif	
ZNF430	ENSG00000118620	C2H2 ZF	Known motif – High-throughput in vitro	MCADGGHRGMNDGCHR
ZNF431	ENSG00000196705	C2H2 ZF	Known motif – In vivo/Misc source	VRGGCTRGMWGNYNV
ZNF432	ENSG00000256087	C2H2 ZF	Known motif – In vivo/Misc source	GTYRAAAACAAT
ZNF433	ENSG00000197647	C2H2 ZF	Known motif – High-throughput in vitro	RDGACYRHWGTRRTAAYY
ZNF436	ENSG00000125945	C2H2 ZF	Known motif – High-throughput in vitro	TCCTCCAGGAAGCCY
ZNF438	ENSG00000183621	C2H2 ZF	Likely sequence specific TF according to literature or domain structure – No motif	
ZNF439	ENSG00000171291	C2H2 ZF	Known motif – In vivo/Misc source	CARTCACCYYCHGGV
ZNF44	ENSG00000197857	C2H2 ZF	Known motif – High-throughput in vitro	VBGNTVYKGCHGYDVNG
ZNF440	ENSG00000171295	C2H2 ZF	Known motif – High-throughput in vitro	RRTKGTTCTGCW
ZNF441	ENSG00000197044	C2H2 ZF	Known motif – High-throughput in vitro	SRGRCGGAGYB
ZNF442	ENSG00000198342	C2H2 ZF	Known motif – In vivo/Misc source	SHWDWTWTTTNHHTTTTT
ZNF443	ENSG00000180855	C2H2 ZF	Known motif – High-throughput in vitro	GYCTBCYMAGWHGCKGGBRTT
ZNF444	ENSG00000167685	C2H2 ZF	Known motif – High-throughput in vitro	DGGGGGAGGGGGAYG
ZNF445	ENSG00000185219	C2H2 ZF	Known motif – In vivo/Misc source	AAMTYCYYGASNRNMMAGGRKTMYYYCHC
ZNF446	ENSG00000083838	C2H2 ZF	Likely sequence specific TF according to literature or domain structure – No motif	
ZNF449	ENSG00000173275	C2H2 ZF	Known motif – High-throughput in vitro	RCGCCCAACC
ZNF45	ENSG00000124459	C2H2 ZF	Known motif – High-throughput in vitro	AGGAANAYA
ZNF451	ENSG00000112200	C2H2 ZF	Likely sequence specific TF according to literature or domain structure – No motif	
ZNF454	ENSG00000178187	C2H2 ZF	Known motif – High-throughput in vitro	WRGCGCCWGGCGCYW
ZNF460	ENSG00000197714	C2H2 ZF	Known motif – High-throughput in vitro	CAACGCCCCCCG
ZNF461	ENSG00000197808	C2H2 ZF	Likely sequence specific TF according to literature or domain structure – No motif	
ZNF462	ENSG00000148143	C2H2 ZF	Likely sequence specific TF according to literature or domain structure – No motif	
ZNF467	ENSG00000181444	C2H2 ZF	Known motif – High-throughput in vitro	GGDGGGGGAGGG
ZNF468	ENSG00000204604	C2H2 ZF	Known motif – High-throughput in vitro	DGGGAGGGGGYGSNS
ZNF469	ENSG00000225614	C2H2 ZF	Likely sequence specific TF according to literature or domain structure – No motif	
ZNF470	ENSG00000197016	C2H2 ZF	Likely sequence specific TF according to literature or domain structure – No motif	
ZNF471	ENSG00000196263	C2H2 ZF	Likely sequence specific TF according to literature or domain structure – No motif	
ZNF473	ENSG00000142528	C2H2 ZF	Likely sequence specific TF according to literature or domain structure – No motif	
ZNF474	ENSG00000164185	C2H2 ZF	Likely sequence specific TF according to literature or domain structure – No motif	
ZNF479	ENSG00000185177	C2H2 ZF	Known motif – High-throughput in vitro	GADGACYYKGRGGRY
ZNF48	ENSG00000180035	C2H2 ZF	Likely sequence specific TF according to literature or domain structure – No motif	
ZNF480	ENSG00000198464	C2H2 ZF	Known motif – High-throughput in vitro	DRDGAAKGDGDD
ZNF483	ENSG00000173258	C2H2 ZF	Known motif – High-throughput in vitro	DSAGRGAGCTGCA
ZNF484	ENSG00000127081	C2H2 ZF	Known motif – High-throughput in vitro	VRDGGAVWGVRGMASWDGVNV
ZNF485	ENSG00000198298	C2H2 ZF	Known motif – High-throughput in vitro	AYTTSSWWTKKSRMYRTRKGS
ZNF486	ENSG00000256229	C2H2 ZF	Known motif – In vivo/Misc source	VVBBBNSNGCSGAMDCCCGGV
ZNF487	ENSG00000243660	C2H2 ZF	Known motif – In vivo/Misc source	VVBBBNSNGCSGAMDCCCGGV
ZNF488	ENSG00000265763	C2H2 ZF	Likely sequence specific TF according to literature or domain structure – No motif	
ZNF490	ENSG00000188033	C2H2 ZF	Known motif – In vivo/Misc source	HDGNMRGCAGCANAY
ZNF491	ENSG00000177599	C2H2 ZF	Likely sequence specific TF according to literature or domain structure – No motif	
ZNF492	ENSG00000229676	C2H2 ZF	Known motif – High-throughput in vitro	MNAARARMAMBAAAARGG
ZNF493	ENSG00000196268	C2H2 ZF	Likely sequence specific TF according to literature or domain structure – No motif	
ZNF496	ENSG00000162714	C2H2 ZF	Known motif – In vivo/Misc source	BCNSBCYCYBHMYYHSHBYCY
ZNF497	ENSG00000174586	C2H2 ZF	Likely sequence specific TF according to literature or domain structure – No motif	
ZNF500	ENSG00000103199	C2H2 ZF	Likely sequence specific TF according to literature or domain structure – No motif	
ZNF501	ENSG00000186446	C2H2 ZF	Known motif – High-throughput in vitro	GCGACGCGAMCV
ZNF502	ENSG00000196653	C2H2 ZF	Known motif – High-throughput in vitro	GGACYDBTGCAGTAGYHH
ZNF503	ENSG00000165655	C2H2 ZF	Likely sequence specific TF according to literature or domain structure – No motif	
ZNF506	ENSG00000081665	C2H2 ZF	Known motif – High-throughput in vitro	YTGGGGGCTCVBMC
ZNF507	ENSG00000168813	C2H2 ZF	Likely sequence specific TF according to literature or domain structure – No motif	
ZNF510	ENSG00000081386	C2H2 ZF	Likely sequence specific TF according to literature or domain structure – No motif	
ZNF511	ENSG00000198546	C2H2 ZF	Likely sequence specific TF according to literature or domain structure – No motif	
ZNF512	ENSG00000243943	C2H2 ZF; BED ZF	Likely sequence specific TF according to literature or domain structure – No motif	
ZNF512B	ENSG00000196700	C2H2 ZF	Likely sequence specific TF according to literature or domain structure – No motif	
ZNF513	ENSG00000163795	C2H2 ZF	Known motif – High-throughput in vitro	GATGRTGATGATGRT
ZNF514	ENSG00000144026	C2H2 ZF	Likely sequence specific TF according to literature or domain structure – No motif	
ZNF516	ENSG00000101493	C2H2 ZF	Likely sequence specific TF according to literature or domain structure – No motif	
ZNF517	ENSG00000197363	C2H2 ZF	Likely sequence specific TF according to literature or domain structure – No motif	
ZNF518A	ENSG00000177853	C2H2 ZF	Likely sequence specific TF according to literature or domain structure – No motif	
ZNF518B	ENSG00000178163	C2H2 ZF	Likely sequence specific TF according to literature or domain structure – No motif	
ZNF519	ENSG00000175322	C2H2 ZF	Known motif – High-throughput in vitro	GGGCGGCKGCRGCBGCGS
ZNF521	ENSG00000198795	C2H2 ZF	Known motif – In vivo/Misc source	TGGGGGMCCCCW
ZNF524	ENSG00000171443	C2H2 ZF; AT hook	Known motif – High-throughput in vitro	YTCGVACCC
ZNF525	ENSG00000203326	C2H2 ZF	Known motif – High-throughput in vitro	RTTMCTWATDMAGNT
ZNF526	ENSG00000167625	C2H2 ZF	Likely sequence specific TF according to literature or domain structure – No motif	
ZNF527	ENSG00000189164	C2H2 ZF	Known motif – In vivo/Misc source	DGRKNGBMDGHRACAGMRR
ZNF528	ENSG00000167555	C2H2 ZF	Known motif – High-throughput in vitro	GGAAGYCATTTC
ZNF529	ENSG00000186020	C2H2 ZF	Known motif – In vivo/Misc source	CYCYBYCTBCYHDSM
ZNF530	ENSG00000183647	C2H2 ZF	Known motif – High-throughput in vitro	GMADGGMNAGGGSCNGVV
ZNF532	ENSG00000074657	C2H2 ZF	Likely sequence specific TF according to literature or domain structure – No motif	
ZNF534	ENSG00000198633	C2H2 ZF	Known motif – High-throughput in vitro	GVGGGGMRAGARBNBVV
ZNF536	ENSG00000198597	C2H2 ZF	Likely sequence specific TF according to literature or domain structure – No motif	
ZNF540	ENSG00000171817	C2H2 ZF	Known motif – In vivo/Misc source	RGRGGVAGGVA
ZNF541	ENSG00000118156	C2H2 ZF; Myb/SANT	Known motif – In vivo/Misc source	CCCATGCGCGGG
ZNF543	ENSG00000178229	C2H2 ZF	Known motif – High-throughput in vitro	SSVCWGGVCMGS
ZNF544	ENSG00000198131	C2H2 ZF	Likely sequence specific TF according to literature or domain structure – No motif	
ZNF546	ENSG00000187187	C2H2 ZF	Likely sequence specific TF according to literature or domain structure – No motif	
ZNF547	ENSG00000152433	C2H2 ZF	Known motif – High-throughput in vitro	GCWAAYKCWGCARGC
ZNF548	ENSG00000188785	C2H2 ZF	Known motif – High-throughput in vitro	GBBGCKGCDGSVSSVSVG
ZNF549	ENSG00000121406	C2H2 ZF	Known motif – High-throughput in vitro	ATGAAYYGGGCAGCM
ZNF550	ENSG00000251369	C2H2 ZF	Known motif – High-throughput in vitro	DNVRRDGCWRRGGYAGRG
ZNF551	ENSG00000204519	C2H2 ZF	Likely sequence specific TF according to literature or domain structure – No motif	
ZNF552	ENSG00000178935	C2H2 ZF	Known motif – High-throughput in vitro	CCACGAGGGGH
ZNF554	ENSG00000172006	C2H2 ZF	Known motif – High-throughput in vitro	CHGRGYCANNYRGDKDRCH
ZNF555	ENSG00000186300	C2H2 ZF	Known motif – In vivo/Misc source	AAAAAGCCGCGGCGG
ZNF556	ENSG00000172000	C2H2 ZF	Likely sequence specific TF according to literature or domain structure – No motif	
ZNF557	ENSG00000130544	C2H2 ZF	Known motif – In vivo/Misc source	MAGARTGYT
ZNF558	ENSG00000167785	C2H2 ZF	Known motif – High-throughput in vitro	HKGRAYHTGTRGRTKBATRYCTTYCAK
ZNF559	ENSG00000188321	C2H2 ZF	Likely sequence specific TF according to literature or domain structure – No motif	
ZNF560	ENSG00000198028	C2H2 ZF	Likely sequence specific TF according to literature or domain structure – No motif	
ZNF561	ENSG00000171469	C2H2 ZF	Known motif – In vivo/Misc source	DSNGCMGAAARGSBBYBBBCC
ZNF562	ENSG00000171466	C2H2 ZF	Known motif – In vivo/Misc source	DDYYCAGCAAGGCAMWWT
ZNF563	ENSG00000188868	C2H2 ZF	Known motif – High-throughput in vitro	BTCMBNNSHRGCMRCHGY
ZNF564	ENSG00000249709	C2H2 ZF	Known motif – High-throughput in vitro	GGGAAGTCCAAG
ZNF565	ENSG00000196357	C2H2 ZF	Known motif – High-throughput in vitro	ATGYTGTGAGGAAGCYCA
ZNF566	ENSG00000186017	C2H2 ZF	Known motif – High-throughput in vitro	VNDGCKGVAARGGARSC
ZNF567	ENSG00000189042	C2H2 ZF	Known motif – High-throughput in vitro	VHAVAARHAGAMMHHNARRTG
ZNF568	ENSG00000198453	C2H2 ZF	Likely sequence specific TF according to literature or domain structure – No motif	
ZNF569	ENSG00000196437	C2H2 ZF	Likely sequence specific TF according to literature or domain structure – No motif	
ZNF57	ENSG00000171970	C2H2 ZF	Likely sequence specific TF according to literature or domain structure – No motif	
ZNF570	ENSG00000171827	C2H2 ZF	Known motif – High-throughput in vitro	ARAHAWMWHNMAAGAAAA
ZNF571	ENSG00000180479	C2H2 ZF	Known motif – High-throughput in vitro	SSGMGGCBGMGGCRG
ZNF572	ENSG00000180938	C2H2 ZF	Likely sequence specific TF according to literature or domain structure – No motif	
ZNF573	ENSG00000189144	C2H2 ZF	Known motif – High-throughput in vitro	MAGHMMDGGCMCAMNMADB
ZNF574	ENSG00000105732	C2H2 ZF	Known motif – High-throughput in vitro	CTAGAGMGKCSS
ZNF575	ENSG00000176472	C2H2 ZF	Likely sequence specific TF according to literature or domain structure – No motif	
ZNF576	ENSG00000124444	C2H2 ZF	Likely sequence specific TF according to literature or domain structure – No motif	
ZNF577	ENSG00000161551	C2H2 ZF	Likely sequence specific TF according to literature or domain structure – No motif	
ZNF578	ENSG00000258405	C2H2 ZF	Likely sequence specific TF according to literature or domain structure – No motif	
ZNF579	ENSG00000218891	C2H2 ZF	Likely sequence specific TF according to literature or domain structure – No motif	
ZNF580	ENSG00000213015	C2H2 ZF	Known motif – High-throughput in vitro	VCTACCNYHNNVCTACCNH
ZNF581	ENSG00000171425	C2H2 ZF	Known motif – In vivo/Misc source	CTTCTAVAAGV
ZNF582	ENSG00000018869	C2H2 ZF	Known motif – High-throughput in vitro	KYMSYTGCMGCCNARNGCAYBCYH
ZNF583	ENSG00000198440	C2H2 ZF	Likely sequence specific TF according to literature or domain structure – No motif	
ZNF584	ENSG00000171574	C2H2 ZF	Known motif – High-throughput in vitro	DNTTTMARAAHTGYTWTGGDH
ZNF585A	ENSG00000196967	C2H2 ZF	Known motif – High-throughput in vitro	TCYGTWYTY
ZNF585B	ENSG00000245680	C2H2 ZF	Likely sequence specific TF according to literature or domain structure – No motif	
ZNF586	ENSG00000083828	C2H2 ZF	Known motif – High-throughput in vitro	CAGGCCYRGAGG
ZNF587	ENSG00000198466	C2H2 ZF	Known motif – High-throughput in vitro	MCMRYGTTGGGCGCHANNHD
ZNF587B	ENSG00000269343	C2H2 ZF	Likely sequence specific TF according to literature or domain structure – No motif	
ZNF589	ENSG00000164048	C2H2 ZF	Known motif – In vivo/Misc source	VSRBDRWWVCCBYKK
ZNF592	ENSG00000166716	C2H2 ZF	Likely sequence specific TF according to literature or domain structure – No motif	
ZNF594	ENSG00000180626	C2H2 ZF	Known motif – High-throughput in vitro	RDDSDGAGAGCNSS
ZNF595	ENSG00000272602	C2H2 ZF	Known motif – High-throughput in vitro	GGGAGGGMWKC
ZNF596	ENSG00000172748	C2H2 ZF	Known motif – High-throughput in vitro	VGVRRGAGVSMGAGM
ZNF597	ENSG00000167981	C2H2 ZF	Known motif – High-throughput in vitro	CAARATGGCGKM
ZNF598	ENSG00000167962	C2H2 ZF	Likely sequence specific TF according to literature or domain structure – No motif	
ZNF599	ENSG00000153896	C2H2 ZF	Likely sequence specific TF according to literature or domain structure – No motif	
ZNF600	ENSG00000189190	C2H2 ZF	Likely sequence specific TF according to literature or domain structure – No motif	
ZNF605	ENSG00000196458	C2H2 ZF	Known motif – High-throughput in vitro	DGGKNNDDAGRVVCCMNRVD
ZNF606	ENSG00000166704	C2H2 ZF	Likely sequence specific TF according to literature or domain structure – No motif	
ZNF607	ENSG00000198182	C2H2 ZF	Likely sequence specific TF according to literature or domain structure – No motif	
ZNF608	ENSG00000168916	C2H2 ZF	Likely sequence specific TF according to literature or domain structure – No motif	
ZNF609	ENSG00000180357	C2H2 ZF	Likely sequence specific TF according to literature or domain structure – No motif	
ZNF610	ENSG00000167554	C2H2 ZF	Known motif – High-throughput in vitro	GGAGCGGC
ZNF611	ENSG00000213020	C2H2 ZF	Known motif – High-throughput in vitro	GGAGMGCCBVNGVVBVSCBSB
ZNF613	ENSG00000176024	C2H2 ZF	Known motif – High-throughput in vitro	WAAAAAAAB
ZNF614	ENSG00000142556	C2H2 ZF	Known motif – In vivo/Misc source	BDCTTKAKCTMATKD
ZNF615	ENSG00000197619	C2H2 ZF	Known motif – High-throughput in vitro	AAABDVCTGYBSCCC
ZNF616	ENSG00000204611	C2H2 ZF	Known motif – High-throughput in vitro	RHRGGTGAGCRY
ZNF618	ENSG00000157657	C2H2 ZF	Likely sequence specific TF according to literature or domain structure – No motif	
ZNF619	ENSG00000177873	C2H2 ZF	Known motif – In vivo/Misc source	BYNNBCCCCNNCCYCAGGAAT
ZNF620	ENSG00000177842	C2H2 ZF	Known motif – In vivo/Misc source	WKTSYAKTY
ZNF621	ENSG00000172888	C2H2 ZF	Known motif – In vivo/Misc source	RRRVKCYCAGGGMAG
ZNF623	ENSG00000183309	C2H2 ZF	Likely sequence specific TF according to literature or domain structure – No motif	
ZNF624	ENSG00000197566	C2H2 ZF	Likely sequence specific TF according to literature or domain structure – No motif	
ZNF625	ENSG00000257591	C2H2 ZF	Likely sequence specific TF according to literature or domain structure – No motif	
ZNF626	ENSG00000188171	C2H2 ZF	Known motif – High-throughput in vitro	HDVRTNNKGYTVHKVTGBYCCYTSYH
ZNF627	ENSG00000198551	C2H2 ZF	Known motif – High-throughput in vitro	TTTAAGCCCACTGTTGAG
ZNF628	ENSG00000197483	C2H2 ZF	Known motif – In vivo/Misc source	GCAACCAACCTTG
ZNF629	ENSG00000102870	C2H2 ZF	Likely sequence specific TF according to literature or domain structure – No motif	
ZNF630	ENSG00000221994	C2H2 ZF	Likely sequence specific TF according to literature or domain structure – No motif	
ZNF639	ENSG00000121864	C2H2 ZF	Likely sequence specific TF according to literature or domain structure – No motif	
ZNF641	ENSG00000167528	C2H2 ZF	Known motif – High-throughput in vitro	TGGGGGGGT
ZNF644	ENSG00000122482	C2H2 ZF	Likely sequence specific TF according to literature or domain structure – No motif	
ZNF645	ENSG00000175809	C2H2 ZF	Likely sequence specific TF according to literature or domain structure – No motif	
ZNF646	ENSG00000167395	C2H2 ZF	Likely sequence specific TF according to literature or domain structure – No motif	
ZNF648	ENSG00000179930	C2H2 ZF	Likely sequence specific TF according to literature or domain structure – No motif	
ZNF649	ENSG00000198093	C2H2 ZF	Known motif – High-throughput in vitro	ATATAA
ZNF652	ENSG00000198740	C2H2 ZF	Inferred motif from similar protein – High-throughput in vitro	
ZNF653	ENSG00000161914	C2H2 ZF; AT hook	Known motif – In vivo/Misc source	WTTHNYDHCYKCCGACWNHWAWD
ZNF654	ENSG00000175105	C2H2 ZF	Likely sequence specific TF according to literature or domain structure – No motif	
ZNF655	ENSG00000197343	C2H2 ZF	Known motif – High-throughput in vitro	RVTAH
ZNF658	ENSG00000274349	C2H2 ZF	Known motif – In vivo/Misc source	GGGGTRGGACGAGGTGGG
ZNF66	ENSG00000160229	C2H2 ZF	Likely sequence specific TF according to literature or domain structure – No motif	
ZNF660	ENSG00000144792	C2H2 ZF	Known motif – High-throughput in vitro	DYAGGDTGGRBHATCADB
ZNF662	ENSG00000182983	C2H2 ZF	Known motif – High-throughput in vitro	DRNAGSMVVGKGMYAGMB
ZNF664	ENSG00000179195	C2H2 ZF	Inferred motif from similar protein – In vivo/Misc source	GTTBAAWMCGC
ZNF665	ENSG00000197497	C2H2 ZF	Likely sequence specific TF according to literature or domain structure – No motif	
ZNF667	ENSG00000198046	C2H2 ZF	Known motif – High-throughput in vitro	GCYTTAARAGCTCANCH
ZNF668	ENSG00000167394	C2H2 ZF	Likely sequence specific TF according to literature or domain structure – No motif	
ZNF669	ENSG00000188295	C2H2 ZF	Known motif – High-throughput in vitro	VNHHRSANYGGTCRTCRNCCH
ZNF670	ENSG00000277462	C2H2 ZF	Likely sequence specific TF according to literature or domain structure – No motif	
ZNF671	ENSG00000083814	C2H2 ZF	Known motif – High-throughput in vitro	GAKTGGADBRV
ZNF672	ENSG00000171161	C2H2 ZF	Likely sequence specific TF according to literature or domain structure – No motif	
ZNF674	ENSG00000251192	C2H2 ZF	Known motif – High-throughput in vitro	GGRBCVCCRVV
ZNF675	ENSG00000197372	C2H2 ZF	Known motif – High-throughput in vitro	RKGVNHNRGRGGMYAAAAYGD
ZNF676	ENSG00000196109	C2H2 ZF	Likely sequence specific TF according to literature or domain structure – No motif	
ZNF677	ENSG00000197928	C2H2 ZF	Known motif – High-throughput in vitro	GRAMMCHRAHAAGAWCAGHH
ZNF678	ENSG00000181450	C2H2 ZF	Likely sequence specific TF according to literature or domain structure – No motif	
ZNF679	ENSG00000197123	C2H2 ZF	Inferred motif from similar protein – In vivo/Misc source	DGGCAGCAGM
ZNF680	ENSG00000173041	C2H2 ZF	Known motif – High-throughput in vitro	HNNNNDGNCMAAGAAGAHTNW
ZNF681	ENSG00000196172	C2H2 ZF	Known motif – High-throughput in vitro	VAAGGABGVNGR
ZNF682	ENSG00000197124	C2H2 ZF	Known motif – High-throughput in vitro	DDHYMAGCCC
ZNF683	ENSG00000176083	C2H2 ZF	Likely sequence specific TF according to literature or domain structure – No motif	
ZNF684	ENSG00000117010	C2H2 ZF	Known motif – High-throughput in vitro	BACAGTCCACCCCTTDV
ZNF687	ENSG00000143373	C2H2 ZF	Likely sequence specific TF according to literature or domain structure – No motif	
ZNF688	ENSG00000229809	C2H2 ZF	Likely sequence specific TF according to literature or domain structure – No motif	
ZNF689	ENSG00000156853	C2H2 ZF	Likely sequence specific TF according to literature or domain structure – No motif	
ZNF69	ENSG00000198429	C2H2 ZF	Known motif – In vivo/Misc source	GGRGSHGGGGBDGGV
ZNF691	ENSG00000164011	C2H2 ZF	Inferred motif from similar protein – High-throughput in vitro	RKGAGYAC
ZNF692	ENSG00000171163	C2H2 ZF	Known motif – In vivo/Misc source	SBGGGVCCCACH
ZNF695	ENSG00000197472	C2H2 ZF	Known motif – In vivo/Misc source	ACCAMMHMC
ZNF696	ENSG00000185730	C2H2 ZF	Likely sequence specific TF according to literature or domain structure – No motif	
ZNF697	ENSG00000143067	C2H2 ZF	Inferred motif from similar protein – In vivo/Misc source	KKKGCGAGGGM
ZNF699	ENSG00000196110	C2H2 ZF	Likely sequence specific TF according to literature or domain structure – No motif	
ZNF7	ENSG00000147789	C2H2 ZF	Known motif – High-throughput in vitro	VWRRMADYWNYAARWGBWGRC
ZNF70	ENSG00000187792	C2H2 ZF	Likely sequence specific TF according to literature or domain structure – No motif	
ZNF700	ENSG00000196757	C2H2 ZF	Likely sequence specific TF according to literature or domain structure – No motif	
ZNF701	ENSG00000167562	C2H2 ZF	Known motif – High-throughput in vitro	GAGMASYHDRGG
ZNF703	ENSG00000183779	C2H2 ZF	Likely sequence specific TF according to literature or domain structure – No motif	
ZNF704	ENSG00000164684	C2H2 ZF	Known motif – High-throughput in vitro	HRCCGGCCGGYD
ZNF705A	ENSG00000196946	C2H2 ZF	Inferred motif from similar protein – In vivo/Misc source	CCAAAARAAYY
ZNF705B	ENSG00000215356	C2H2 ZF	Inferred motif from similar protein – In vivo/Misc source	CCAAAARAAYY
ZNF705D	ENSG00000215343	C2H2 ZF	Inferred motif from similar protein – In vivo/Misc source	CCAAAARAAYY
ZNF705E	ENSG00000214534	C2H2 ZF	Likely sequence specific TF according to literature or domain structure – No motif	
ZNF705G	ENSG00000215372	C2H2 ZF	Known motif – In vivo/Misc source	RAKAAACCTCY
ZNF706	ENSG00000120963	C2H2 ZF	Likely sequence specific TF according to literature or domain structure – No motif	
ZNF707	ENSG00000181135	C2H2 ZF	Known motif – High-throughput in vitro	DACMAGGAGTGGGGTK
ZNF708	ENSG00000182141	C2H2 ZF	Known motif – High-throughput in vitro	RDDAGGYACAGCH
ZNF709	ENSG00000242852	C2H2 ZF	Likely sequence specific TF according to literature or domain structure – No motif	
ZNF71	ENSG00000197951	C2H2 ZF	Known motif – High-throughput in vitro	BRGNRGSMRRRGVRARRARRGMAA
ZNF710	ENSG00000140548	C2H2 ZF	Likely sequence specific TF according to literature or domain structure – No motif	
ZNF711	ENSG00000147180	C2H2 ZF	Known motif – In vivo/Misc source	MGGCCTVS
ZNF713	ENSG00000178665	C2H2 ZF	Known motif – High-throughput in vitro	WAGAMRAAWGCCACGAA
ZNF714	ENSG00000160352	C2H2 ZF	Known motif – High-throughput in vitro	DKMRKTSCTGCT
ZNF716	ENSG00000182111	C2H2 ZF	Known motif – High-throughput in vitro	VTATTTCY
ZNF717	ENSG00000227124	C2H2 ZF	Likely sequence specific TF according to literature or domain structure – No motif	
ZNF718	ENSG00000250312	C2H2 ZF	Known motif – In vivo/Misc source	GGGRATWGCGM
ZNF721	ENSG00000182903	C2H2 ZF	Likely sequence specific TF according to literature or domain structure – No motif	
ZNF724	ENSG00000196081	C2H2 ZF	Likely sequence specific TF according to literature or domain structure – No motif	
ZNF726	ENSG00000213967	C2H2 ZF	Likely sequence specific TF according to literature or domain structure – No motif	
ZNF727	ENSG00000214652	C2H2 ZF	Known motif – In vivo/Misc source	GGTCCAAWTGM
ZNF728	ENSG00000269067	C2H2 ZF	Likely sequence specific TF according to literature or domain structure – No motif	
ZNF729	ENSG00000196350	C2H2 ZF	Likely sequence specific TF according to literature or domain structure – No motif	
ZNF730	ENSG00000183850	C2H2 ZF	Known motif – High-throughput in vitro	GGGMRGSBRNGG
ZNF732	ENSG00000186777	C2H2 ZF	Likely sequence specific TF according to literature or domain structure – No motif	
ZNF735	ENSG00000223614	C2H2 ZF	Known motif – In vivo/Misc source	DGGCAGCAGM
ZNF736	ENSG00000234444	C2H2 ZF	Known motif – High-throughput in vitro	YCYRGGGYTTTT
ZNF737	ENSG00000237440	C2H2 ZF	Known motif – In vivo/Misc source	RKRVDGRDGVWGGDG
ZNF74	ENSG00000185252	C2H2 ZF	Known motif – In vivo/Misc source	RAAGATGTTCHYYDCVKYRTTRTTTAHVW
ZNF740	ENSG00000139651	C2H2 ZF	Known motif – High-throughput in vitro	YNCCCCCCCCAC
ZNF746	ENSG00000181220	C2H2 ZF	Likely sequence specific TF according to literature or domain structure – No motif	
ZNF747	ENSG00000169955	C2H2 ZF	Likely sequence specific TF according to literature or domain structure – No motif	
ZNF749	ENSG00000186230	C2H2 ZF	Known motif – High-throughput in vitro	GYTGGGGYT
ZNF750	ENSG00000141579	C2H2 ZF	Likely sequence specific TF according to literature or domain structure – No motif	
ZNF75A	ENSG00000162086	C2H2 ZF	Known motif – High-throughput in vitro	TGTGGGAAAASM
ZNF75D	ENSG00000186376	C2H2 ZF	Known motif – High-throughput in vitro	GTGGGAAAKCCTTYH
ZNF76	ENSG00000065029	C2H2 ZF	Known motif – High-throughput in vitro	HWCCCABAATGCAHYRCR
ZNF761	ENSG00000160336	C2H2 ZF	Known motif – In vivo/Misc source	KGDWAATCAKA
ZNF763	ENSG00000197054	C2H2 ZF	Likely sequence specific TF according to literature or domain structure – No motif	
ZNF764	ENSG00000169951	C2H2 ZF	Known motif – In vivo/Misc source	TGCARCCYAGCTCTAYDAGMC
ZNF765	ENSG00000196417	C2H2 ZF	Known motif – High-throughput in vitro	CTBGGCHVNGCMCWGVS
ZNF766	ENSG00000196214	C2H2 ZF	Known motif – In vivo/Misc source	RAKAAACCYYH
ZNF768	ENSG00000169957	C2H2 ZF	Known motif – High-throughput in vitro	CHCAGAGAGGKYRAG
ZNF77	ENSG00000175691	C2H2 ZF	Known motif – In vivo/Misc source	TYMYCACTYCACYHNNNHMAD
ZNF770	ENSG00000198146	C2H2 ZF	Known motif – In vivo/Misc source	GGAGGCYGVVV
ZNF771	ENSG00000179965	C2H2 ZF	Known motif – High-throughput in vitro	RCGCTAACCAYTD
ZNF772	ENSG00000197128	C2H2 ZF	Likely sequence specific TF according to literature or domain structure – No motif	
ZNF773	ENSG00000152439	C2H2 ZF	Likely sequence specific TF according to literature or domain structure – No motif	
ZNF774	ENSG00000196391	C2H2 ZF	Known motif – High-throughput in vitro	DGRRRVRGAGVHDGRRD
ZNF775	ENSG00000196456	C2H2 ZF	Likely sequence specific TF according to literature or domain structure – No motif	
ZNF776	ENSG00000152443	C2H2 ZF	Known motif – High-throughput in vitro	GAAGCAHRRYGCYGGCATCTG
ZNF777	ENSG00000196453	C2H2 ZF	Known motif – In vivo/Misc source	GHCCSYCCCGTCSARCAAW
ZNF778	ENSG00000170100	C2H2 ZF	Known motif – High-throughput in vitro	CAGACRMCRRCH
ZNF780A	ENSG00000197782	C2H2 ZF	Known motif – High-throughput in vitro	VNNNNDNNHDGGCAGGYNBNYDDV
ZNF780B	ENSG00000128000	C2H2 ZF	Likely sequence specific TF according to literature or domain structure – No motif	
ZNF781	ENSG00000196381	C2H2 ZF	Likely sequence specific TF according to literature or domain structure – No motif	
ZNF782	ENSG00000196597	C2H2 ZF	Known motif – In vivo/Misc source	HARRHCCWACAHVDRGRSHNYCTCAVRVVY
ZNF783	ENSG00000204946	C2H2 ZF	Known motif – In vivo/Misc source	SBTSCWSCDSCDSYDSCWGCT
ZNF784	ENSG00000179922	C2H2 ZF	Known motif – High-throughput in vitro	ACYTWCCK
ZNF785	ENSG00000197162	C2H2 ZF	Known motif – In vivo/Misc source	ACWBRBRCAYACASWYVMMCVMACACASA
ZNF786	ENSG00000197362	C2H2 ZF	Known motif – In vivo/Misc source	CRGRGNCCCRRRGRC
ZNF787	ENSG00000142409	C2H2 ZF	Known motif – High-throughput in vitro	BGAGGCANNNNNNNTGCATY
ZNF788	ENSG00000214189	C2H2 ZF	Likely sequence specific TF according to literature or domain structure – No motif	
ZNF789	ENSG00000198556	C2H2 ZF	Known motif – High-throughput in vitro	CYYSTGACACCH
ZNF79	ENSG00000196152	C2H2 ZF	Known motif – High-throughput in vitro	AAAVRAAWDAATNTCTAA
ZNF790	ENSG00000197863	C2H2 ZF	Known motif – High-throughput in vitro	GTGCAGCA
ZNF791	ENSG00000173875	C2H2 ZF	Known motif – In vivo/Misc source	CKCTGACCCCDCCTCCYBTCTAAA
ZNF792	ENSG00000180884	C2H2 ZF	Known motif – In vivo/Misc source	DRCTGDTKWNHDBAGATAGKR
ZNF793	ENSG00000188227	C2H2 ZF	Known motif – High-throughput in vitro	GARCCCCAAGVV
ZNF799	ENSG00000196466	C2H2 ZF	Known motif – High-throughput in vitro	AYMCYBGYTGTCTCAGTGWTTKGS
ZNF8	ENSG00000278129	C2H2 ZF	Known motif – High-throughput in vitro	DHNDDGRCRTACCRBV
ZNF80	ENSG00000174255	C2H2 ZF	Likely sequence specific TF according to literature or domain structure – No motif	
ZNF800	ENSG00000048405	C2H2 ZF	Likely sequence specific TF according to literature or domain structure – No motif	
ZNF804A	ENSG00000170396	C2H2 ZF	Likely sequence specific TF according to literature or domain structure – No motif	
ZNF804B	ENSG00000182348	C2H2 ZF	Likely sequence specific TF according to literature or domain structure – No motif	
ZNF805	ENSG00000204524	C2H2 ZF	Known motif – High-throughput in vitro	MYKSCATTCCWTKSCWTKYSR
ZNF808	ENSG00000198482	C2H2 ZF	Known motif – High-throughput in vitro	GGNWGGWCTVYAAAVNVSHYKBTHNDKND
ZNF81	ENSG00000197779	C2H2 ZF	Known motif – High-throughput in vitro	TGGTVNHACYABYNNRRA
ZNF813	ENSG00000198346	C2H2 ZF	Likely sequence specific TF according to literature or domain structure – No motif	
ZNF814	ENSG00000204514	C2H2 ZF	Likely sequence specific TF according to literature or domain structure – No motif	
ZNF816	ENSG00000180257	C2H2 ZF	Known motif – High-throughput in vitro	VVNNRDGGGGACMKGHND
ZNF821	ENSG00000102984	C2H2 ZF	Known motif – High-throughput in vitro	HRGACAGACVGACR
ZNF823	ENSG00000197933	C2H2 ZF	Known motif – High-throughput in vitro	HHYTTCTCYNYYBCY
ZNF827	ENSG00000151612	C2H2 ZF	Likely sequence specific TF according to literature or domain structure – No motif	
ZNF829	ENSG00000185869	C2H2 ZF	Likely sequence specific TF according to literature or domain structure – No motif	
ZNF83	ENSG00000167766	C2H2 ZF	Likely sequence specific TF according to literature or domain structure – No motif	
ZNF830	ENSG00000198783	C2H2 ZF	Likely sequence specific TF according to literature or domain structure – No motif	
ZNF831	ENSG00000124203	C2H2 ZF	Likely sequence specific TF according to literature or domain structure – No motif	
ZNF835	ENSG00000127903	C2H2 ZF	Likely sequence specific TF according to literature or domain structure – No motif	
ZNF836	ENSG00000196267	C2H2 ZF	Likely sequence specific TF according to literature or domain structure – No motif	
ZNF837	ENSG00000152475	C2H2 ZF	Likely sequence specific TF according to literature or domain structure – No motif	
ZNF84	ENSG00000198040	C2H2 ZF	Known motif – High-throughput in vitro	RVRRVNNVNRDGAACAGGMAR
ZNF841	ENSG00000197608	C2H2 ZF	Likely sequence specific TF according to literature or domain structure – No motif	
ZNF843	ENSG00000176723	C2H2 ZF	Likely sequence specific TF according to literature or domain structure – No motif	
ZNF844	ENSG00000223547	C2H2 ZF	Likely sequence specific TF according to literature or domain structure – No motif	
ZNF845	ENSG00000213799	C2H2 ZF	Likely sequence specific TF according to literature or domain structure – No motif	
ZNF846	ENSG00000196605	C2H2 ZF	Known motif – In vivo/Misc source	GVGSMVGGGMSVSVG
ZNF85	ENSG00000105750	C2H2 ZF	Known motif – High-throughput in vitro	BRGATTMCWKCA
ZNF850	ENSG00000267041	C2H2 ZF	Likely sequence specific TF according to literature or domain structure – No motif	
ZNF852	ENSG00000178917	C2H2 ZF	Inferred motif from similar protein – High-throughput in vitro	VYAHACTKTNRAGYGV
ZNF853	ENSG00000236609	C2H2 ZF	Likely sequence specific TF according to literature or domain structure – No motif	
ZNF860	ENSG00000197385	C2H2 ZF	Known motif – High-throughput in vitro	VRCAGGGAGCVRVVS
ZNF865	ENSG00000261221	C2H2 ZF	Likely sequence specific TF according to literature or domain structure – No motif	
ZNF878	ENSG00000257446	C2H2 ZF	Likely sequence specific TF according to literature or domain structure – No motif	
ZNF879	ENSG00000234284	C2H2 ZF	Known motif – High-throughput in vitro	AHARHAMWAHWRAAMMWANWWRVH
ZNF880	ENSG00000221923	C2H2 ZF	Known motif – High-throughput in vitro	DDNDDVDNGGGRRDGGGARAGDGMAR
ZNF883	ENSG00000228623	C2H2 ZF	Known motif – In vivo/Misc source	GAGGCAGCCACH
ZNF888	ENSG00000213793	C2H2 ZF	Likely sequence specific TF according to literature or domain structure – No motif	
ZNF891	ENSG00000214029	C2H2 ZF	Known motif – High-throughput in vitro	BNNNNSNGRCWKCYAGCC
ZNF90	ENSG00000213988	C2H2 ZF	Known motif – High-throughput in vitro	TGGGTGDRTMAKCAG
ZNF91	ENSG00000167232	C2H2 ZF	Likely sequence specific TF according to literature or domain structure – No motif	
ZNF92	ENSG00000146757	C2H2 ZF	Likely sequence specific TF according to literature or domain structure – No motif	
ZNF93	ENSG00000184635	C2H2 ZF	Known motif – High-throughput in vitro	BNNNBNHNGCWGCHRBSNYWGCTRCYDYC
ZNF98	ENSG00000197360	C2H2 ZF	Known motif – High-throughput in vitro	VNADRKMCAANAAAAAGGHM
ZNF99	ENSG00000213973	C2H2 ZF	Likely sequence specific TF according to literature or domain structure – No motif	
ZSCAN1	ENSG00000152467	C2H2 ZF	Known motif – High-throughput in vitro	HRCACACVCTGHMAVH
ZSCAN10	ENSG00000130182	C2H2 ZF	Inferred motif from similar protein – High-throughput in vitro	GDRAGTGC
ZSCAN12	ENSG00000158691	C2H2 ZF	Likely sequence specific TF according to literature or domain structure – No motif	
ZSCAN16	ENSG00000196812	C2H2 ZF	Known motif – High-throughput in vitro	GAGGCTCTGTTAACANY
ZSCAN18	ENSG00000121413	C2H2 ZF	Likely sequence specific TF according to literature or domain structure – No motif	
ZSCAN2	ENSG00000176371	C2H2 ZF	Likely sequence specific TF according to literature or domain structure – No motif	
ZSCAN20	ENSG00000121903	C2H2 ZF	Likely sequence specific TF according to literature or domain structure – No motif	
ZSCAN21	ENSG00000166529	C2H2 ZF	Likely sequence specific TF according to literature or domain structure – No motif	
ZSCAN22	ENSG00000182318	C2H2 ZF	Known motif – High-throughput in vitro	GNCHGABGGMGGAGGCNV
ZSCAN23	ENSG00000187987	C2H2 ZF	Known motif – High-throughput in vitro	BTGTAATTAGCACATGR
ZSCAN25	ENSG00000197037	C2H2 ZF	Likely sequence specific TF according to literature or domain structure – No motif	
ZSCAN26	ENSG00000197062	C2H2 ZF	Known motif – In vivo/Misc source	TGGGGGGCATM
ZSCAN29	ENSG00000140265	C2H2 ZF	Known motif – High-throughput in vitro	MCGYRTARMCGKCTAYRC
ZSCAN30	ENSG00000186814	C2H2 ZF	Known motif – High-throughput in vitro	BCCWGSRGCCHBSVS
ZSCAN31	ENSG00000235109	C2H2 ZF	Known motif – High-throughput in vitro	GHHGCAGGGCARTTATGC
ZSCAN32	ENSG00000140987	C2H2 ZF	Likely sequence specific TF according to literature or domain structure – No motif	
ZSCAN4	ENSG00000180532	C2H2 ZF	Known motif – High-throughput in vitro	HGCACACVCTGNMA
ZSCAN5A	ENSG00000131848	C2H2 ZF	Known motif – High-throughput in vitro	HKTCCCYVCVCAAADM
ZSCAN5B	ENSG00000197213	C2H2 ZF	Likely sequence specific TF according to literature or domain structure – No motif	
ZSCAN5C	ENSG00000204532	C2H2 ZF	Known motif – High-throughput in vitro	GTGAGTNHAYRRRNV
ZSCAN9	ENSG00000137185	C2H2 ZF	Known motif – High-throughput in vitro	DRKGATAAGATAAGAABCM
ZUFSP	ENSG00000153975	C2H2 ZF	Likely sequence specific TF according to literature or domain structure – No motif	
ZXDA	ENSG00000198205	C2H2 ZF	Likely sequence specific TF according to literature or domain structure – No motif	
ZXDB	ENSG00000198455	C2H2 ZF	Likely sequence specific TF according to literature or domain structure – No motif	
ZXDC	ENSG00000070476	C2H2 ZF	Likely sequence specific TF according to literature or domain structure – No motif	
ZZZ3	ENSG00000036549	Myb/SANT	Known motif – High-throughput in vitro	SAATCCAW
