= ETS transcription factor family =

Protein family

Ets-domain
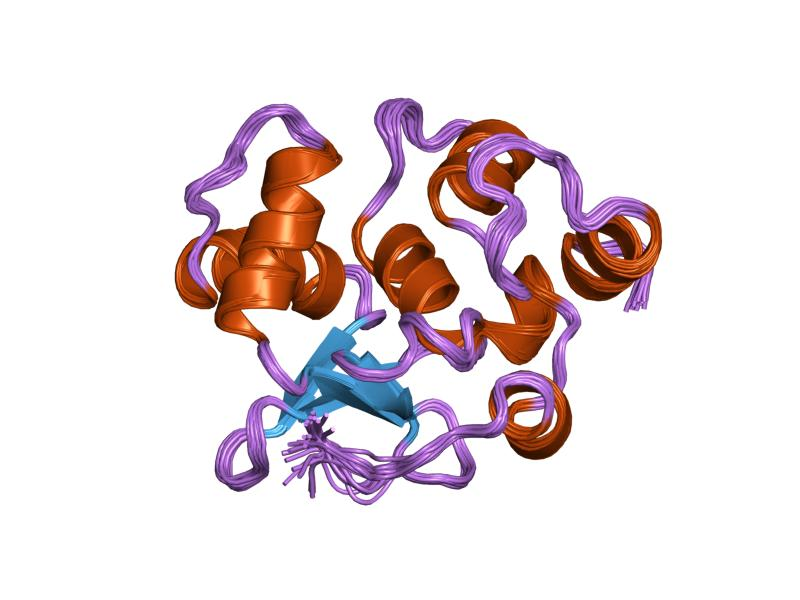
- Structure of Ets-1 DNA binding autoinhibition.

Identifiers
- Symbol: Ets
- Pfam: PF00178
- Pfam clan: CL0123
- InterPro: IPR000418
- SMART: SM00413
- PROSITE: PDOC00374
- SCOP2: 1r36 / SCOPe / SUPFAM
Available protein structures:
- PDB: 1awc, 1bc7, 1bc8, 1dux, 1fli, 1gvj, 1hbx, 1k6o, 1k78, 1k79, 1k7a, 1md0, 1mdm, 1pue, 1r36, 1wwx, 1yo5, 2nny, 2stt, 2stw IPR000418 PF00178 (ECOD; PDBsum)
- AlphaFold: IPR000418; PF00178

In the field of molecular biology, the ETS (E26 transformation-specific or erythroblast transformation-specific) family is one of the largest families of transcription factors and is unique to animals. There are 28 genes in humans, 27 in the mouse, 10 in Caenorhabditis elegans and 9 in Drosophila. The founding member of this family was identified as a gene transduced by the avian leukosis virus, E26, which causes erythroblastosis in birds. Members of this family have been implicated in the development of different tissues as well as cancer progression.

== Subfamilies ==
The ETS (erythroblast transformation-specific) family is divided into 12 subfamilies, which are listed below:

Subfamily	Mammalian family members	Invertebrate orthologs
ELF	ELF1, ELF2 (NERF), ELF4 (MEF)	
ELG	GABPα	ELG
ERG	ERG, FLI1, FEV	
ERF	ERF (PE2), ETV3 (PE1), ETV3L	
ESE	ELF3 (ESE1/ESX), ELF5 (ESE2), ESE3 (EHF)	
ETS	ETS1, ETS2	POINTED
PDEF	SPDEF (PDEF/PSE)	
PEA3	ETV4 (PEA3/E1AF), ETV5 (ERM), ETV1 (ER81)	
ER71	ETV2 (ER71)	
SPI	SPI1 (PU.1), SPIB, SPIC	
TCF	ELK1, ELK4 (SAP1), ELK3 (NET/SAP2)	LIN
TEL	ETV6 (TEL), ETV7 (TEL2)	YAN

== Structure ==
All ETS (Erythroblast Transformation Specific) family members are identified through a highly conserved DNA binding domain, the ETS domain, which is a winged helix-turn-helix structure that binds to DNA sites with a central GGA(A/T) DNA sequence. As well as DNA-binding functions, evidence suggests that the ETS domain is also involved in protein-protein interactions. There is limited similarity outside the ETS DNA binding domain.

Other domains are also present and vary from ETS member to ETS member, including the Pointed domain, a subclass of the SAM domain family.

== Function ==
The ETS family is present throughout the body and is involved in a wide variety of functions including the regulation of cellular differentiation, cell cycle control, cell migration, cell proliferation, apoptosis (programmed cell death) and angiogenesis.

Multiple ETS factors have been found to be associated with cancer, such as through gene fusion. For example, the ERG ETS transcription factor is fused to the EWS gene, resulting in a condition called Ewing's sarcoma. The fusion of TEL to the JAK2 protein results in early pre-B acute lymphoid leukaemia. ERG and ETV1 are known gene fusions found in prostate cancer.

In addition, ETS factors, e.g. the vertebrate Etv1 and the invertebrate Ast-1, have been shown to be important players in the specification and differentiation of dopaminergic neurons in both C. elegans and olfactory bulbs of mice.

== Mode of action ==
Amongst members of the ETS family, there is extensive conservation in the DNA-binding ETS domain and, therefore, a lot of redundancy in DNA binding. It is thought that interactions with other proteins (eg: Modulator of the activity of Ets called Mae) is one way in which specific binding to DNA is achieved. Transcription factor Ets are a site of signalling convergence. ETS factors act as transcriptional repressors, transcriptional activators, or both.
