= C19orf38 =

Identifiers
- Aliases: C19orf38, HIDE1, chromosome 19 open reading frame 38
- External IDs: MGI: 3043001; GeneCards: C19orf38

Gene location (Human)
Chr.	Chromosome 19 (human)
Band	19p13.2	Start	10,836,575 bp
Band	19p13.2	End	10,869,790 bp

Gene location (Mouse)
Chr.	Chromosome 9 (mouse)
Band	9|9 A3	Start	21,437,472 bp
Band	9|9 A3	End	21,456,629 bp
RNA expression pattern
Bgee	Human / Mouse (ortholog); Top expressed in: monocyte; granulocyte; blood; bone marrow; bone marrow cell; gonad; spleen; testicle; appendix; right testis / Top expressed in: granulocyte; spleen; bone marrow; blood; mesenteric lymph nodes; stroma of bone marrow; thymus; blastocyst; otolith organ; utricle; More reference expression data
BioGPS	n/a
Orthologs
Databases	NCBI: entry; OMA: entry
Species	Human	Mouse
Entrez	255809	382062
Ensembl	ENSG00000214212	ENSMUSG00000057191
UniProt	A8MVS5	Q75VT8
RefSeq (mRNA)	NM_001136482	NM_001198794; NM_206536
RefSeq (protein)	NP_001129954	NP_001185723; NP_996259
Location (UCSC)	Chr 19: 10.84 – 10.87 Mb	Chr 9: 21.44 – 21.46 Mb
PubMed search
- Wikidata
View/Edit Human	View/Edit Mouse

Highly Expressed In Immature Dendritic Cell Transcript 1 (HIDE1) is a protein encoded by chromosome 19 open reading frame 38 (C19orf38) gene in humans. C19orf38 is only expressed in white blood cells, of the innate immune system. HIDE1 protein has been found to play a role in immune escape of tumors and diet induced obesity.

== Gene ==
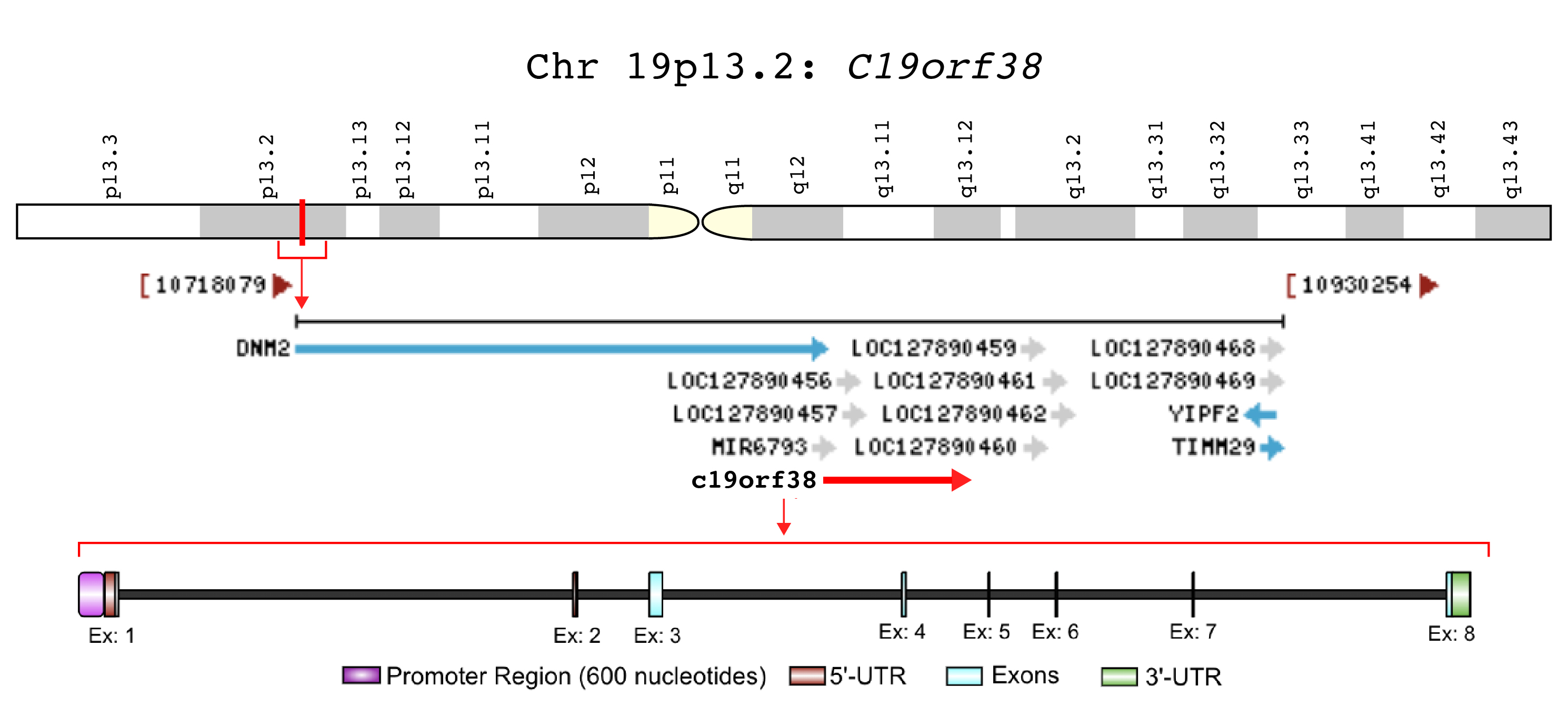
C19orf38 location on chromosome 19, gene neighborhood, and gene overview.

=== Risk-associated variants ===
There are five risk associated variants found within the c19orf38 gene. Three of which lead to a significant increase in low density lipoprotein cholesterol. One variant is associated with prevalence of coronary artery disease. And the fifth identified risk variant is associated with increased reporting of Idiopathic knee osteoarthritis.

== mRNA transcripts ==
=== Isoforms ===
C19orf38 can be alternatively spliced to form three distinct mRNA products. Both isoform's 1 and 2 differ only via the 5' UTR. Isoform 3 has a different protein product in that the mRNA transcript does not contain exon 2 or exon 3, however, isoform 3 is not expressed in humans.

=== Tissue localization ===
C19orf38 transcript is found at the highest amount in bone marrow, with less than a fifth of the transcript amount in the spleen, testis, appendix, and lymph nodes, with little to no transcript in other tissue types. Tissues with the transcript have a high leukocyte presence. It is exclusively present in the following cell types: monocytes, peripheral blood mononuclear cells, eosinophils and basophil's, so any expression in tissues comes from innate immune cells, or granulocytes. Transcript is not present in neutrophils. C19orf38 transcript is not found in macrophages, despite, classical monocyte expression.

=== Regulation of transcription ===
The promoter region of C19orf38 contains two transcription factor binding domains that are particularly important for innate immune system development: Spi-C Transcription Factor (SPIC) and E74 Like ETS Transcription Factor 3 (ELF3). Both are transcription factors are only present in leukocytes are involved in the negative transcription of genes for the development of macrophages, which coincides with cellular localization of C19orf38.

== Protein ==
=== Structure ===
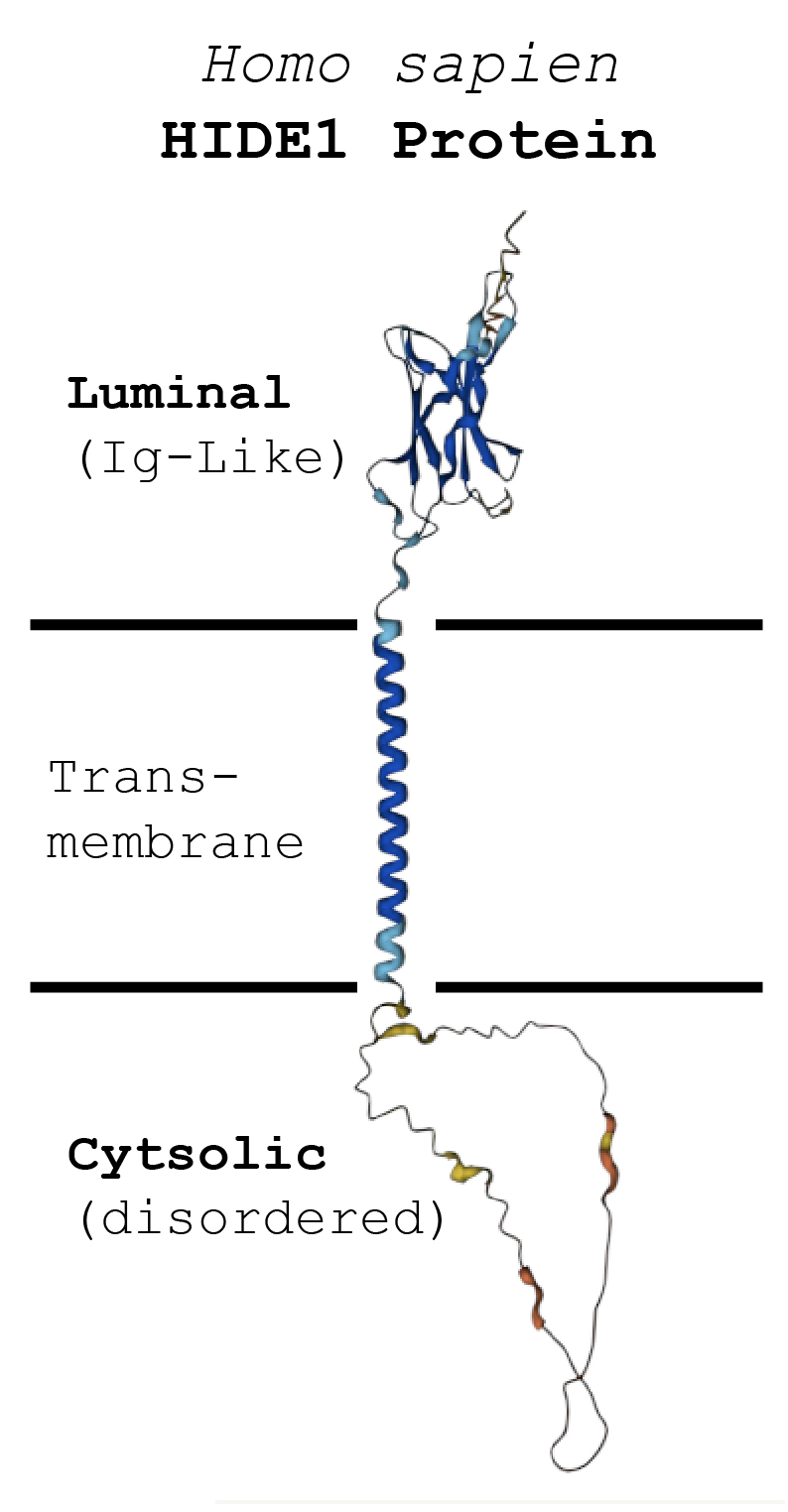
HIDE1 protein three-dimensional structure.

HIDE1 is a 230 amino acid transmembrane protein, anchored via ɑ-helix transmembrane region. F-box only protein 2 (FBXO2) binds in an extracellular region to glycosylated arginine amino acids found at positions 48 and 97. The extracellular region also contains a highly conserved signal peptide sequence, which leads the protein to the membrane space. Additionally, HIDE1 protein contains a disordered region in its intracellular region. TNPO3 and XPO-4 are known to interact with HIDE1.

=== Sub-cellular localization ===
Human HIDE1 protein is largely confirmed to be a signal protein existing either embedded within the cellular membrane or in a secreted form. Deeploc signal analysis predicts a signal peptide region at the start of its translation. Furthermore, PSORT2 k-NN prediction finds the protein to be localized extracellularly 34.8% of the time, 30.4% in the plasma membrane, 21.7% in the endoplasmic reticulum, and 13.0% in the golgi bodies.

== Binding motifs ==
HIDE1 protein contains an ig-like domain and signal peptide in its extracellular region as well as multiple lipidification sites to assist with membrane association. Additionally, N-linked glycosylation sites can be found in the luminal side. The intracellular/cytoplasmic region contains multiple phosphorylation sites and calpain cleavage locations.

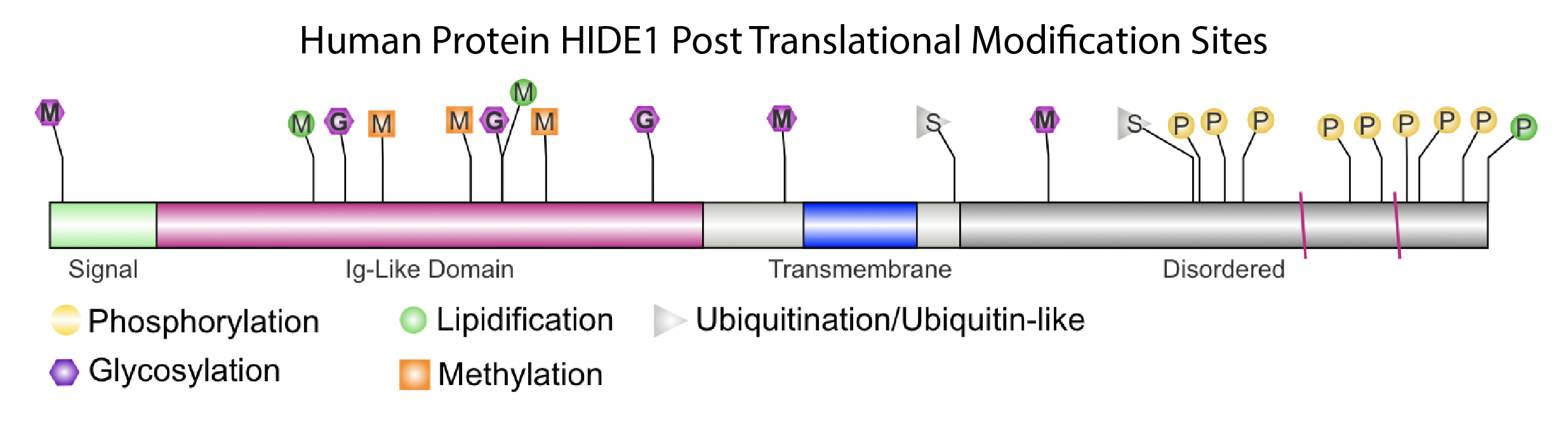
Human Protein HIDE1 domain, motif, and post translational modification diagram.

== Homology ==
=== Orthologs ===
Orthologs are found in the following taxon classes: Mammalia, Reptilia, Aves, and Amphibia. There are no orthologs found in either class Insecta or Actinopterygii. C19orf38 is only present in jawed vertebrates which coincides with the divergence of adaptive immune systems 550 MYA between jawed and jawless vertebrates.

Table of C19orf38 transcript orthologs and related properties. Data is organized by median date of divergence (MYA), and then sequence identity to Homo sapien (Hsa) protein.	human C19orf38 unrooted evolutionary tree.

=== Evolutionary rate ===
C19orf38 mutation rate is found to be less than that of fibrinogen alpha, but is high in comparison to other human proteins, especially, immune proteins which are highly conserved in jawed vertebrates.

== Clinical significance ==
HIDE1 shows no significant association with any cancer.
