= PGCKA1 =

Human C4orf19 gene

Identifiers
- Aliases: PGCKA1, chromosome 4 open reading frame 19, C4orf19, PDCD10 And GCKIII Kinases Associated 1
- External IDs: MGI: 1923511; GeneCards: PGCKA1

Gene location (Human)
Chr.	Chromosome 4 (human)
Band	4p14	Start	37,453,925 bp
Band	4p14	End	37,623,495 bp

Gene location (Mouse)
Chr.	Chromosome 5 (mouse)
Band	5|5 C3.1	Start	63,969,706 bp
Band	5|5 C3.1	End	64,056,968 bp
RNA expression pattern
Bgee	Human / Mouse (ortholog); Top expressed in: amniotic fluid; pancreatic ductal cell; mucosa of sigmoid colon; parotid gland; oocyte; secondary oocyte; mucosa of ileum; rectum; mucosa of transverse colon; islet of Langerhans / Top expressed in: epithelium of stomach; interventricular septum; islet of Langerhans; pyloric antrum; right kidney; mucous cell of stomach; duodenum; yolk sac; colon; Paneth cell; More reference expression data
BioGPS	n/a
Orthologs
Databases	NCBI: entry; OMA: entry
Species	Human	Mouse
Entrez	55286	76261
Ensembl	ENSG00000154274	ENSMUSG00000060512
UniProt	Q8IY42	Q99K99
RefSeq (mRNA)	NM_001104629; NM_018302	NM_029554
RefSeq (protein)	NP_001098099; NP_060772	NP_083830
Location (UCSC)	Chr 4: 37.45 – 37.62 Mb	Chr 5: 63.97 – 64.06 Mb
PubMed search
- Wikidata
View/Edit Human	View/Edit Mouse

PDCD10 and GCKIII kinases-associated protein 1 is a protein which in humans is encoded by the PGCKA1 gene (previously C4orf19). It is thought to act as a tumor suppressor through its interaction with the KEAP1/USP17/ELK1/CDK6 axis.

== Gene ==
The C4orf19 gene is located at 4p14 on the plus strand of chromosome 4 and spans 170.04 kb and contains 7 exons. The genetic neighborhood of C4orf19 includes LOC101928721, LOC105374402, MIR4801, and NWD2, all located upstream of C4orf19. RELL1 is located downstream of C4orf19.

== mRNA ==
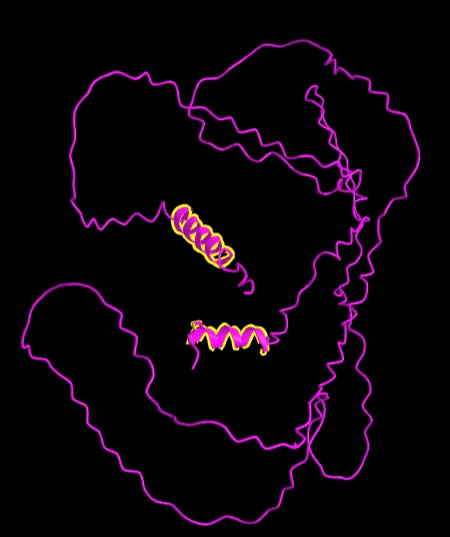
Structural analog of C4orf19, generated by AlphaFold and visualized with NCBI iCn3D. Conserved sequences that were predicted to be alpha helices are highlighted in yellow.

There are four known transcript variants that encode isoforms known as transcript variant 1, transcript variant 2, X1, and X2.

== Protein ==
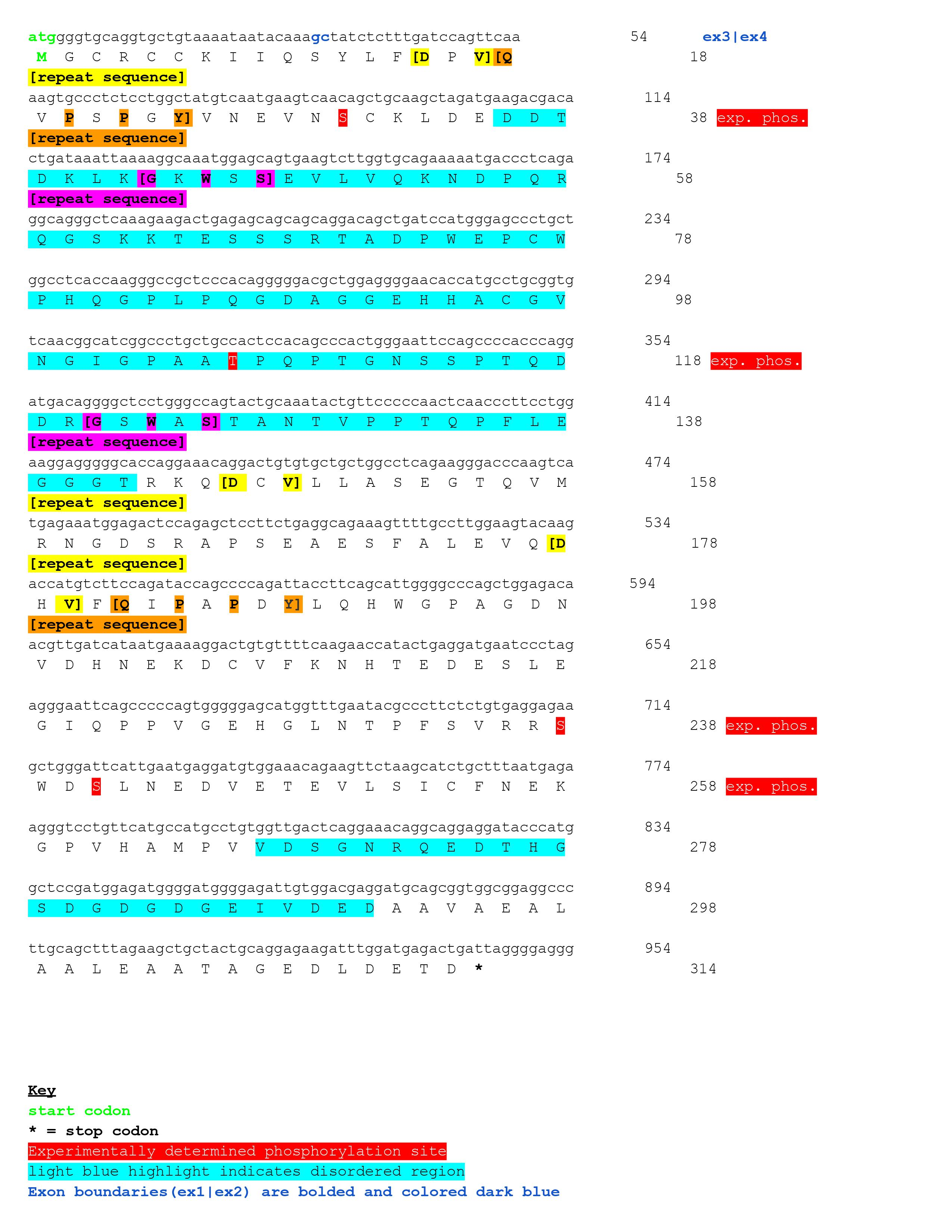
Conceptual translation of C4orf19 protein, with annotation key below. Exon-exon boundaries, phosphorylation sites and internal repeated sequences are marked

C4orf19 encodes a protein with 314 amino acids and a molecular weight of 33.7 kDa. The theoretical isoelectric point of C4orf19 is 4.4.

=== Domains and motifs ===
In humans, the C4orf19 protein contains one domain of unknown function, DUF4699. In eukaryotes the DUF4699 family of proteins are typically between 303 and 319 amino acids in length. DUF4699 spans from amino acid 9 to amino acid 314 in C4orf19. Amongst orthologous proteins, the N-terminus and C-terminus of C4orf19 are most highly conserved.

=== Secondary structure ===
Alpha helices are predicted near the N-terminus and C-terminus of C4orf19 in areas that are conserved amongst orthologous proteins.

=== Post-translational modifications ===
C4orf19 is predicted to undergo several post-translation modifications, including phosphorylation, glycosylation, and SUMOylation.

=== Subcellular localization ===
C4orf19 is predicted to be to be localized in cellular junctions.

== Expression ==
C4orf19 is highly expressed in tissues of the salivary gland, duodenum, small intestine, colon, rectum and kidney. The protein also shows medium levels of expression in tissues of the stomach.

== Interacting proteins ==
Studies using yeast two-hybrid screening have experimentally determined interactions between C4orf19 and PDCD10.

== Homology ==
=== Paralogs ===
There are currently no known paralogs or paralogous domains for C4orf19.

=== Orthologs ===
Orthologs of C4orf19 have been found in mammals, birds, and reptiles. Within class Mammalia, orthologs have been identified in orders Primates, Rodentia, Artiodactyla, Chirpotera, Carnivora, Cingulata, and Diprotodontia. The Burmese python (Python bivittatus) and Eastern fence lizard (Sceloporus undulatus) contain the most distantly related orthologs of C4orf19. Both species diverged from humans an estimated 312 million years ago. C4orf19 orthologs have not yet been identified in bacteria, archaea, protists, plants, fungi, trichoplax, invertebrates, or bony and cartilaginous fish. The following table represents a selection of orthologs found using searches in BLAST.

C4orf19 Orthologs
C4orf19	Genus, species	Common Name	Taxonomic Group	Estimated Divergence Date (MYA)	Accession Number	Sequence Length (aa)	Sequence Identity (%)	Sequence Similarity (%)
Mammalia	Homo sapiens	Humans	Primates	0	NP_060772.2	314	100	100
	Mus musculis	House mouse	Rodentia	90	XP_011239094.1	313	56.2	65.7
	Meriones unguiculatus	Mongolian gerbil	Rodentia	90	XP_021503387.1	311	50.6	60.5
	Bos taurus	Cattle	Artiodactyla	96	NP_001098443.1	321	59.2	67.3
	Myotis brandtii	Brandt's bat	Chiroptera	96	XP_005859800.1	320	61.2	69.6
	Ailuropoda melanoleuca	Giant panda	Carnivora	96	XP_019662032.2	319	59.9	68.7
	Odobenus rosmarus divergens	Pacific walrus	Carnivora	96	XP_004396233.1	319	59.2	69
	Felis catus	Domestic cat	Carnivora	96	XP_023108981.1	319	57.7	66.8
	Puma concolor	Puma	Carnivora	96	XP_025778193.1	319	56.1	65.2
	Dasypus novemcinctus	9 banded armadillo	Cingulata	105	XP_012386176.1	316	62.8	71.9
	Phascolarctos cinereus	Koala	Diprotodontia	159	XP_020847725.1	309	42.6	53.8
Aves	Phasianus colchius	Ring-necked pheasant	Galliformes	312	XP_031444602.1	329	30.7	44.9
	Anas platyrhynchos	Mallard duck	Anseriforms	312	XP_027313057.1	327	32.4	45.9
	Falco peregrinus	Peregrine falcon	Falconiformes	312	XP_005243272.1	323	28.4	46.1
	Tyto alba	Barn owl	Striniformes	312	XP_032855182.2	327	31.5	44.5
	Dromaius novaehollandiae	Emu	Casuariiformes	328	XP_025949540.1	328	33	47.7
Reptilia	Chrysemys picta bellii	Painted turtle	Testudines	312	XP_023962455.1	343	31.5	46.6
	Chelonia mydas	Green sea turtle	Testudines	312	XP_007059772.2	344	33.4	49.4
	Alligator mississippiensis	American alligator	Crocodilia	312	XP_019336018.1	340	31.7	46.7
	Python bivittatus	Burmese python	Squamata	312	XP_015743375.1	319	28.2	42.2
	Sceloporus undulatus	Eastern fence lizard	Squamata	312	XP_042324918.1	310	29.8	42.6
