= C16orf82 =

Protein-coding gene in the species Homo sapiens

Identifiers
- Aliases: C16orf82, TNT, chromosome 16 open reading frame 82
- External IDs: GeneCards: C16orf82

Gene location (Human)
Chr.	Chromosome 16 (human)
Band	16p12.1	Start	27,066,927 bp
Band	16p12.1	End	27,069,166 bp
RNA expression pattern
Bgee	Human / Mouse (ortholog); Top expressed in: left testis; right testis; sperm; testicle; tail of epididymis; metanephros; female breast; lactiferous gland; anterior pituitary; tibial nerve / n/a; More reference expression data
BioGPS	n/a
Orthologs
Databases	NCBI: entry; OMA: entry
Species	Human	Mouse
Entrez	162083	n/a
Ensembl	ENSG00000234186	n/a
UniProt	Q7Z2V1	n/a
RefSeq (mRNA)	NM_182831; NM_001145545	n/a
RefSeq (protein)	NP_001139017	n/a
Location (UCSC)	Chr 16: 27.07 – 27.07 Mb	n/a
PubMed search		n/a
- Wikidata
View/Edit Human

C16orf82 is a protein that, in humans, is encoded by the C16orf82 gene. C16orf82 encodes a 2285 nucleotide mRNA transcript which is translated into a 154 amino acid protein using a non-AUG (CUG) start codon. The gene has been shown to be largely expressed in the testis, tibial nerve, and the pituitary gland, although expression has been seen throughout a majority of tissue types. The function of C16orf82 is not fully understood by the scientific community.

== Gene ==
=== Locus ===
C16orf82 is located in humans at locus 16p12.1 on the positive strand.

=== General features ===
The gene encodes for a 2285 nucleotide mRNA transcript that is intronless. Human intronless genes represent a unique subset of the genome that are often involved in signaling, sperm formation, immune responses, or development. C16orf82 being such a gene indicates it may play a role in one of these processes. Translation of C16orf82 initiates at a non-AUG (CUG) start codon. The presence of the non-canonical start codon suggests possible increased regulation of C16orf82 translation and/or possibly could allow for the translation of protein products that start with leucine instead of methionine as seen in proteins coded for by some genes present in the major histocompatibility complex.

== DNA level regulation ==
=== Promoter ===
The C16orf82 promoter region has been predicted to contain a number of transcription factor binding sites including binding sites for transcription factors within the SOX family. The presence of the SOX family transcription binding sites suggests that C16orf82 may play a role in sex determination. Actual transcription factor functional studies show binding of the C16ORF82 promoter by ARNT, ELF5, SMAD4, and STAT3.

=== Expression ===
C16orf82 expression in humans has been observed in major organ systems including the heart, liver, brain, and kidney at a constant level. The tissue in which C16orf82 has been seen to be most highly expressed has been the testis, both by microarray experiments as well as RNA-seq. C16orf82 expression is also highly variable between individuals, with some expressing the gene in large amounts while others barely express the gene within the same tissue type. Micro RNA (miR-483) over expression has been shown to knock down C16orf82 expression.

== Protein ==
=== General features ===
The C16orf82 protein is 154 amino acids in length with an approximate molecular weight of 16.46 kDa with a predicted isoelectric point of 6.06. There are no known variants or isoforms of C16orf82.

=== Domains ===
C16orf82 contains one domain, DUF4694, which currently has a function that is uncharacterized. The domain spans from amino acid 8 to amino acid 153. DUF4694 contains a SSGY (serine-serine-glycine-tyrosine) sequence motif that is found in a majority of the protein's orthologs. There is no presence of a transmembrane domain thus the protein is not a transmembrane protein.

=== Cellular localization ===
A conceptual diagram of C16orf82's structure. The flags represent sites of predicted phosphorylation and O-linked glycosylation. Grey flags represent phosphorylation sites and red flags represent sites of overlap between phosphorylation and O-linked glycosylation.

The localization of C16orf82 within a cell has been predicted to be nuclear. A bipartite nuclear localization signal can be found starting at Arg107.

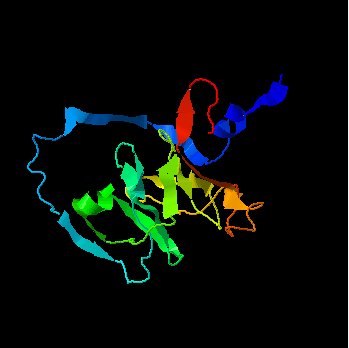
One of the predicted 3D models of the human C16orf82 protein.

=== Post-translational modifications ===
The human C16orf82 protein has been predicted to be phosphorylated at a number of serine residues. O-linked glycosylation has also been predicted to happen at a number of sites, including some that overlap with the aforementioned phosphorylation sites. The sites of overlap between the two types of post-translational modifications could play important regulatory roles in the activity and lifespan of the human C16orf82 protein.

=== Secondary structure ===
The secondary structure of the human C16orf82 protein has been predicted to be largely disordered by a number of modeling programs.

== Evolution/homology ==
=== Paralogs ===
No paralogs of C16orf82 exist within humans.

=== Orthologs ===
C16orf82 has over 100 predicted orthologs, which all reside in the class mammalia and more precisely the subclass eutheria. All of the orthologs contained the domain DUF4964. The most distant ortholog detected was within the nine-banded armadillo (Dasypus novemcinctus) within the order Cingluata. Below is a table of 20 orthologs from various orders within the subclass eutheria with the sequence identity and time since divergence in relation to humans.

Genus and Species	Common Name	Date of divergence (Mya)	Accession number	Protein Sequence length	Sequence Identity (%)
Homo sapiens	Human	0	NP_001139017.1	154	100
Gorilla gorilla gorilla	Gorilla	9.06	XP_004057433.1	217	97
Saimiri boliviensis boliviensis	Bolivian squirrel monkey	43.2	XP_003945340.1	217	81
Carlito syrichta	Philippine tarsier	67.1	XP_008059656.1	194	54
Tupaia chinensis	Chinese tree shrew	82	XP_006148346.2	211	54
Ochotona princeps	American pika	90	XP_004587173.1	184	46
Oryctolagus cuniculus	Rabbit	90	XP_008256138.1	207	49
Microtus ochrogaster	Prairie Vole	90	XP_005372535.1	180	48
Fukomys damarensis	Damara mole-rat	90	XP_010621795.1	188	47
Enhydra lutris kenyoni	Northern Sea Otter	96	XP_022382137.1	168	46
Mustela putorius furo	domestic ferret	96	XP_012901961.1	173	46
Canis lupus familiaris	Dog	96	NP_001139232.1	158	50
Condylura cristata	star-nosed mole	96	XP_004696008.1	199	40
Bos taurus	Cattle	96	NP_001139230.1	156	56
Bison bison bison	American Bison	96	XP_010835728.1	197	55
Capra hircus	Goat	96	XP_013830092.1	201	54
Balaenoptera acutorostrata scammoni	Minke Whale	96	XP_007187042.1	206	52
Equus Caballus	Horse	96	N/A	153	47
Hipposideros armiger	Great Roundleaf Bat	96	XP_019505352.1	192	63
Loxodonta africana	African savanna elephant	105	XP_023414770.1	183	53
Dasypus novemcinctus	nine-banded armadillo	105	XP_012377635.1	238	49

=== Rate of evolution ===
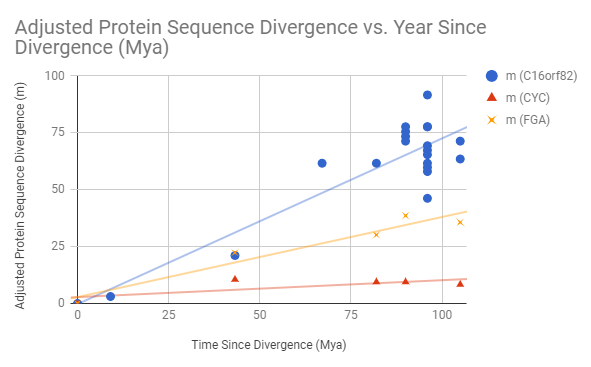
Graph of the adjusted protein sequence divergence of C16orf82, cytochrome C, and fibrinogen using species which contain C16orf82 orthologs.

C16orf82's rate of evolution was determined to be relatively fast even in comparison to fibrinogen, a gene that has been shown to evolve quickly.

== Clinical significance ==
=== Behavioral disorders ===
C16orf82 has been associated with Schizophrenia through a genome-wide association study and autism based on copy number variation analysis. Currently, research has not shown if C16orf82 plays any direct role in either of these disorders.
