= Nerf (disambiguation) =

Nerf is a brand of toy and can also refer to the foam that these toys use.

Nerf may also refer to:

- Nerf (video gaming), a manufacturer's change reducing the utility of a game element
- Nerf bar, a step on the side of a vehicle
- New Ets-related factor (NERF), or ELF2, a transcription factor
- Neural radiance field (NeRF), making 3D model from 2D images in machine learning
- Nerf, a fictional animal in the Star Wars universe
- Nirma Education and Research Foundation, patron of Nirma University
