= MRTFA =

Protein-coding gene in humans

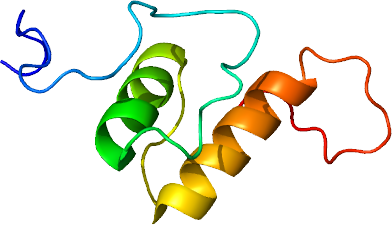

Identifiers
- Aliases: MRTFA, BSAC, MAL, MRTF-A, megakaryoblastic leukemia (translocation) 1, MKL, MKL1, myocardin related transcription factor A
- External IDs: OMIM: 606078; MGI: 2384495; GeneCards: MRTFA
Available structures
PDB	Ortholog search: PDBe RCSB
PDB	List of PDB id codes 2KVU, 2KW9

Gene location (Human)
Chr.	Chromosome 22 (human)
Band	22q13.1-q13.2	Start	40,410,281 bp
Band	22q13.1-q13.2	End	40,636,719 bp

Gene location (Mouse)
Chr.	Chromosome 15 (mouse)
Band	15|15 E1	Start	80,896,482 bp
Band	15|15 E1	End	81,074,958 bp
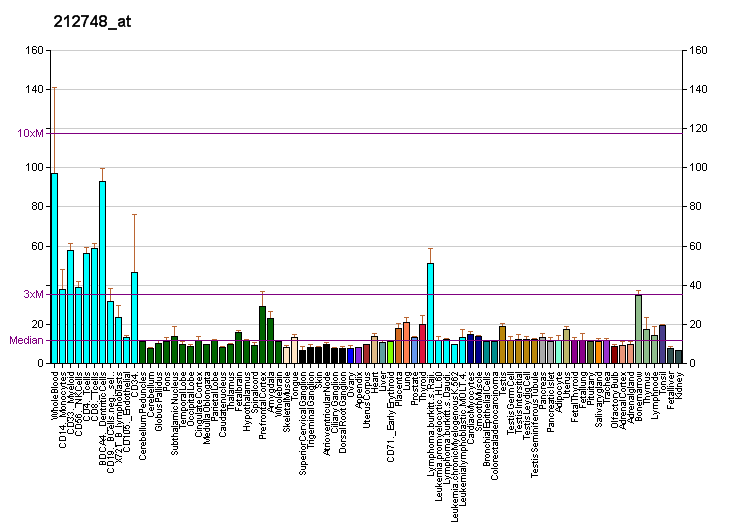

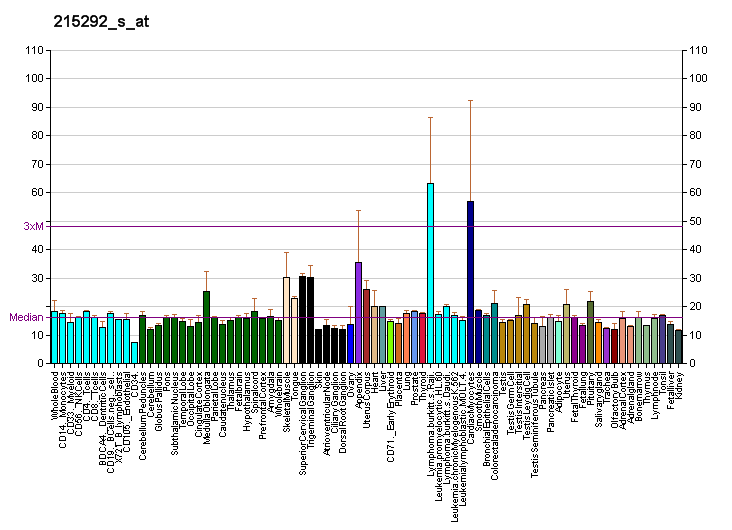
RNA expression pattern
Bgee	Human / Mouse (ortholog); Top expressed in: monocyte; granulocyte; popliteal artery; tibial arteries; right testis; bone marrow cell; left testis; body of uterus; blood; stromal cell of endometrium / Top expressed in: granulocyte; layer of dentate gyrus; granular layer of dentate gyrus; olfactory tubercle; pyramidal layer of hippocampus; mesenteric lymph nodes; Ileal epithelium; dentate gyrus of hippocampal formation granule cell; CA3 field; blood; More reference expression data
BioGPS	More reference expression data
Gene ontology
Molecular function	transcription coactivator activity; actin monomer binding; leucine zipper domain binding; protein binding; actin binding
Cellular component	cytoplasm; nucleoplasm; nucleus; cytosol
Biological process	regulation of transcription, DNA-templated; smooth muscle cell differentiation; transcription, DNA-templated; positive regulation of transcription by RNA polymerase II; transcription by RNA polymerase II; actin cytoskeleton organization
Sources:Amigo / QuickGO
Orthologs
Databases	NCBI: entry; OMA: entry
Species	Human	Mouse
Entrez	57591	223701
Ensembl	ENSG00000196588	ENSMUSG00000042292
UniProt	Q969V6	Q8K4J6
RefSeq (mRNA)	NM_001282660; NM_001282661; NM_001282662; NM_020831; NM_001318139	NM_001082536; NM_153049
RefSeq (protein)	NP_001269589; NP_001269590; NP_001269591; NP_001305068; NP_065882	NP_001076005; NP_694629
Location (UCSC)	Chr 22: 40.41 – 40.64 Mb	Chr 15: 80.9 – 81.07 Mb
PubMed search
- Wikidata
View/Edit Human	View/Edit Mouse

Myocardin-related transcription factor A is a protein that in humans is encoded by the MRTFA gene (previously MKL1).

== Function ==
The protein encoded by this gene is regulated by the actin cytoskeleton and is shuttled between the cytoplasm and the nucleus as a result of actin dynamics. In the nucleus, it coactivates the transcription factor serum response factor, a key regulator of smooth muscle cell differentiation, in an interaction mediated by its Basic domain. It is closely related to MKL2 and myocardin, with which it shares five key conserved structural domains.

== Clinical significance ==
This gene is involved in a specific translocation event that creates a fusion of this gene and the RNA-binding motif protein-15 gene. This translocation has been associated with acute megakaryocytic leukemia. It also functions in the process of normal megakaryocyte maturation.

== Research ==
Elevated MKL1 expression is observed in breast cancer and can predict chemosensitivity and patient survival. MKL1 may be a promising biomarker of clinical value for breast cancer.

== See also ==
- Serum response factor
