= Leucosis =

Viral disease of animals

Leucosis is a leukemia-like malignant viral disease that is found in animals, particularly poultry and cattle.

== Types of leucosis ==
- Bovine leucosis
  - Enzootic bovine leucosis, caused by bovine leukemia virus.
  - Sporadic bovine leucosis
  - Calf lymphosarcoma
- Leucosis in pig
- Leucosis in horses
- Leucosis in sheep
- Feline leucosis
  - Feline leukemia virus
- Avian leucosis and related diseases
  - Avian sarcoma leukosis virus
    - Lymphoid leucosis
    - Erythroblastosis
    - Osteopetrosis
    - Myeloblastose
    - Myelocytomatosis
