= ETV4 =

Protein-coding gene in the species Homo sapiens

Identifiers
- Aliases: ETV4, E1A-F, E1AF, PEA3, PEAS3, ETS variant 4, ETS variant transcription factor 4
- External IDs: OMIM: 600711; MGI: 99423; GeneCards: ETV4
Available structures
PDB	Ortholog search: PDBe RCSB
PDB	List of PDB id codes 4CO8, 4UUV

Gene location (Human)
Chr.	Chromosome 17 (human)
Band	17q21.31	Start	43,527,844 bp
Band	17q21.31	End	43,579,620 bp

Gene location (Mouse)
Chr.	Chromosome 11 (mouse)
Band	11 D|11 65.48 cM	Start	101,660,568 bp
Band	11 D|11 65.48 cM	End	101,676,197 bp
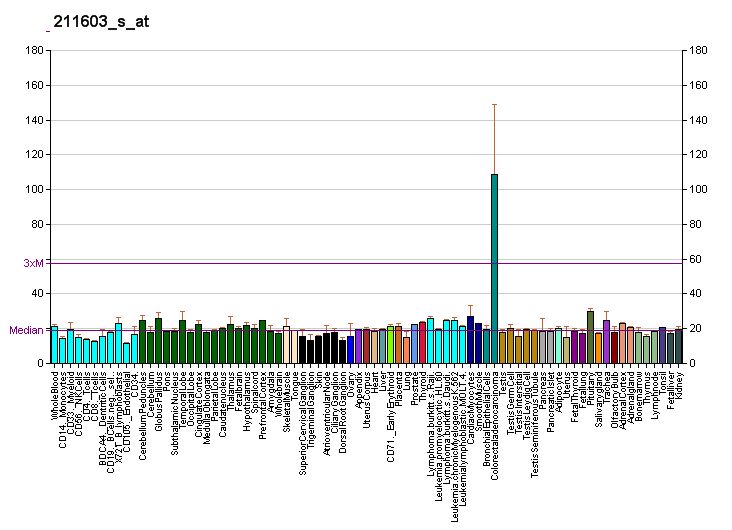
RNA expression pattern
Bgee	Human / Mouse (ortholog); Top expressed in: gonad; pituitary gland; testicle; anterior pituitary; mucosa of pharynx; pericardium; nipple; sural nerve; gallbladder; skin of limb / Top expressed in: palate; soft palate; tail of embryo; cardiac muscle tissue of left ventricle; lip; palatoglossus muscle; epiblast; extensor digitorum longus muscle; urethra; tongue; More reference expression data
BioGPS	More reference expression data
Gene ontology
Molecular function	DNA binding; sequence-specific DNA binding; DNA-binding transcription factor activity; DNA-binding transcription activator activity, RNA polymerase II-specific; RNA polymerase II cis-regulatory region sequence-specific DNA binding; protein binding; DNA-binding transcription factor activity, RNA polymerase II-specific
Cellular component	nucleoplasm; nucleolus; nucleus
Biological process	cell differentiation; regulation of transcription, DNA-templated; transcription, DNA-templated; transcription by RNA polymerase II; positive regulation of transcription by RNA polymerase II; regulation of transcription by RNA polymerase II
Sources:Amigo / QuickGO
Orthologs
Databases	NCBI: entry; OMA: entry
Species	Human	Mouse
Entrez	2118	18612
Ensembl	ENSG00000175832	ENSMUSG00000017724
UniProt	P43268	P28322
RefSeq (mRNA)	NM_001079675; NM_001261437; NM_001261438; NM_001261439; NM_001986 NM_001369366; NM_001369367; NM_001369368	NM_008815; NM_001316365; NM_001316366
RefSeq (protein)	NP_001073143; NP_001248366; NP_001248367; NP_001248368; NP_001977 NP_001356295; NP_001356296; NP_001356297	NP_001303294; NP_001303295; NP_032841
Location (UCSC)	Chr 17: 43.53 – 43.58 Mb	Chr 11: 101.66 – 101.68 Mb
PubMed search
- Wikidata
View/Edit Human	View/Edit Mouse

ETS translocation variant 4 (ETV4), also known as polyoma enhancer activator 3 (PEA3), is a member of the PEA3 subfamily of Ets transcription factors.

== Disease marker ==
Two variants of a disease associated with ETV4 is Ewing Sarcoma and Extraosseous Ewing's Sarcoma. While both are cancerous tumors, the former grows in the bones most commonly affecting the arms, legs, hips, and spine, while the later affects the soft tissue in the chest, foot, pelvis and spine.
