= Erythroblastosis =

Erythroblastosis refers to an abnormally large number of circulating erythroblasts, which are red blood cells that retain a nucleus. In humans, this can occur during fetal development in a condition known as erythroblastosis fetalis or hemolytic disease of the newborn. In poultry, avian erythroblastosis can result from a viral infection that presents as leucosis.
