= ASCC3 =

Protein-coding gene in the species Homo sapiens

Identifiers
- Aliases: ASCC3, ASC1p200, HELIC1, RNAH, activating signal cointegrator 1 complex subunit 3
- External IDs: OMIM: 614217; MGI: 1925237; GeneCards: ASCC3
Enzyme activity
EC #	BRENDA	ExPASy	KEGG	MetaCyc
5.6.2.4	↗	↗	↗	↗

Gene location (Human)
Chr.	Chromosome 6 (human)
Band	6q16.3	Start	100,508,194 bp
Band	6q16.3	End	100,881,372 bp

Gene location (Mouse)
Chr.	Chromosome 10 (mouse)
Band	10|10 B3	Start	50,468,765 bp
Band	10|10 B3	End	50,727,581 bp
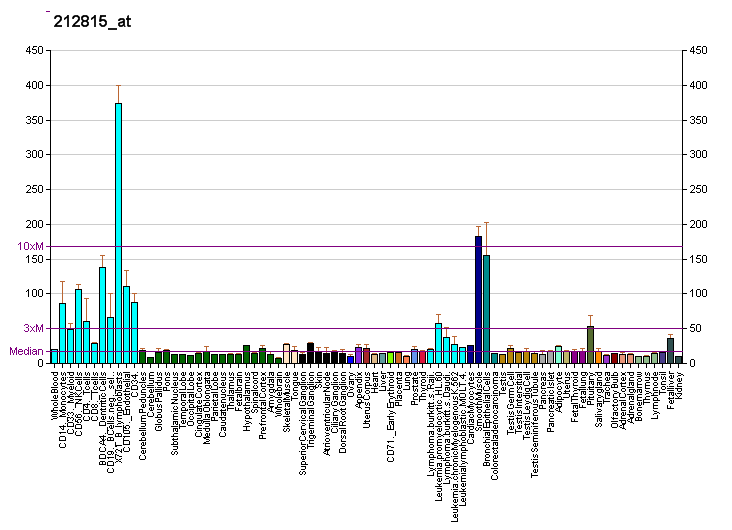
RNA expression pattern
Bgee	Human / Mouse (ortholog); Top expressed in: decidua; secondary oocyte; Achilles tendon; gonad; stromal cell of endometrium; ventricular zone; testicle; islet of Langerhans; bone marrow cell; right coronary artery / Top expressed in: spermatid; tail of embryo; gastrula; spermatocyte; genital tubercle; epithelium of small intestine; supraoptic nucleus; hand; ascending aorta; submandibular gland; More reference expression data
BioGPS	More reference expression data
Gene ontology
Molecular function	nucleotide binding; 3'-5' DNA helicase activity; protein binding; hydrolase activity; ATP binding; helicase activity; nucleic acid binding; RNA binding
Cellular component	intracellular anatomical structure; membrane; nucleoplasm; nucleus; cytosol; activating signal cointegrator 1 complex; nuclear speck; cytoplasm; Golgi apparatus
Biological process	DNA dealkylation involved in DNA repair; DNA duplex unwinding; cell population proliferation; regulation of transcription, DNA-templated; transcription, DNA-templated; cellular response to DNA damage stimulus; DNA repair
Sources:Amigo / QuickGO
Orthologs
Databases	NCBI: entry; OMA: entry
Species	Human	Mouse
Entrez	10973	77987
Ensembl	ENSG00000112249	ENSMUSG00000038774
UniProt	Q8N3C0	E9PZJ8
RefSeq (mRNA)	NM_001284271; NM_006828; NM_022091	NM_198007
RefSeq (protein)	NP_001271200; NP_006819; NP_071374	NP_932124
Location (UCSC)	Chr 6: 100.51 – 100.88 Mb	Chr 10: 50.47 – 50.73 Mb
PubMed search
- Wikidata
View/Edit Human	View/Edit Mouse

Activating signal cointegrator 1 complex subunit 3 is a protein that in humans is encoded by the ASCC3 gene.

== Interactions ==
ASCC3 has been shown to interact with RELA, C-jun and Serum response factor.
