= MRTFB =

Protein-coding gene in humans

Identifiers
- Aliases: MRTFB, MRTF-B, NPD001, MKL1/myocardin like 2, myocardin related transcription factor B, MKL2
- External IDs: OMIM: 609463; MGI: 3050795; GeneCards: MRTFB

Gene location (Human)
Chr.	Chromosome 16 (human)
Band	16p13.12	Start	14,071,321 bp
Band	16p13.12	End	14,266,773 bp

Gene location (Mouse)
Chr.	Chromosome 16 (mouse)
Band	16|16 A1	Start	13,074,345 bp
Band	16|16 A1	End	13,235,393 bp
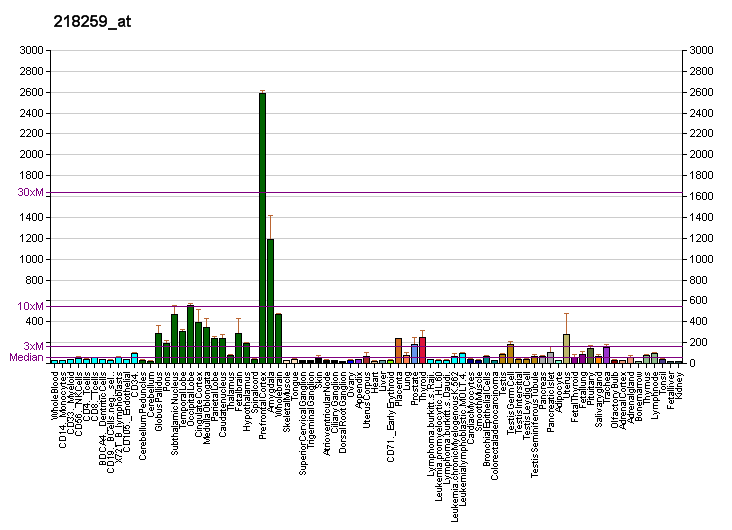
RNA expression pattern
Bgee	Human / Mouse (ortholog); Top expressed in: Brodmann area 23; endothelial cell; middle temporal gyrus; Region I of hippocampus proper; entorhinal cortex; superior frontal gyrus; orbitofrontal cortex; postcentral gyrus; visceral pleura; Brodmann area 46 / Top expressed in: olfactory tubercle; piriform cortex; nucleus accumbens; primary motor cortex; anterior amygdaloid area; cingulate gyrus; lateral septal nucleus; ventromedial nucleus; Region I of hippocampus proper; subiculum; More reference expression data
BioGPS	More reference expression data
Gene ontology
Molecular function	transcription coactivator activity; protein binding; cadherin binding
Cellular component	nucleus
Biological process	multicellular organism development; muscle organ development; regulation of transcription, DNA-templated; smooth muscle cell differentiation; positive regulation of striated muscle tissue development; positive regulation of transcription by RNA polymerase II; cell differentiation; transcription, DNA-templated; transcription by RNA polymerase II
Sources:Amigo / QuickGO
Orthologs
Databases	NCBI: entry; OMA: entry
Species	Human	Mouse
Entrez	57496	239719
Ensembl	ENSG00000186260	ENSMUSG00000009569
UniProt	Q9ULH7	P59759
RefSeq (mRNA)	NM_001308142; NM_014048	NM_001122667; NM_153588; NM_181860
RefSeq (protein)	NP_001295071; NP_054767; NP_001352340; NP_001352341; NP_001352342 NP_001352343; NP_001352344; NP_001352345; NP_001352346; NP_001352347; NP_001352348; NP_001352349; NP_001352350	NP_001116139; NP_705816; NP_862908
Location (UCSC)	Chr 16: 14.07 – 14.27 Mb	Chr 16: 13.07 – 13.24 Mb
PubMed search
- Wikidata
View/Edit Human	View/Edit Mouse

Myocardin-related transcription factor B is a protein that in humans is encoded by the MRTFB gene (previously MKL2).

Members of the myocardin family bind to the transcription factor serum response factor (SRF) and act as coactivators controlling genes of relevance for myogenic differentiation, motile function and addiction.

== See also ==
- MRTFA
