= ELK4 =

Protein-coding gene in humans

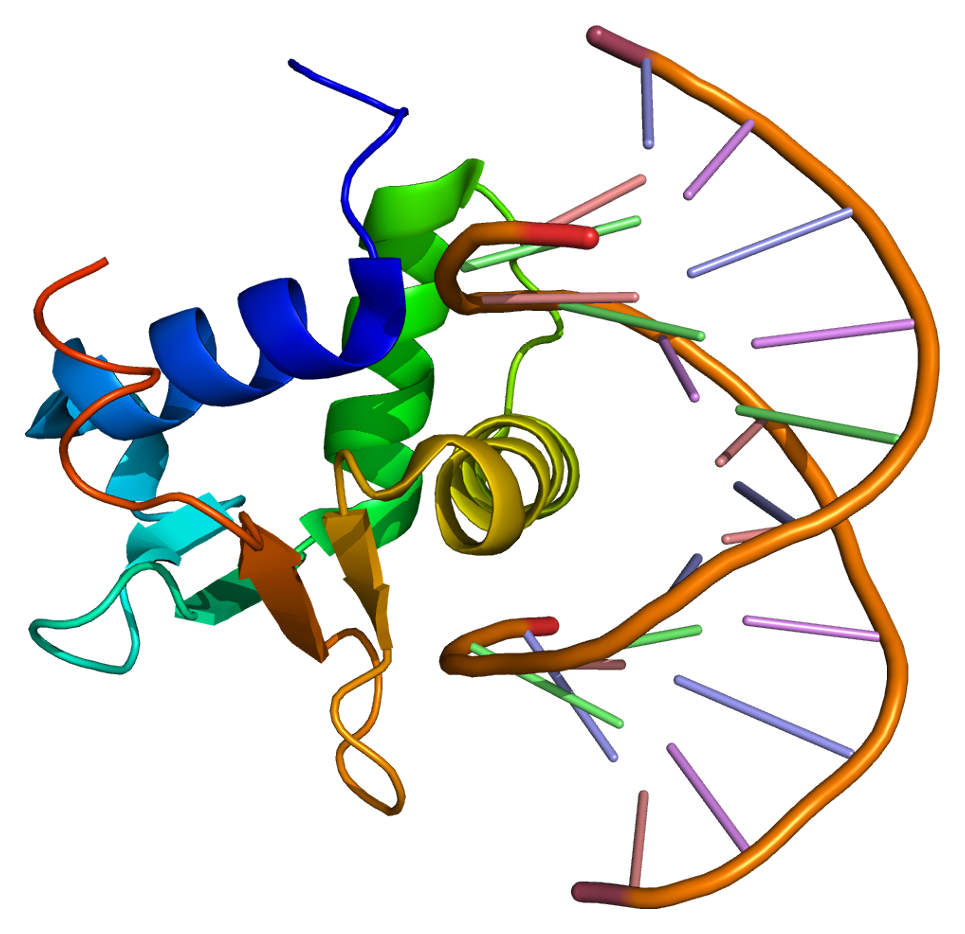

Identifiers
- Aliases: ELK4, SAP1, ETS transcription factor, ETS transcription factor ELK4
- External IDs: OMIM: 600246; MGI: 102853; GeneCards: ELK4
Available structures
PDB	Ortholog search: PDBe RCSB
PDB	List of PDB id codes 1BC7, 1BC8, 1HBX, 1K6O

Gene location (Human)
Chr.	Chromosome 1 (human)
Band	1q32.1	Start	205,597,556 bp
Band	1q32.1	End	205,632,011 bp

Gene location (Mouse)
Chr.	Chromosome 1 (mouse)
Band	1|1 E4	Start	131,935,345 bp
Band	1|1 E4	End	131,960,350 bp
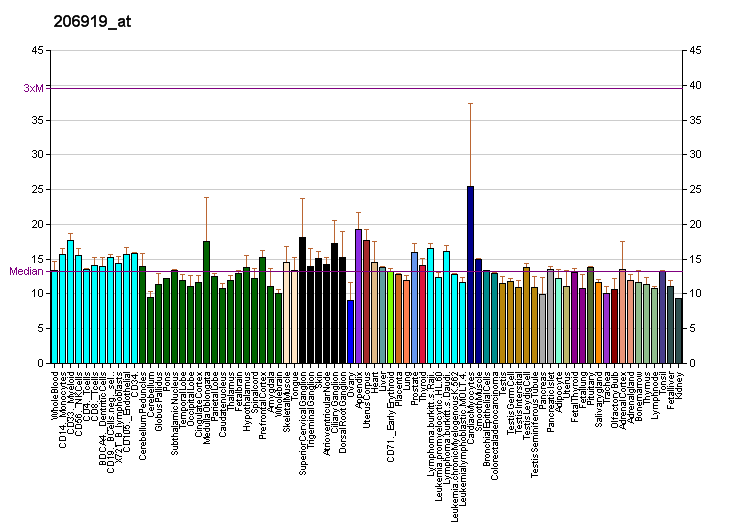

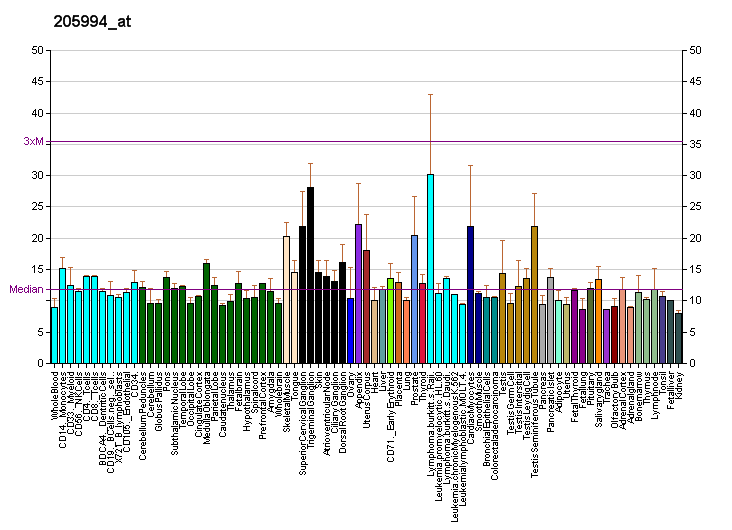

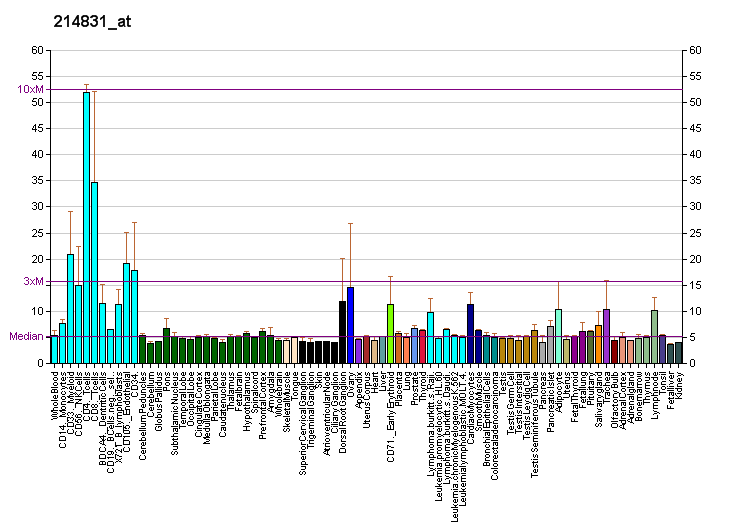
RNA expression pattern
Bgee	Human / Mouse (ortholog); Top expressed in: tendon of biceps brachii; epithelium of colon; sperm; epithelium of nasopharynx; skin of thigh; skin of hip; biceps brachii; superficial temporal artery; parietal pleura; seminal vesicula / Top expressed in: saccule; Paneth cell; otic placode; semi-lunar valve; hair follicle; aortic valve; blood; conjunctival fornix; thymus; ankle; More reference expression data
BioGPS	More reference expression data
Gene ontology
Molecular function	DNA-binding transcription factor activity; DNA binding; sequence-specific DNA binding; chromatin binding; transcription coregulator activity; protein binding; RNA polymerase II cis-regulatory region sequence-specific DNA binding; DNA-binding transcription activator activity, RNA polymerase II-specific; DNA-binding transcription factor activity, RNA polymerase II-specific
Cellular component	nucleoplasm; nucleus; cytosol
Biological process	histone H3 deacetylation; cell differentiation; regulation of transcription, DNA-templated; negative regulation of transcription by RNA polymerase II; transcription, DNA-templated; transcription by RNA polymerase II; positive regulation of transcription by RNA polymerase II; regulation of transcription by RNA polymerase II
Sources:Amigo / QuickGO
Orthologs
Databases	NCBI: entry; OMA: entry
Species	Human	Mouse
Entrez	2005	13714
Ensembl	ENSG00000158711	ENSMUSG00000026436
UniProt	P28324	P41158
RefSeq (mRNA)	NM_001973; NM_021795	NM_007923; NM_001376954; NM_001376955; NM_001376956; NM_001376957 NM_001376958; NM_001376959
RefSeq (protein)	NP_001964; NP_068567; NP_068567.1	NP_031949; NP_001363883; NP_001363884; NP_001363885; NP_001363886 NP_001363887; NP_001363888
Location (UCSC)	Chr 1: 205.6 – 205.63 Mb	Chr 1: 131.94 – 131.96 Mb
PubMed search
- Wikidata
View/Edit Human	View/Edit Mouse

ETS domain-containing protein Elk-4 is a protein that in humans is encoded by the ELK4 gene.

== Function ==
This gene is a member of the Ets family of transcription factors and of the ternary complex factor (TCF) subfamily. Proteins of the TCF subfamily form a ternary complex by binding to the serum response factor and the serum response element in the promoter of the c-fos proto-oncogene. The protein encoded by this gene is phosphorylated by the kinases, MAPK1 and MAPK8. Several transcript variants have been described for this gene.

== Interactions ==
ELK4 has been shown to interact with:

- BRCA1, and
- Serum response factor
