= Serum response factor =

Mammalian protein found in Homo sapiens

SRF
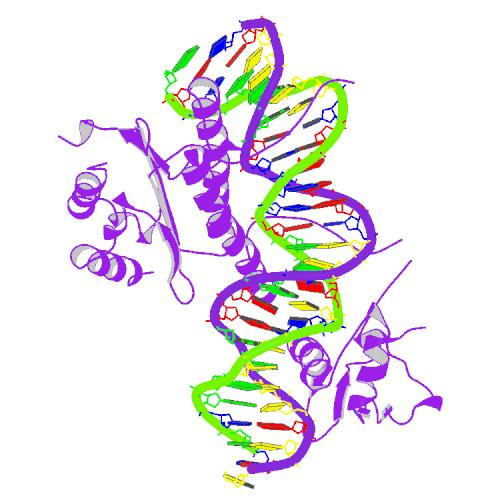

Identifiers
- Aliases: SRF, MCM1, serum response factor
- External IDs: OMIM: 600589; MGI: 106658; GeneCards: SRF
Available structures
PDB	Ortholog search: PDBe RCSB
PDB	List of PDB id codes 1HBX, 1K6O, 1SRS

Gene location (Human)
Chr.	Chromosome 6 (human)
Band	6p21.1	Start	43,171,269 bp
Band	6p21.1	End	43,181,506 bp

Gene location (Mouse)
Chr.	Chromosome 17 (mouse)
Band	17|17 C	Start	46,859,255 bp
Band	17|17 C	End	46,867,101 bp
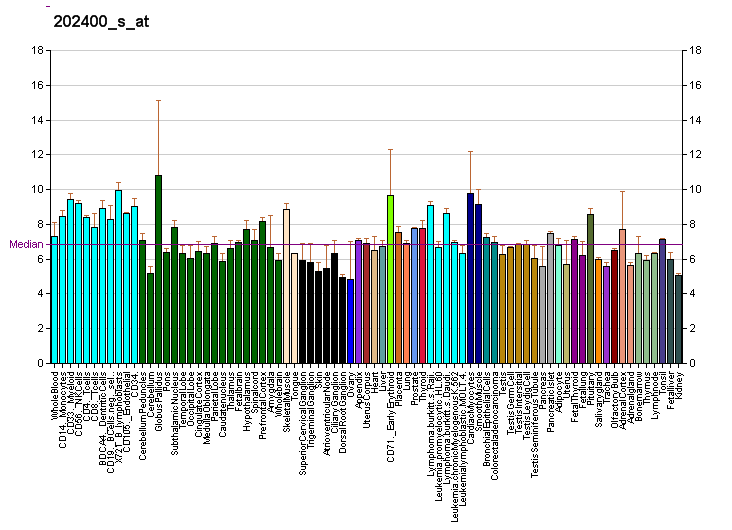

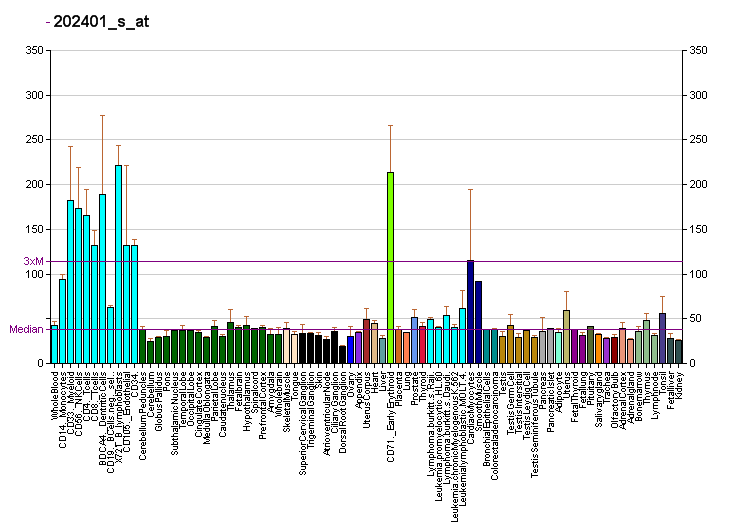
RNA expression pattern
Bgee	Human / Mouse (ortholog); Top expressed in: muscle layer of sigmoid colon; left uterine tube; popliteal artery; tibial arteries; right coronary artery; saphenous vein; body of uterus; right auricle of heart; gastric mucosa; thoracic aorta / Top expressed in: tail of embryo; genital tubercle; zygote; muscle of thigh; lip; superior frontal gyrus; granulocyte; primary visual cortex; dentate gyrus of hippocampal formation granule cell; skeletal muscle tissue; More reference expression data
BioGPS	More reference expression data
Gene ontology
Molecular function	protein dimerization activity; DNA-binding transcription factor activity; DNA-binding transcription activator activity, RNA polymerase II-specific; RNA polymerase II general transcription initiation factor activity; primary miRNA binding; transcription factor binding; RNA polymerase II cis-regulatory region sequence-specific DNA binding; protein homodimerization activity; serum response element binding; chromatin binding; protein binding; DNA binding; sequence-specific DNA binding; transcription factor activity, RNA polymerase II distal enhancer sequence-specific binding; chromatin DNA binding; transcription factor activity, RNA polymerase II core promoter proximal region sequence-specific binding; cis-regulatory region sequence-specific DNA binding; DNA-binding transcription factor activity, RNA polymerase II-specific; histone deacetylase binding; RNA polymerase II-specific DNA-binding transcription factor binding
Cellular component	cytoplasm; nucleus; nucleoplasm
Biological process	dorsal aorta morphogenesis; bronchus cartilage development; muscle cell cellular homeostasis; lung smooth muscle development; regulation of water loss via skin; transcription by RNA polymerase II; stress fiber assembly; cell migration involved in sprouting angiogenesis; platelet activation; cardiac myofibril assembly; heart looping; cellular senescence; face development; regulation of cell adhesion; long-term depression; neuron projection development; morphogenesis of an epithelial sheet; positive regulation of filopodium assembly; primitive streak formation; cellular response to glucose stimulus; negative regulation of cell population proliferation; response to cytokine; regulation of transcription, DNA-templated; heart trabecula formation; actin filament organization; thymus development; angiogenesis involved in wound healing; platelet formation; neuron development; in utero embryonic development; transcription, DNA-templated; positive regulation of transcription, DNA-templated; development of the heart; positive regulation of cell differentiation; branching involved in blood vessel morphogenesis; positive regulation of axon extension; positive regulation of smooth muscle contraction; trachea cartilage development; response to toxic substance; positive regulation of pri-miRNA transcription by RNA polymerase II; positive regulation of transcription by glucose; regulation of smooth muscle cell differentiation; epithelial structure maintenance; associative learning; skin morphogenesis; positive regulation of DNA-binding transcription factor activity; epithelial cell-cell adhesion; neuron migration; positive regulation of transcription initiation from RNA polymerase II promoter; eyelid development in camera-type eye; thyroid gland development; negative regulation of amyloid-beta clearance; negative regulation of cell migration; developmental growth; hematopoietic stem cell differentiation; gastrulation; trophectodermal cell differentiation; positive thymic T cell selection; response to hormone; cell-matrix adhesion; sarcomere organization; actin cytoskeleton organization; megakaryocyte development; response to hypoxia; lung morphogenesis; mesoderm formation; cardiac vascular smooth muscle cell differentiation; mRNA transcription by RNA polymerase II; multicellular organism development; tangential migration from the subventricular zone to the olfactory bulb; long-term memory; contractile actin filament bundle assembly; bicellular tight junction assembly; leukocyte differentiation; hippocampus development; positive regulation of transcription by RNA polymerase II; erythrocyte development; negative regulation of pri-miRNA transcription by RNA polymerase II; forebrain development; cell-cell adhesion
Sources:Amigo / QuickGO
Orthologs
Databases	NCBI: entry; OMA: entry
Species	Human	Mouse
Entrez	6722	20807
Ensembl	ENSG00000112658	ENSMUSG00000015605
UniProt	P11831	Q9JM73
RefSeq (mRNA)	NM_003131; NM_001292001	NM_020493
RefSeq (protein)	NP_001278930; NP_003122; NP_003122.1	NP_065239
Location (UCSC)	Chr 6: 43.17 – 43.18 Mb	Chr 17: 46.86 – 46.87 Mb
PubMed search
- Wikidata
View/Edit Human	View/Edit Mouse

Serum response factor, also known as SRF, is a transcription factor protein.

== Function ==
Serum response factor is a member of the MADS (MCM1, Agamous, Deficiens, and SRF) box superfamily of transcription factors. This protein binds to the serum response element (SRE) in the promoter region of target genes. This protein regulates the activity of many immediate early genes, for example c-fos, and thereby participates in cell cycle regulation, apoptosis, cell growth, and cell differentiation. This gene is the downstream target of many pathways; for example, the mitogen-activated protein kinase pathway (MAPK) that acts through the ternary complex factors (TCFs).

SRF is important during the development of the embryo, as it has been linked to the formation of mesoderm. In the fully developed mammal, SRF is crucial for the growth of skeletal muscle. Interaction of SRF with other proteins, such as steroid hormone receptors, may contribute to regulation of muscle growth by steroids. Interaction of SRF with other proteins such as myocardin or Elk-1 may enhance or suppress expression of genes important for growth of vascular smooth muscle.

== Clinical significance ==
Lack of skin SRF is associated with psoriasis and other skin diseases.

== Interactions ==
Serum response factor has been shown to interact with:

- ASCC3,
- ATF6,
- CEBPB,
- CREB-binding protein,
- ELK4,
- GATA4,
- GTF2F1,
- GTF2I,
- Myogenin,
- NFYA,
- Nuclear receptor co-repressor 2,
- Promyelocytic leukemia protein and
- Src, and
- TEAD1.

== See also ==
- MKL1
- Nuclear actin functions
