= XPO4 =

Protein-coding gene in the species Homo sapiens

Identifiers
- Aliases: XPO4, exp4, exportin 4
- External IDs: OMIM: 611449; MGI: 1888526; GeneCards: XPO4

Gene location (Human)
Chr.	Chromosome 13 (human)
Band	13q12.11	Start	20,777,329 bp
Band	13q12.11	End	20,903,048 bp

Gene location (Mouse)
Chr.	Chromosome 14 (mouse)
Band	14|14 C3	Start	57,577,521 bp
Band	14|14 C3	End	57,665,430 bp
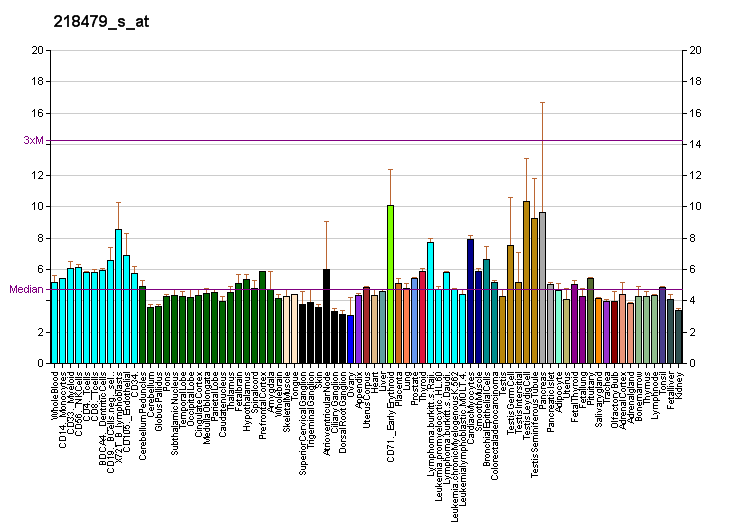
RNA expression pattern
Bgee	Human / Mouse (ortholog); Top expressed in: Skeletal muscle tissue of rectus abdominis; biceps brachii; Skeletal muscle tissue of biceps brachii; secondary oocyte; muscle of thigh; deltoid muscle; testicle; tendon; gastrocnemius muscle; Achilles tendon / Top expressed in: primitive streak; epiblast; maxillary prominence; mandibular prominence; zygote; tail of embryo; Rostral migratory stream; secondary oocyte; hair follicle; hand; More reference expression data
BioGPS	More reference expression data
Gene ontology
Molecular function	nuclear export signal receptor activity; protein binding
Cellular component	nuclear pore; nucleus; nucleoplasm; cytoplasm; cytosol
Biological process	positive regulation of protein export from nucleus; protein transport; nuclear export; protein export from nucleus
Sources:Amigo / QuickGO
Orthologs
Databases	NCBI: entry; OMA: entry
Species	Human	Mouse
Entrez	64328	57258
Ensembl	ENSG00000132953	ENSMUSG00000021952
UniProt	Q9C0E2	Q9ESJ0
RefSeq (mRNA)	NM_022459; NM_001372061	NM_020506
RefSeq (protein)	NP_071904; NP_001358990	NP_065252; NP_001355626; NP_001355627
Location (UCSC)	Chr 13: 20.78 – 20.9 Mb	Chr 14: 57.58 – 57.67 Mb
PubMed search
- Wikidata
View/Edit Human	View/Edit Mouse

Exportin-4 is a protein that in humans is encoded by the XPO4 gene.

== See also ==
- Chromosome 13 (human)
- Protein transport
- Ran (gene)
- SMAD3
