= Myocardin =

Protein-coding gene in the species Homo sapiens

MYOCD

Identifiers
- Aliases: MYOCD, MYCD, myocardin, MGBL
- External IDs: OMIM: 606127; MGI: 2137495; GeneCards: MYOCD

Gene location (Human)
Chr.	Chromosome 17 (human)
Band	17p12	Start	12,665,890 bp
Band	17p12	End	12,768,949 bp

Gene location (Mouse)
Chr.	Chromosome 11 (mouse)
Band	11|11 B3	Start	65,067,387 bp
Band	11|11 B3	End	65,160,815 bp
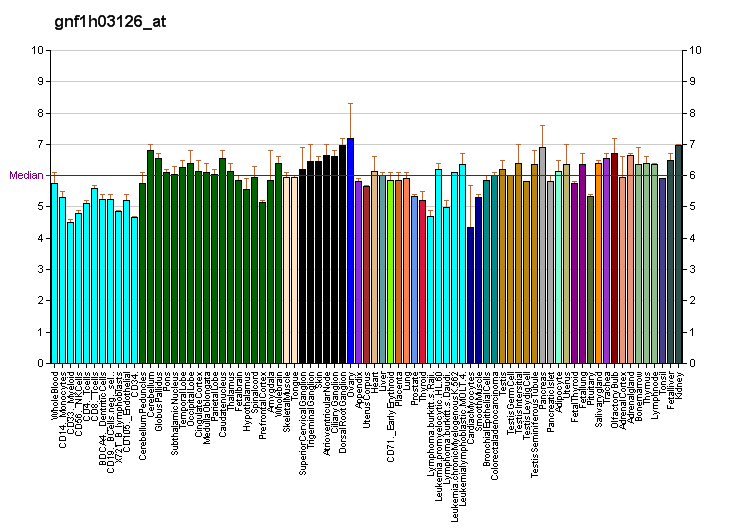
RNA expression pattern
Bgee	Human / Mouse (ortholog); Top expressed in: tail of epididymis; saphenous vein; cardiac muscle tissue of right atrium; right ventricle; nipple; urethra; right coronary artery; superficial temporal artery; ascending aorta; smooth muscle tissue / Top expressed in: ascending aorta; aortic valve; tunica media of zone of aorta; umbilical cord; myocardium of ventricle; interventricular septum; atrium; vas deferens; migratory enteric neural crest cell; cumulus cell; More reference expression data
BioGPS	More reference expression data
Gene ontology
Molecular function	transcription coactivator activity; R-SMAD binding; DNA-binding transcription activator activity, RNA polymerase II-specific; transcription factor binding; histone deacetylase binding; core promoter sequence-specific DNA binding; protein binding; histone acetyltransferase binding; cis-regulatory region sequence-specific DNA binding; RNA polymerase II-specific DNA-binding transcription factor binding; RNA polymerase II cis-regulatory region sequence-specific DNA binding
Cellular component	nucleus
Biological process	cellular component maintenance; positive regulation of transforming growth factor beta receptor signaling pathway; response to hypoxia; regulation of transcription, DNA-templated; negative regulation of cyclin-dependent protein serine/threonine kinase activity; urinary bladder development; regulation of transcription by RNA polymerase II; vascular associated smooth muscle cell differentiation; cardiac ventricle development; regulation of cell growth by extracellular stimulus; positive regulation of DNA-binding transcription factor activity; negative regulation of transcription by RNA polymerase II; smooth muscle cell differentiation; transcription, DNA-templated; regulation of phenotypic switching; vasculogenesis; positive regulation of transcription, DNA-templated; uterus development; negative regulation of skeletal muscle cell differentiation; negative regulation of cardiac muscle cell apoptotic process; development of the heart; muscle cell differentiation; negative regulation of amyloid-beta clearance; positive regulation of smooth muscle cell differentiation; regulation of myoblast differentiation; regulation of histone acetylation; positive regulation of cell population proliferation; negative regulation of myotube differentiation; positive regulation of transcription from RNA polymerase II promoter involved in smooth muscle cell differentiation; positive regulation of cardiac vascular smooth muscle cell differentiation; positive regulation of cardiac muscle cell differentiation; ventricular cardiac muscle cell differentiation; positive regulation of DNA binding; lung alveolus development; digestive tract development; positive regulation of smooth muscle contraction; cardiocyte differentiation; ductus arteriosus closure; positive regulation of transcription by RNA polymerase II; negative regulation of cell population proliferation; regulation of smooth muscle cell differentiation; transcription by RNA polymerase II; cardiac muscle cell differentiation; positive regulation of gene expression; negative regulation of vascular associated smooth muscle cell proliferation; negative regulation of vascular associated smooth muscle cell migration; negative regulation of platelet-derived growth factor receptor-beta signaling pathway
Sources:Amigo / QuickGO
Orthologs
Databases	NCBI: entry; OMA: entry
Species	Human	Mouse
Entrez	93649	214384
Ensembl	ENSG00000141052	ENSMUSG00000020542
UniProt	Q8IZQ8	Q8VIM5
RefSeq (mRNA)	NM_001146312; NM_001146313; NM_153604; NM_001378306	NM_145136; NM_146386
RefSeq (protein)	NP_001139784; NP_705832; NP_001365235	NP_660118; NP_666498
Location (UCSC)	Chr 17: 12.67 – 12.77 Mb	Chr 11: 65.07 – 65.16 Mb
PubMed search
- Wikidata
View/Edit Human	View/Edit Mouse

Myocardin is a protein that in humans is encoded by the MYOCD gene.

Myocardin is a smooth muscle cell and cardiac muscle cell-specific transcriptional coactivator of serum response factor (SRF). When expressed in smooth muscle precursor cells and abnormally in nonmuscle cells, myocardin can induce smooth muscle cell differentiation. Myocardin can also function in the differentiation of myocardial cells.

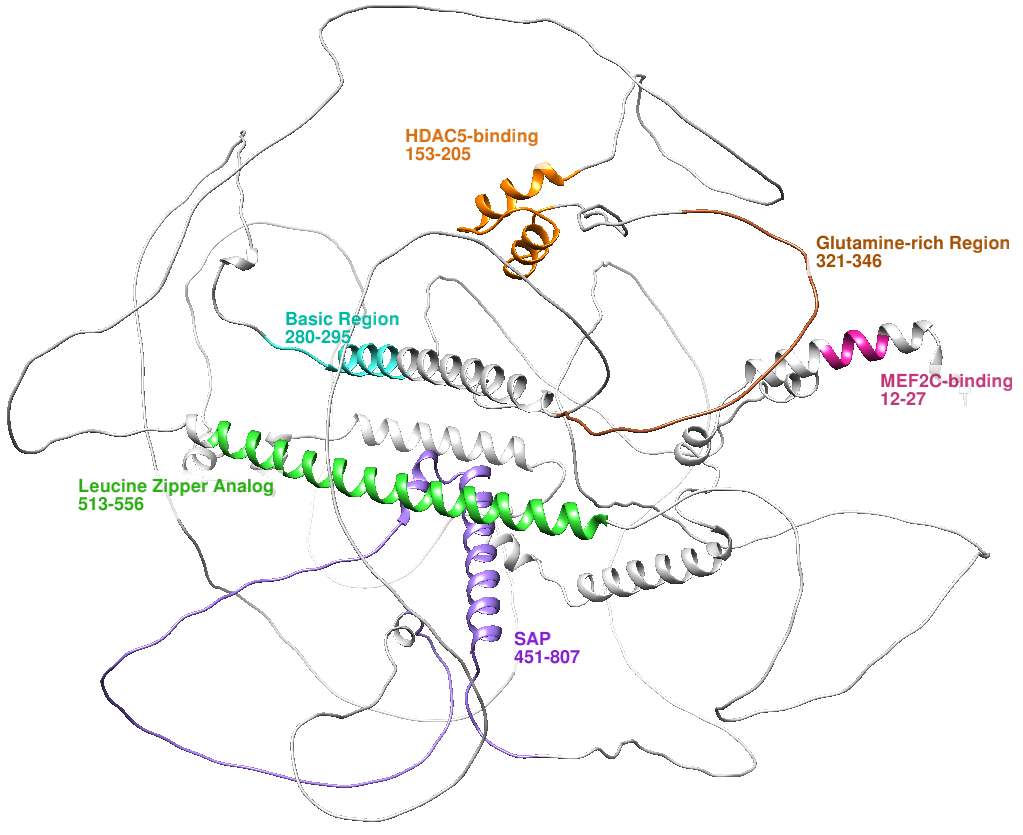
The SAP DNA-binding domain is shown in purple and spans amino acids 541–807. The basic region, in turquoise, spans amino acids 280-295. The glutamine-rich region, in brown, spans amino acids 321-346. The leucine zipper analog, shown in green, spans amino acids 513-556. Domains for binding of protein partners, MEF2C and HCAC5, are shown in magenta (spanning amino acids 12-27) and orange (spanning amino acids 153-205), respectively.

== Structure ==
Myocardin consists of four distinct regions, one of which is the SAF-A/B, Acinus, and PIAS (SAP) domain. SAP domains are highly conserved motifs containing alpha helices that generally contain hydrophobic, polar, and bulky amino acids.

Myocardin also contains a basic region and a glutamine-rich region believed to be involved in binding SRF.

Through a series of deletion mutations, researchers have also identified a dimerization motif spanning amino acid residues 513–713, containing an alpha helical leucine zipper analog between residues 513-556.

== Function ==
Myocardin is a transcriptional coactivator, enhancing the activity of specific genes involved in smooth muscle development and function by interacting with transcription factor, SRF. Myocardin can induce smooth muscle cell differentiation when it is expressed in appropriate cells. Researchers have also found that myocardin plays a role in myocardial cell differentiation by inhibiting myocardin in Xenopus embryos.

Amino acid residues 541–807 of myocardin are believed to play a key role in mediating its ability to activate transcription. Upon its initial discovery, researchers fused myocardin with the well studied GAL 4 transcription factor and examined how the regulation of GAL4-associated genes was affected. Myocardin is believed to activate transcription by binding to CArG box regions of DNA, characterized by the sequence CC(A/T)_{6}GG, of muscle function genes, because mutations to these regions have led to an observed reduction in their sensitivity to myocardin.

Myocardin contributes to the expression of cardiac muscle cell differentiation by interacting with myocyte enhancer factor 2 (MEF2) or SRF, enhancing their transcriptional activity. Conversely, in smooth muscle cells, myocardin associates with the transcriptional coactivator, p300, stimulating acetylation and consequent expression of smooth muscle cell genes, as well as acetylation of myocardin itself. Class II HDAC proteins are responsible for histone deacetylation, and have been found to inhibit the activity of myocardin.

== Gene ==
There are four known transcript variants (isoforms) of the MYOCD gene. While the exact function of each isoform is not well understood, it is suggested that each variant may have tissue-specific functions. Real-time polymerase chain reaction (RT-PCR) have realved two tissue-specific isoforms, myocardin-856, expressed in smooth muscle and found to interact with SRF, and myocardin-935, expressed in cardiac muscle and found to interact with either MEF2 or SRF.

Expression of MYOCD is specifically observed in the cardaic and smooth muscle tissues, such as the arteries, female reproductive organs and colon. Expression is also observed in the heart, aorta, and bladder, tissues in which smooth muscle can be found.
