= E74 like ETS transcription factor 3 =

Protein found in humans

ELF3

Identifiers
- Aliases: ELF3, EPR-1, ERT, ESE-1, ESX, E74 like ETS transcription factor 3
- External IDs: OMIM: 602191; MGI: 1101781; GeneCards: ELF3
Available structures
PDB	Ortholog search: PDBe RCSB
PDB	List of PDB id codes 2E8P

Gene location (Human)
Chr.	Chromosome 1 (human)
Band	1q32.1	Start	202,007,945 bp
Band	1q32.1	End	202,017,183 bp

Gene location (Mouse)
Chr.	Chromosome 1 (mouse)
Band	1|1 E4	Start	135,181,313 bp
Band	1|1 E4	End	135,186,306 bp
RNA expression pattern
Bgee	Human / Mouse (ortholog); Top expressed in: olfactory zone of nasal mucosa; mucosa of transverse colon; rectum; pancreatic ductal cell; gallbladder; body of pancreas; minor salivary glands; islet of Langerhans; right uterine tube; palpebral conjunctiva / Top expressed in: corneal stroma; pyloric antrum; epithelium of stomach; mucous cell of stomach; blastocyst; duodenum; colon; left colon; medulla of thymus; crypt of lieberkuhn of small intestine; More reference expression data
BioGPS	n/a
Gene ontology
Molecular function	DNA binding; sequence-specific DNA binding; DNA-binding transcription factor activity; transcription coactivator activity; DNA-binding transcription activator activity, RNA polymerase II-specific; RNA polymerase II cis-regulatory region sequence-specific DNA binding; protein binding; DNA-binding transcription factor activity, RNA polymerase II-specific
Cellular component	cytoplasm; nucleus; Golgi apparatus; cytosol; nucleoplasm
Biological process	cell differentiation; regulation of transcription, DNA-templated; epithelial cell differentiation; regulation of transcription by RNA polymerase II; anatomical structure morphogenesis; extracellular matrix organization; transcription by RNA polymerase II; transcription, DNA-templated; multicellular organism development; positive regulation of transcription, DNA-templated; epidermis development; inflammatory response; negative regulation of transcription, DNA-templated; blastocyst development; positive regulation of transcription by RNA polymerase II; mammary gland involution; positive regulation of Notch signaling pathway
Sources:Amigo / QuickGO
Orthologs
Databases	NCBI: entry; OMA: entry
Species	Human	Mouse
Entrez	1999	13710
Ensembl	ENSG00000163435	ENSMUSG00000003051
UniProt	P78545	Q3UPW2
RefSeq (mRNA)	NM_001114309; NM_004433	NM_001163131; NM_007921
RefSeq (protein)	NP_001107781; NP_004424	NP_001156603; NP_031947
Location (UCSC)	Chr 1: 202.01 – 202.02 Mb	Chr 1: 135.18 – 135.19 Mb
PubMed search
- Wikidata
View/Edit Human	View/Edit Mouse

ETS-related transcription factor Elf-3 is a protein that in humans is encoded by the ELF3 gene. It is a member of the ETS transcription factor family and was named for its homology to E74, a transcription factor from Drosophila melanogaster.
