= Lymphoid leucosis =

Viral disease of chickens

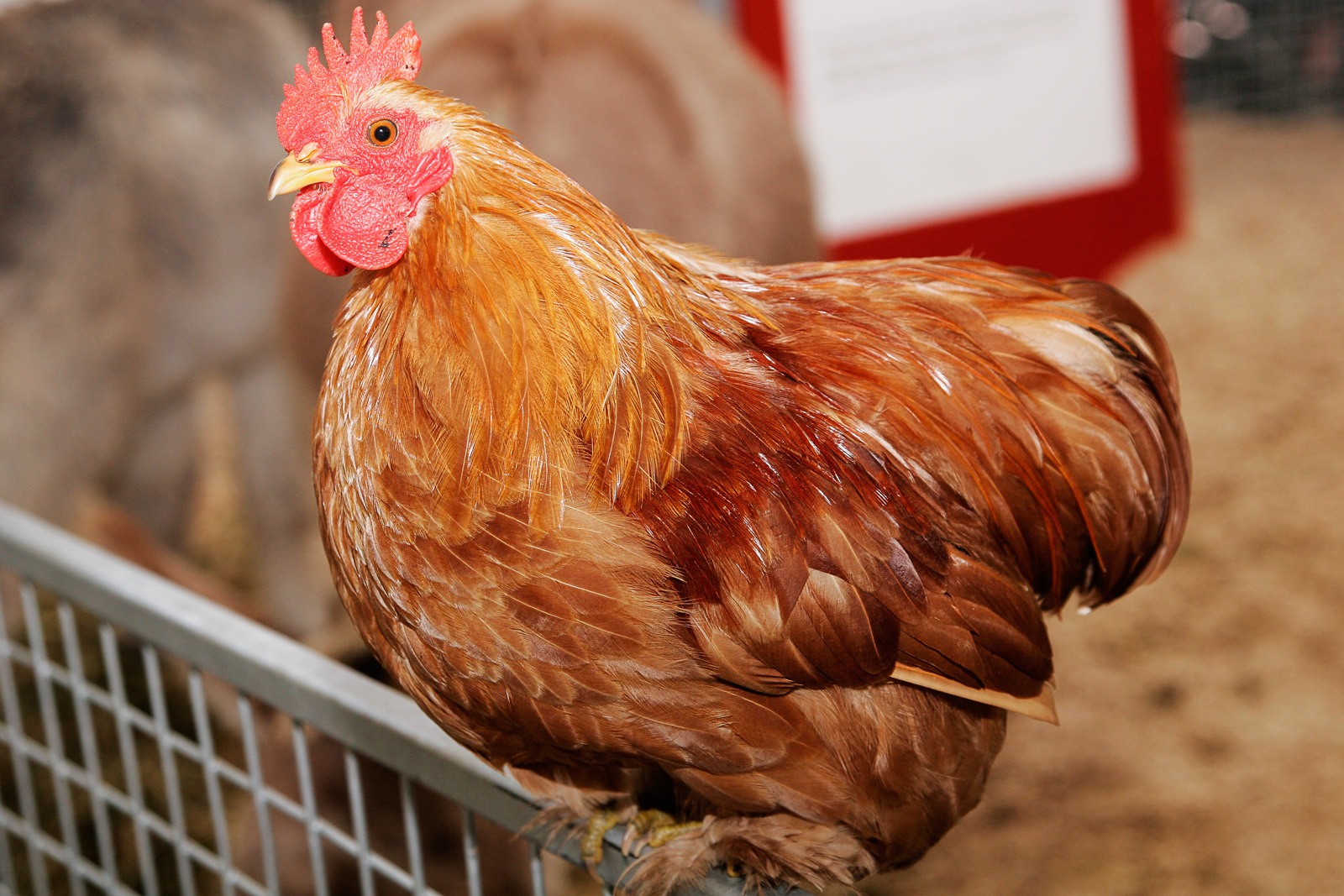
A healthy chicken

Lymphoid leucosis is a disease that affects chickens, caused by the retrovirus Avian leukosis virus.

It is a neoplastic disease caused by a virus, which may take the form of a tumor of the bursa of Fabricius and may metastasize to other tissues of the chicken and cause enlargement and swelling of the abdomen.

== Symptoms ==
Symptoms include enlargement of abdomen, bursa, weight loss, weakness and emaciation, and depression. The disease is more likely to affect chicken around five to eight months of age who are more vulnerable. Green diarrhea tends to develops at the terminal stage.
