= Sporadic bovine lymphosarcoma =

Cancer of cattle

Sporadic bovine lymphosarcoma (SBL) is a rare type of cancer seen in cattle, characterized by the overgrowth of lymphoid tissue. It was first described in 1871 in Lithuania in a cow suffering from lymph node hypertrophy and splenomegaly. No specific causative agent has yet been discovered, as the disease appears to occur sporadically in cattle population, as the name suggests. This condition can manifest itself in three different forms: juvenile form (calf/multicentric lymphosarcoma), thymic form (thymic lymphosarcoma) and skin (cutaneous lymphoma). Although very similar in pathology to enzootic bovine leukosis, sporadic bovine lymphosarcoma is not related to infection from the retrovirus bovine leukemia virus (BLV). Bovine leukosis caused by bovine leukemia virus occurs frequently in adult cattle population, whereas sporadic bovine leukosis appears to affect only younger cattle. All forms of SBL are rare and are typically seen in cattle less than 2 years of age. Most commonly, B-cell lymphomas are seen as a result of bovine leukemia virus infection whereas tumor cells of sporadic lymphomas are all immature lineage of T-cells and less commonly B-cells. Previous findings have shown that the proto-oncogene C-Myb is expressed in most sporadic lymphomas but not in enzootic leukosis. These alterations to small sets of cellular genes appear to contribute significantly to the neoplastic transformation of cells, notably leukocytes and lymphocytes in this disease. All forms of sporadic bovine lymphosarcoma may have varying clinical presentation related to the affected organs.

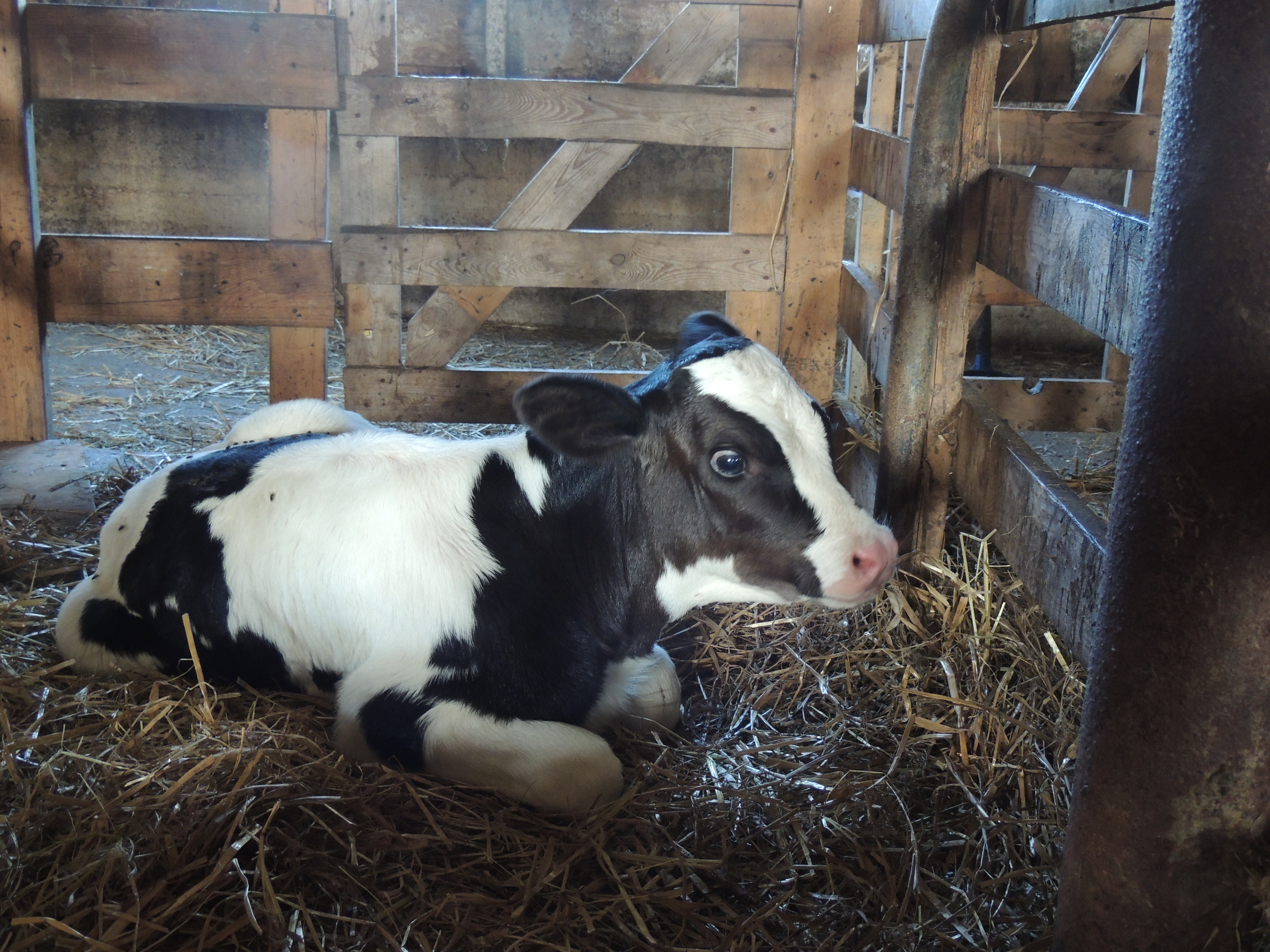
Young holstein heifer within the age range of developing the juvenile form of lymphosarcoma.

== Juvenile lymphosarcoma ==
Juvenile or calf lymphosarcoma is typically seen in neonatal calves and cattle up to 18 months of age. Neonates are most commonly affected by the B-cell form of calf lymphosarcoma but the reasons and mechanisms around this remain unknown. Both the T-cell and B-cell form induce a diffuse lymphadenopathy causing palpable enlargement of peripheral lymph nodes in affected calves. Out of all of the dairy breeds, it appears that the milking shorthorn has the highest incidence of juvenile/calf lymphosarcoma, making researchers question the genetic implication of this disease.

=== Clinical signs of juvenile lymphosarcoma ===
Juvenile lymphosarcoma can be characterized by a progressive weight loss and generalized peripheral lymphadenopathy, in addition to a diffuse lymphoid hyperplasia. Clinical signs will vary significantly depending on what organs have been affected. Upon examination, increased heart and respiratory rate along with bronchial sounds are often noticed. Additionally, fevers, tachycardia, dyspnea, bloat, diarrhea and hind limb ataxia (or posterior paresis) were also reported. Posterior ataxia was found to be caused by the formation of tumors near the spinal cord, causing a compression in the lumbar area. Animals with juvenile lymphosarcoma usually perish within 4 to 6 weeks following the onset of clinical sign.

=== Diagnosis of juvenile lymphosarcoma ===
The hematological parameters observed in cows affected with SBL are variable. Most commonly, calves will have a high incidence of circulating immature lymphocytes and roughly 50% will be leukemic. Complete blood counts (CBC) can show both leukocytosis (>17,000/mL) and lymphocytosis (>10,800/mL), in addition to normocytic and normochromic anemia (<28% PCV). Blood serum biochemical testing often shows increased activity of gamma-glutamyltransferase (GGT > 23 U/L) secondary to neoplastic infiltration of hepatic tissue. Also hypophosphatemia (<5.9 mg/dL) and hypomagnesemia (<1.9 mg/dL) can occur as a result of anorexia. Bone marrow biopsy may reveal neoplastic lymphocytes and a macrocytic anemia. In most cases, blood biochemistry will appear normal, yet some cases may show decreased globulins and increased albumin, causing an imbalanced A/G ratio. The presence of neoplastic cells within the medullary cavity of the bone has eroding consequences on the cortical bone and fat. This condition can lead to marrow embolism, peripheral blood cutopenias, pathologic fracture, and necrosis of medually bone and bone marrow elements. Similar to enzootic bovine leukosis, enlarged lymph nodes and infiltration of neoplastic lymphocytes within the spleen, liver, bone marrow and sometimes within the body of the lumbar vertebrae and the spinal cord will be observed at post mortem. In calves between the age of 4 and 7 months, development of visceral tumours, bone marrow lesions and peripheral leukemia have also been reported.

== Thymic lymphosarcoma ==
The thymic form of sporadic lymphosarcoma is an aggressively invasive malignant tumour which appears in cattle between the age of 6 and 24 months of age, although it has been reported in 30-month-old cattle. Secondary to the findings of Ogawa (et al. 1986) on the involvement of the proto-oncogene C-myb, it was suggested by Oliver-Espinosa et al. (1994) that the thymic form may be hereditary, secondary to the transfer of these mutated genes. The lymphosarcoma appears, or begins its rapid growth in the thymus, where it may then affect to a lesser extent lymph nodes and other organs such as the liver, spleen, kidney and lungs. This form may involve the cervical and/or intrathoracic thymus.

=== Clinical signs of thymic lymphosarcoma ===
The thymic form of sporadic bovine lymphosarcoma is characterised by the progressive enlargement of the thymus. This enlargement frequently remains in the thorax, although some cases may develop cervical enlargement as well. As with the other forms of the disease, clinical signs will vary based on the location and size of the tumor(s). Most cases will develop some degree of caudal cervical swelling, which is then able to progress to the mid or cranial-ventral cervical region. Thymic enlargement is the result of infiltration of neoplastic lymphocytes into the thymus organ. Producers will often contact a veterinarian for other complaints such as bloat or dyspnea, which are more noticeable with this disease. As thymic enlargement progresses, it leads to the compression of the esophagus which then interfered with eructation, leading to bloat. In addition, tracheal compression, pulmonary displacement or compression, pleural effusion and pulmonary edema are all resulting from this compression, which leads to signs of dyspnea. This condition may also be confused with diphtheria, a bacterial infection of the larynx. Upon examination, heifers may also present signs of a fever. Muffled heart sounds or reduced air sounds can be common in cases where extremely large thymic masses develop within the thorax or the thoracic inlet, which may distend the jugular vein, often leading to heart failure.

=== Diagnosis of thymic lymphosarcoma ===
Ante mortem diagnostic testing of thymic lymphosarcoma includes analysis of synovial fluid taken from the hock joint, which may reveal high lymphocyte numbers with abnormal morphology. Lymph nodes aspirate and biopsies, in addition to thoracocentesis or ultrasound-guided biopsy are also useful tools in diagnosis ante-mortem. Thymic lymphosarcoma can also be confirmed at post-mortem by necropsy and histologic examination. A high occurrence of immature, poorly differentiated lymphocytes would be observable.

== Cutaneous lymphoma ==
The skin form of sporadic bovine leukosis is very rare and is only seen in cattle less than 30 months of age. This form is associated with helper/inducer T-cell origin which resembles Mycosis Fungoindes and Sézary syndrome in humans. Most case reports have been seronegative for BLV, showing the non-relationship between the two diseases. Cutaneous lymphoma is characterized by the presence of cutaneous plaques, which are usually between 1–5 cm in diameter, distributed sporadically throughout the body, with higher concentration on the neck, back, rump and thighs. Some case study have described spontaneous recovery from this form of lymphoma, however, recurrence of the disease is frequent.

=== Clinical signs of cutaneous lymphoma ===
This form of SBL causes multiple skin nodules to form on the neck, trunk and rear quarters of the affected cattle. The disease progresses over the course of a few months, inducing the appearance of larger and more numerous nodules. Some cases also present with pruritus (severe itching of the skin). As this form of bovine lymphosarcoma is particularly rare, knowledge on clinical signs is limited to a few case studies reported in the 1980s. Notably, a case in a 10-month old female Simmental-red Holstein crossbred was published in 1987 and described the cattle as having numerous flattered, firm cutaneous nodules of various size (3-80mm in diameter) distributed over the whole body. Enlargement of inguinal lymph nodes was also noticeable upon necropsy. Further testing revealed extensive infiltration of neoplastic cells into the dermis, superficial subcutis and epidermis. Although it is often limited to regional lymph node, this lymphoma can also involve the spleen, bone marrow, liver, kidney and brain. Cattle affected by this form will often appear healthy during the early stage but show progressive deterioration of health and condition over the next 6–12 months following the onset of clinical signs and will then perish of diffuse neoplasia. Producers should keep in mind that animals infected with this form are highly susceptible to skin infections secondary to insect bites. Superficial dermatitis and skin nodule bleeding secondary to irritation from insects may even lead to abscessation of the lymph nodes.

=== Diagnosis of cutaneous lymphoma ===
Ante-mortem diagnosis of the bovine skin lymphoma relies on biopsies and cytologies collected from effusions or target organs. The presence of neoplastic cells is often a good indicator of this disease, in addition to presence of palpable target organ neoplasia and lymphadenopathy (enlargement of lymph nodes). Post-mortem diagnosis relies on necropsy findings such as enlarged neoplastic organs (liver, spleen, kidney, bone marrow or brain) and histological examinations of infected tissue to examine the presence of neoplastic cells. Usually, analysis of a cell line taken from a cutaneous lymphoma case is enough to determine if the sample is from a t-cell origin.
