= ELF5 =

Protein-coding gene

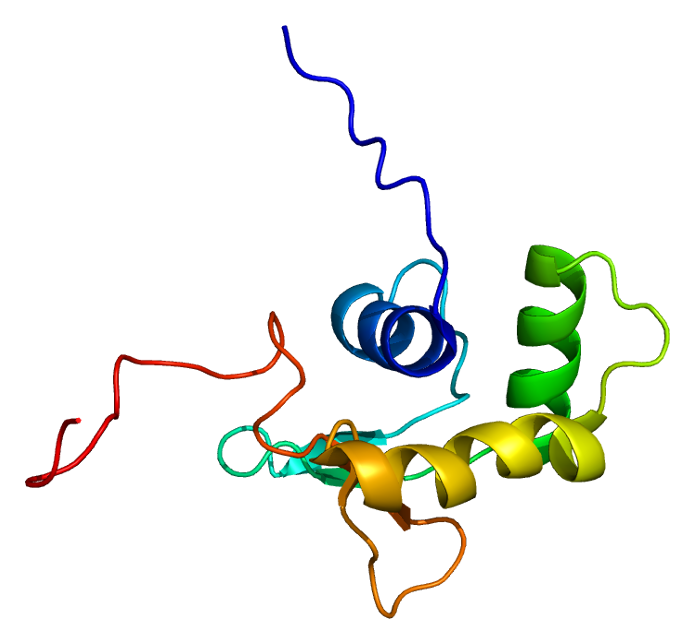

Identifiers
- Aliases: ELF5, ESE2, E74 like ETS transcription factor 5
- External IDs: OMIM: 605169; MGI: 1335079; GeneCards: ELF5
Available structures
PDB	Ortholog search: PDBe RCSB
PDB	List of PDB id codes 1WWX

Gene location (Human)
Chr.	Chromosome 11 (human)
Band	11p13	Start	34,478,791 bp
Band	11p13	End	34,525,193 bp

Gene location (Mouse)
Chr.	Chromosome 2 (mouse)
Band	2|2 E2	Start	103,242,033 bp
Band	2|2 E2	End	103,281,334 bp
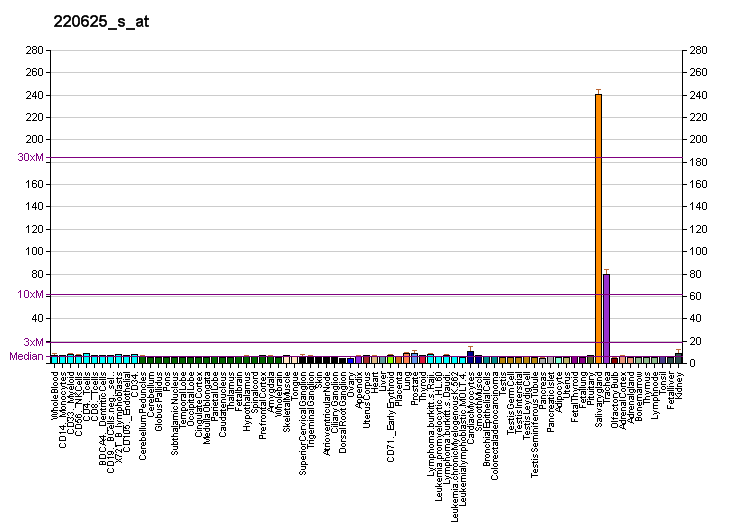

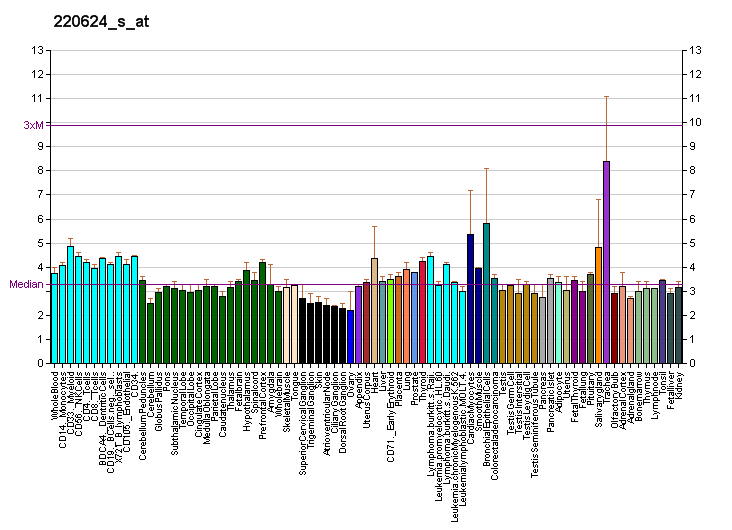
RNA expression pattern
Bgee	Human / Mouse (ortholog); Top expressed in: parotid gland; amniotic fluid; seminal vesicula; epithelium of lactiferous gland; lactiferous duct; minor salivary glands; olfactory zone of nasal mucosa; mucosa of paranasal sinus; buccal mucosa cell; palpebral conjunctiva / Top expressed in: seminal vesicula; parotid gland; lactiferous gland; olfactory epithelium; left lung lobe; submandibular gland; lacrimal gland; medullary collecting duct; esophagus; lip; More reference expression data
BioGPS	More reference expression data
Gene ontology
Molecular function	DNA-binding transcription activator activity, RNA polymerase II-specific; DNA binding; DNA-binding transcription factor activity; sequence-specific DNA binding; RNA polymerase II transcription regulatory region sequence-specific DNA binding; DNA-binding transcription factor activity, RNA polymerase II-specific
Cellular component	cytoplasm; nucleus
Biological process	regulation of transcription by RNA polymerase II; ectodermal cell fate commitment; negative regulation of cell differentiation; cell differentiation; ectoderm development; cell population proliferation; regulation of transcription, DNA-templated; somatic stem cell population maintenance; transcription, DNA-templated; positive regulation of transcription by RNA polymerase II; mammary gland epithelial cell differentiation; transcription by RNA polymerase II
Sources:Amigo / QuickGO
Orthologs
Databases	NCBI: entry; OMA: entry
Species	Human	Mouse
Entrez	2001	13711
Ensembl	ENSG00000135374	ENSMUSG00000027186
UniProt	Q9UKW6	Q8VDK3
RefSeq (mRNA)	NM_198381; NM_001243080; NM_001243081; NM_001422	NM_001145813; NM_010125
RefSeq (protein)	NP_001230009; NP_001230010; NP_001413; NP_938195	NP_001139285; NP_034255
Location (UCSC)	Chr 11: 34.48 – 34.53 Mb	Chr 2: 103.24 – 103.28 Mb
PubMed search
- Wikidata
View/Edit Human	View/Edit Mouse

E74-like factor 5 (ets domain transcription factor), is a gene found in both mice and humans. In humans it is also called ESE2.

== Function ==
The protein encoded by this gene is a member of an epithelium-specific subclass of the ETS transcription factor family. In addition to its role in regulating the later stages of terminal differentiation of keratinocytes, it appears to regulate a number of epithelium-specific genes found in tissues containing glandular epithelium such as salivary gland and prostate. It has very low affinity to DNA due to its negative regulatory domain at the amino terminus. Two alternatively spliced transcript variants encoding different isoforms have been described for this gene.

== Relevance to Disease ==
A role in breast or prostate cancer is known. There are preliminary reports that the C allele genetic variant of rs61882275 near chromosome location 11.13 with variable incidence in human populations is associated with severe COVID-19. Further investigation by others suggested the association was caused by a tissue-specific effect on ELF5 expression in lung endothelium by this allele which results in a more than 4-fold higher risk of severe COVID-19 in those with SARS-CoV2 infection.
