= ETS variant 3 =

Protein found in humans

ETV3

Identifiers
- Aliases: ETV3, METS, PE-1, PE1, bA110J1.4, ETS variant 3, ETS variant transcription factor 3
- External IDs: OMIM: 164873; MGI: 1350926; GeneCards: ETV3

Gene location (Human)
Chr.	Chromosome 1 (human)
Band	1q23.1	Start	157,121,191 bp
Band	1q23.1	End	157,138,474 bp

Gene location (Mouse)
Chr.	Chromosome 3 (mouse)
Band	3|3 F1	Start	87,432,714 bp
Band	3|3 F1	End	87,447,463 bp
RNA expression pattern
Bgee	Human / Mouse (ortholog); Top expressed in: skin of arm; skin of thigh; skin of hip; gingival epithelium; jejunal mucosa; palpebral conjunctiva; corpus epididymis; cardiac muscle tissue of right atrium; tail of epididymis; amniotic fluid / Top expressed in: mesenteric lymph nodes; hair follicle; skin of back; skin of external ear; left colon; Rostral migratory stream; olfactory epithelium; subcutaneous adipose tissue; left lung lobe; cumulus cell; More reference expression data
BioGPS	n/a
Gene ontology
Molecular function	DNA-binding transcription factor activity; DEAD/H-box RNA helicase binding; DNA binding; sequence-specific DNA binding; RNA polymerase II transcription regulatory region sequence-specific DNA binding; DNA-binding transcription repressor activity, RNA polymerase II-specific; molecular function; DNA-binding transcription factor activity, RNA polymerase II-specific
Cellular component	RNA polymerase II transcription repressor complex; transcription repressor complex; nucleus
Biological process	regulation of transcription by RNA polymerase II; cell differentiation; regulation of transcription, DNA-templated; negative regulation of transcription by RNA polymerase II; cellular response to granulocyte macrophage colony-stimulating factor stimulus; transcription, DNA-templated; negative regulation of cell population proliferation; biological process
Sources:Amigo / QuickGO
Orthologs
Databases	NCBI: entry; OMA: entry
Species	Human	Mouse
Entrez	2117	27049
Ensembl	ENSG00000117036	ENSMUSG00000003382
UniProt	P41162	Q8R4Z4
RefSeq (mRNA)	NM_001145312; NM_005240	NM_001083318; NM_001286844; NM_012051; NM_001359750
RefSeq (protein)	NP_001138784; NP_005231	NP_001076787; NP_001273773; NP_036181; NP_001346679
Location (UCSC)	Chr 1: 157.12 – 157.14 Mb	Chr 3: 87.43 – 87.45 Mb
PubMed search
- Wikidata
View/Edit Human	View/Edit Mouse

Ets variant 3 is a protein that in humans is encoded by the ETV3 gene.
