= FBXO2 =

Protein-coding gene in the species Homo sapiens

Identifiers
- Aliases: FBXO2, FBG1, FBX2, Fbs1, NFB42, OCP1, F-box protein 2
- External IDs: OMIM: 607112; MGI: 2446216; GeneCards: FBXO2
Available structures
PDB	Ortholog search: PDBe RCSB
PDB	List of PDB id codes 1UMH, 1UMI, 2E31, 2E32, 2E33, 2RJ2

Gene location (Human)
Chr.	Chromosome 1 (human)
Band	1p36.22	Start	11,637,018 bp
Band	1p36.22	End	11,655,785 bp

Gene location (Mouse)
Chr.	Chromosome 4 (mouse)
Band	4 E2|4 78.68 cM	Start	148,245,078 bp
Band	4 E2|4 78.68 cM	End	148,250,881 bp
RNA expression pattern
Bgee	Human / Mouse (ortholog); Top expressed in: amygdala; C1 segment; right frontal lobe; anterior cingulate cortex; caudate nucleus; Brodmann area 9; putamen; nucleus accumbens; right hemisphere of cerebellum; prefrontal cortex / Top expressed in: vestibular membrane of cochlear duct; utricle; vestibular sensory epithelium; facial motor nucleus; anterior horn of spinal cord; optic nerve; stria vascularis; pontine nuclei; medial vestibular nucleus; cochlea; More reference expression data
BioGPS	More reference expression data
Gene ontology
Molecular function	amyloid-beta binding; carbohydrate binding; ubiquitin-protein transferase activity; protein binding; ubiquitin protein ligase activity
Cellular component	organelle membrane; membrane; SCF ubiquitin ligase complex; intracellular membrane-bounded organelle; dendritic spine; endoplasmic reticulum; cytosol; cytoplasm
Biological process	ubiquitin-dependent protein catabolic process; regulation of protein ubiquitination; proteolysis; SCF-dependent proteasomal ubiquitin-dependent protein catabolic process; protein ubiquitination; ubiquitin-dependent ERAD pathway; glycoprotein catabolic process; negative regulation of cell population proliferation; protein polyubiquitination; post-translational protein modification
Sources:Amigo / QuickGO
Orthologs
Databases	NCBI: entry; OMA: entry
Species	Human	Mouse
Entrez	26232	230904
Ensembl	ENSG00000116661	ENSMUSG00000041556
UniProt	Q9UK22	Q80UW2
RefSeq (mRNA)	NM_012168	NM_176848
RefSeq (protein)	NP_036300	NP_789818
Location (UCSC)	Chr 1: 11.64 – 11.66 Mb	Chr 4: 148.25 – 148.25 Mb
PubMed search
- Wikidata
View/Edit Human	View/Edit Mouse

F-box only protein 2 is a protein that in humans is encoded by the FBXO2 gene.

This gene encodes a member of the F-box protein family which is characterized by an approximately 40 amino acid motif, the F-box. The F-box proteins constitute one of the four subunits of the ubiquitin protein ligase complex called SCFs (SKP1-cullin-F-box), which function in phosphorylation-dependent ubiquitination.

The F-box proteins are divided into 3 classes: Fbws containing WD-40 domains, Fbls containing leucine-rich repeats, and Fbxs containing either different protein-protein interaction modules or no recognizable motifs. The protein encoded by this gene belongs to the Fbxs class. This protein is highly similar to the rat NFB42 (neural F Box 42 kDa) protein which is enriched in the nervous system and may play a role in maintaining neurons in a postmitotic state.
