= ETV7 =

Protein-coding gene in the species Homo sapiens

Identifiers
- Aliases: ETV7, TEL-2, TEL2, TELB, ETS variant 7, ETS variant transcription factor 7
- External IDs: OMIM: 605255; GeneCards: ETV7

Gene location (Human)
Chr.	Chromosome 6 (human)
Band	6p21.31	Start	36,354,091 bp
Band	6p21.31	End	36,387,800 bp
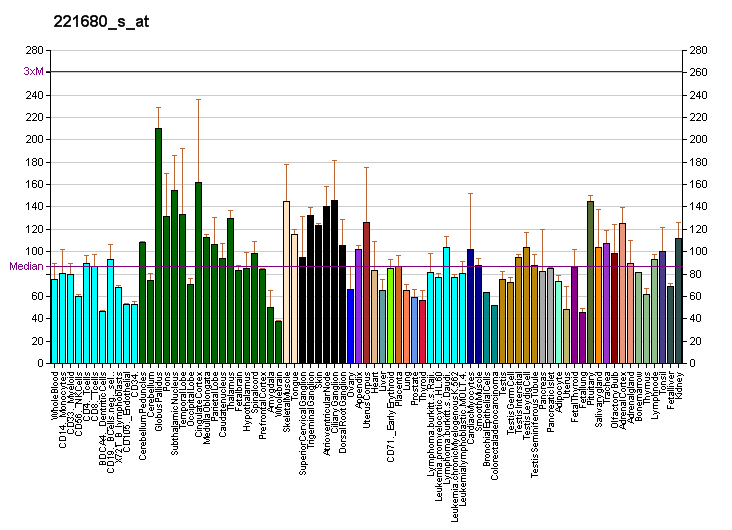
RNA expression pattern
Bgee	Human / Mouse (ortholog); Top expressed in: buccal mucosa cell; triceps brachii muscle; glutes; gonad; olfactory bulb; skin of leg; testicle; beta cell; skin of abdomen; granulocyte / n/a; More reference expression data
BioGPS	More reference expression data
Gene ontology
Molecular function	DNA-binding transcription factor activity; DNA binding; sequence-specific DNA binding; RNA polymerase II transcription regulatory region sequence-specific DNA binding; protein binding; DNA-binding transcription repressor activity, RNA polymerase II-specific; DNA-binding transcription factor activity, RNA polymerase II-specific
Cellular component	nucleus; nucleoplasm
Biological process	animal organ morphogenesis; cell differentiation; regulation of transcription, DNA-templated; negative regulation of transcription by RNA polymerase II; transcription by RNA polymerase II; transcription, DNA-templated; regulation of transcription by RNA polymerase II
Sources:Amigo / QuickGO
Orthologs
Databases	NCBI: entry; OMA: entry
Species	Human	Mouse
Entrez	51513	n/a
Ensembl	ENSG00000010030	n/a
UniProt	Q9Y603	n/a
RefSeq (mRNA)	NM_001207035; NM_001207036; NM_001207037; NM_001207038; NM_001207039 NM_001207040; NM_001207041; NM_016135	n/a
RefSeq (protein)	NP_001193964; NP_001193965; NP_001193966; NP_001193967; NP_001193968 NP_001193969; NP_001193970; NP_057219	n/a
Location (UCSC)	Chr 6: 36.35 – 36.39 Mb	n/a
PubMed search		n/a
- Wikidata
View/Edit Human

Transcription factor ETV7 is a protein that in humans is encoded by the ETV7 gene.
