= ELF1 =

Protein-coding gene in the species Homo sapiens

Identifiers
- Aliases: ELF1, E74 like ETS transcription factor 1, EFTUD1, RIA1
- External IDs: OMIM: 189973; MGI: 107180; GeneCards: ELF1

Gene location (Human)
Chr.	Chromosome 13 (human)
Band	13q14.11	Start	40,931,924 bp
Band	13q14.11	End	41,061,440 bp

Gene location (Mouse)
Chr.	Chromosome 14 (mouse)
Band	14|14 D3	Start	79,718,634 bp
Band	14|14 D3	End	79,819,934 bp
RNA expression pattern
Bgee	Human / Mouse (ortholog); Top expressed in: secondary oocyte; monocyte; lymph node; bone marrow cell; Achilles tendon; nipple; appendix; gallbladder; mucosa of pharynx; urethra / Top expressed in: mesenteric lymph nodes; decidua; thymus; mucosa of urinary bladder; transitional epithelium of urinary bladder; blood; left colon; spleen; lumbar spinal ganglion; left lung lobe; More reference expression data
BioGPS	n/a
Gene ontology
Molecular function	DNA-binding transcription factor activity; RNA polymerase II cis-regulatory region sequence-specific DNA binding; DNA binding; sequence-specific DNA binding; DNA-binding transcription activator activity, RNA polymerase II-specific; protein binding; DNA-binding transcription factor activity, RNA polymerase II-specific
Cellular component	nucleus; nucleoplasm
Biological process	regulation of cytokine production; positive regulation of transcription, DNA-templated; cell differentiation; regulation of transcription, DNA-templated; transcription, DNA-templated; positive regulation of transcription by RNA polymerase II; negative regulation of T cell receptor signaling pathway; transcription by RNA polymerase II; regulation of cytokine-mediated signaling pathway; regulation of B cell receptor signaling pathway; regulation of transcription by RNA polymerase II
Sources:Amigo / QuickGO
Orthologs
Databases	NCBI: entry; OMA: entry
Species	Human	Mouse
Entrez	1997	13709
Ensembl	ENSG00000120690	ENSMUSG00000036461
UniProt	P32519	Q60775
RefSeq (mRNA)	NM_001145353; NM_172373; NM_001370329; NM_001370330; NM_001370331 NM_001370332	NM_001286411; NM_001286412; NM_007920
RefSeq (protein)	NP_001138825; NP_758961; NP_001357258; NP_001357259; NP_001357260 NP_001357261	NP_001273340; NP_001273341; NP_031946
Location (UCSC)	Chr 13: 40.93 – 41.06 Mb	Chr 14: 79.72 – 79.82 Mb
PubMed search
- Wikidata
View/Edit Human	View/Edit Mouse

E74-like factor 1 (ets domain transcription factor) is a protein that in humans is encoded by the ELF1 gene. It was named for its similarity to E74, an ecdysone-inducible transcription factor from Drosophila.

== Function ==
This gene encodes an E26 transformation-specific related transcription factor. The encoded protein is primarily expressed in lymphoid cells and can act as both an enhancer and a repressor to regulate transcription of various genes. Alternative splicing results in multiple transcript variants.
