= ELF2 =

Protein-coding gene in the species Homo sapiens

Identifiers
- Aliases: ELF2, EU32, NERF, NERF-1A, NERF-1B, NERF-1a,b, NERF-2, E74 like ETS transcription factor 2
- External IDs: MGI: 1916507; GeneCards: ELF2

Gene location (Human)
Chr.	Chromosome 4 (human)
Band	4q31.1	Start	139,028,112 bp
Band	4q31.1	End	139,177,218 bp

Gene location (Mouse)
Chr.	Chromosome 3 (mouse)
Band	3|3 C	Start	51,160,141 bp
Band	3|3 C	End	51,248,084 bp
RNA expression pattern
Bgee	Human / Mouse (ortholog); Top expressed in: Achilles tendon; epithelium of colon; ganglionic eminence; ventricular zone; muscle of thigh; Descending thoracic aorta; right lung; skin of thigh; skin of hip; ascending aorta / Top expressed in: spermatocyte; spermatid; seminiferous tubule; ventricular zone; zygote; ganglionic eminence; dermis; Rostral migratory stream; tail of embryo; thymus; More reference expression data
BioGPS	n/a
Gene ontology
Molecular function	DNA-binding transcription factor activity; sequence-specific DNA binding; DNA binding; protein binding; DNA-binding transcription factor activity, RNA polymerase II-specific
Cellular component	nucleus; cytosol; nuclear body; nucleoplasm
Biological process	regulation of transcription by RNA polymerase II; positive regulation of transcription, DNA-templated; cell differentiation; negative regulation of transcription, DNA-templated; regulation of transcription, DNA-templated; transcription, DNA-templated; regulation of B cell receptor signaling pathway
Sources:Amigo / QuickGO
Orthologs
Databases	NCBI: entry; OMA: entry
Species	Human	Mouse
Entrez	1998	69257
Ensembl	ENSG00000109381	ENSMUSG00000037174
UniProt	Q15723	Q9JHC9
RefSeq (mRNA)	NM_001276457; NM_001276458; NM_001276459; NM_006874; NM_201999 NM_001331036	NM_001291059; NM_001291062; NM_001291063; NM_023502; NM_001356358
RefSeq (protein)	NP_001263386; NP_001263387; NP_001263388; NP_001317965; NP_006865 NP_973728; NP_001358253; NP_001358265; NP_001358266; NP_001358267; NP_001358268	NP_001277988; NP_001277991; NP_001277992; NP_075991; NP_001343287
Location (UCSC)	Chr 4: 139.03 – 139.18 Mb	Chr 3: 51.16 – 51.25 Mb
PubMed search
- Wikidata
View/Edit Human	View/Edit Mouse

E74-like factor 2 (ELF2), formerly known as new Ets-related factor (NERF), is an ETS family transcription factor. In humans this protein is encoded by the ELF2 gene.
