= ELK1 =

Protein-coding gene in humans

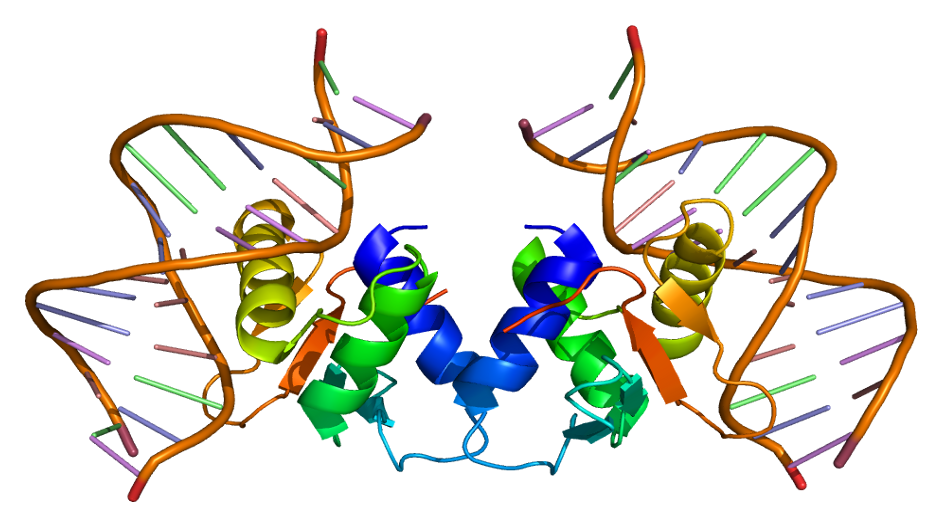

Identifiers
- Aliases: ELK1, ETS transcription factor, ETS transcription factor ELK1
- External IDs: OMIM: 311040; MGI: 101833; GeneCards: ELK1
Available structures
PDB	Ortholog search: PDBe RCSB
PDB	List of PDB id codes 1DUX

Gene location (Human)
Chr.	X chromosome (human)
Band	Xp11.23	Start	47,635,521 bp
Band	Xp11.23	End	47,650,604 bp

Gene location (Mouse)
Chr.	X chromosome (mouse)
Band	X A1.3|X 16.45 cM	Start	20,799,634 bp
Band	X A1.3|X 16.45 cM	End	20,816,847 bp
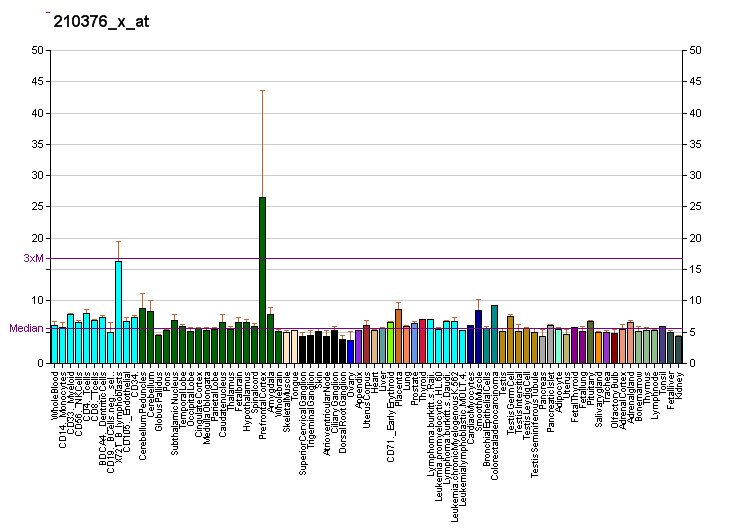

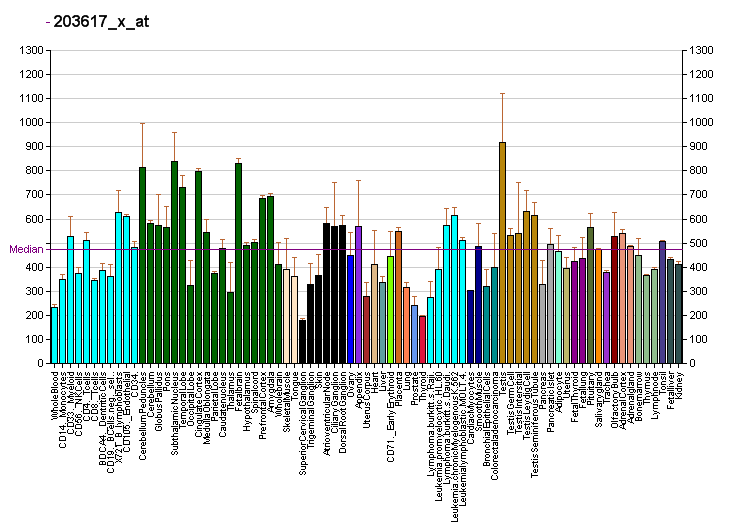
RNA expression pattern
Bgee	Human / Mouse (ortholog); Top expressed in: olfactory bulb; beta cell; thoracic diaphragm; vena cava; glutes; cardia; body of tongue; triceps brachii muscle; external globus pallidus; cerebellar vermis / Top expressed in: Rostral migratory stream; ciliary body; substantia nigra; dentate gyrus of hippocampal formation granule cell; internal carotid artery; fossa; cerebellar vermis; Paneth cell; lobe of cerebellum; cumulus cell; More reference expression data
BioGPS	More reference expression data
Gene ontology
Molecular function	DNA binding; sequence-specific DNA binding; DNA-binding transcription factor activity; DNA-binding transcription activator activity, RNA polymerase II-specific; chromatin binding; protein binding; double-stranded DNA binding; RNA polymerase II cis-regulatory region sequence-specific DNA binding; DNA-binding transcription factor activity, RNA polymerase II-specific
Cellular component	cytoplasm; axon terminus; nucleoplasm; soma; dendrite; mitochondrion; nucleus
Biological process	cell differentiation; regulation of transcription, DNA-templated; response to light stimulus; cellular response to testosterone stimulus; response to fibroblast growth factor; positive regulation of neuron death; transcription, DNA-templated; positive regulation of transcription, DNA-templated; cellular response to gamma radiation; cellular response to lipid; positive regulation of transcription by RNA polymerase II; transcription by RNA polymerase II; regulation of transcription by RNA polymerase II
Sources:Amigo / QuickGO
Orthologs
Databases	NCBI: entry; OMA: entry
Species	Human	Mouse
Entrez	2002	13712
Ensembl	ENSG00000126767	ENSMUSG00000009406
UniProt	P19419	P41969
RefSeq (mRNA)	NM_005229; NM_001114123; NM_001257168	NM_007922
RefSeq (protein)	NP_001107595; NP_001244097; NP_005220	NP_031948
Location (UCSC)	Chr X: 47.64 – 47.65 Mb	Chr X: 20.8 – 20.82 Mb
PubMed search
- Wikidata
View/Edit Human	View/Edit Mouse

ETS Like-1 protein Elk-1 is a protein that in humans is encoded by the ELK1. Elk-1 functions as a transcription activator. It is classified as a ternary complex factor (TCF), a subclass of the ETS family, which is characterized by a common protein domain that regulates DNA binding to target sequences. Elk1 plays important roles in various contexts, including long-term memory formation, drug addiction, Alzheimer's disease, Down syndrome, breast cancer, and depression.

== Structure ==
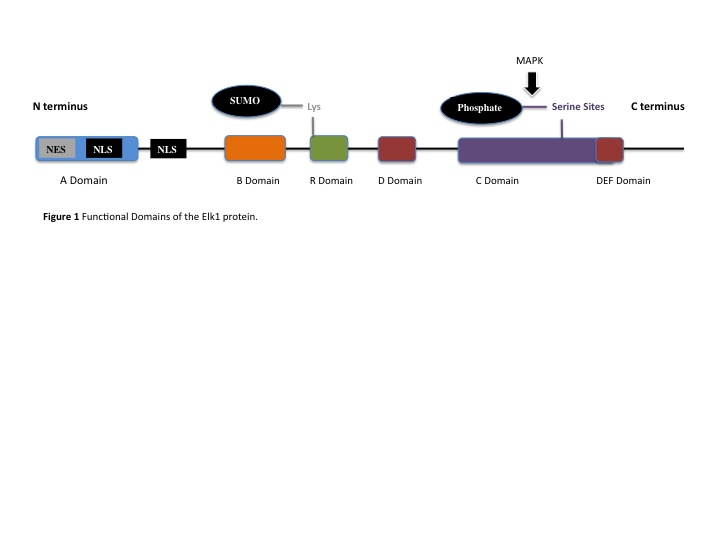
Figure 1

As depicted in Figure 1, the Elk1 protein is composed of several domains. Localized in the N-terminal region, the A domain is required for the binding of Elk1 to DNA. This region also contains a nuclear localization signal (NLS) and a nuclear export signal (NES), which are responsible for nuclear import and export, respectively. The B domain allows Elk1 to bind to a dimer of its cofactor, serum response factor (SRF). Located adjacent to the B domain, the R domain is involved in suppressing Elk1 transcriptional activity. This domain harbors the lysine residues that are likely to undergo SUMOylation, a post-translational event that strengthens the inhibition function of the R domain. The D domain plays the key role of binding to active Mitogen-activated protein kinases (MAPKs). Located in the C-terminal region of Elk1, the C domain includes the amino acids that actually become phosphorylated by MAPKs. In this region, Serine 383 and 389 are key sites that need to be phosphorylated for Elk1-mediated transcription to occur. Finally, the DEF domain is specific for the interaction of activated extracellular signal-regulated kinase (Erk), a type of MAPK, with Elk1.

== Expression ==
Given its role as a transcription factor, Elk1 is expressed in the nuclei of non-neuronal cells. The protein is present in the cytoplasm as well as in the nucleus of mature neurons. In post-mitotic neurons, a variant of Elk1, sElk1, is expressed solely in the nucleus because it lacks the NES site present in the full-length protein. Moreover, while Elk1 is broadly expressed, actual levels vary among tissues. The rat brain, for example, is extremely rich in Elk1, but the protein is exclusively expressed in neurons.

== Splice variants ==
Aside from the full-length protein, the Elk1 gene can yield two shortened versions of Elk1: ∆Elk1 and sElk1. Alternative splicing produces ∆Elk1. This variant lacks part of the DNA-binding domain that allows interaction with SRF. On the other hand, sElk1 has an intact region that binds to SRF, but it lacks the first 54 amino acids that contain the NES. Found only in neurons, sElk1 is created by employing an internal translation start site. Both ∆Elk1 and sElk1, truncated versions of full-length protein, are capable of binding to DNA and inducing various cellular signaling. In fact, sElk1 counteracts Elk1 in neuronal differentiation and the regulation of nerve growth factor/ERK signaling.

== Signaling ==
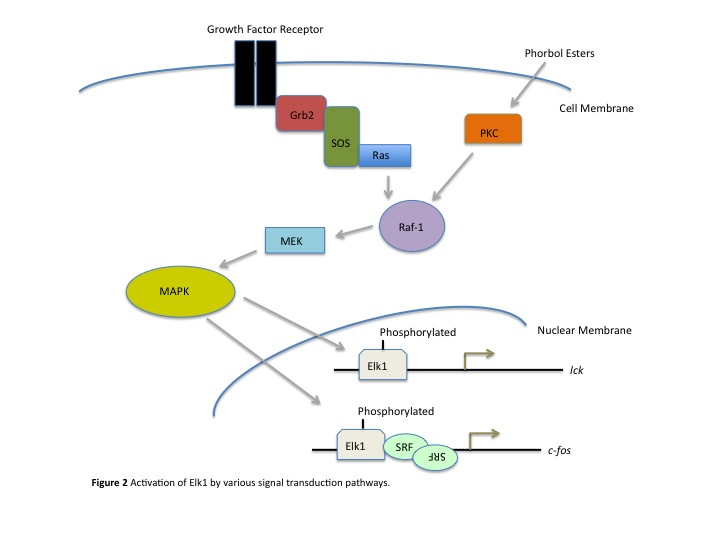
Figure 2

The downstream target of Elk1 is the serum response element (SRE) of the c-fos proto-oncogene. To produce c-fos, a protein encoded by the Fos gene, Elk1 needs to be phosphorylated by MAPKs at its C-terminus. MAPKs are the final effectors of signal transduction pathways that begin at the plasma membrane. Phosphorylation by MAPKs results in a conformational change of Elk1. As seen in Figure 2, Raf kinase acts upstream of MAPKs to activate them by phosphorylating and, thereby activating, MEKs, or MAPK or ERK kinases. Raf itself is activated by Ras, which is linked to growth factor receptors with tyrosine kinase activity via Grb2 and Sos. Grb2 and Sos can stimulate Ras only after the binding of growth factors to their corresponding receptors. However, Raf activation does not exclusively depend on Ras. Protein kinase C, which is activated by phorbol esters, can fulfill the same function as Ras. MEK kinase (MEKK) can also activate MEKs, which then activate MAPKs, making Raf unnecessary at times. Various signal transduction pathways, therefore, funnel through MEKs and MAPKs and lead to the activation of Elk1. After stimulation of Elk1, SRF, which allows Elk1 to bind to the c-fos promoter, must be recruited. The binding of Elk1 to SRF happens due to protein-protein interaction between the B domain of Elk1 and SRF and the protein-DNA interaction via the A domain.

The aforementioned proteins are like recipes for a certain signaling output. If one of these ingredients, such as SRF, is missing, then a different output occurs. In this case, lack of SRF leads to Elk1's activation of another gene. Elk1 can, thus, independently interact with an ETS binding site, as in the case of the lck proto-oncogene in Figure 2. Moreover, the spacing and relative orientation of the Elk1 binding site to the SRE is rather flexible, suggesting that the SRE-regulated early genes other than c-fos could be targets of Elk1. egr-1 is an example of an Elk1 target that depends on SRE interaction. Ultimately, phosphorylation of Elk1 can result in the production of many proteins, depending on the other factors involved and their specific interactions with each other.

When studying signaling pathways, mutations can further highlight the importance of each component used to activate the downstream target. For instance, disruption of the C-terminal domain of Elk1 that MAPK phosphorylates triggers inhibition of c-fos activation. Similarly, dysfunctional SRF, which normally tethers Elk1 to the SRE, leads to Fos not being transcribed. At the same time, without Elk1, SRF cannot induce c-fos transcription after MAPK stimulation. For these reasons, Elk1 represents an essential link between signal transduction pathways and the initiation of gene transcription.

== Clinical significance ==
=== Long-term memory ===
Formation of long-term memory may be dependent on Elk1. MEK inhibitors block Elk1 phosphorylation and, thus, impair acquired conditioned taste aversion. Moreover, avoidance learning, which involves the subject learning that a particular response leads to prevention of an aversive stimulus, is correlated with a definite increase in activation of Erk, Elk1, and c-fos in the hippocampus. This area of the brain is involved in short-term and long-term information storage. When Elk1 or SRF binding to DNA is blocked in the rat hippocampus, only sequestration of SRF interferes with long-term spatial memory. While the interaction of Elk1 with DNA may not be essential for memory formation, its specific role still needs to be explored. This is because activation of Elk1 can trigger other molecular events that do not require Elk1 to bind DNA. For example, Elk1 is involved in the phosphorylation of histones, increased interaction with SRF, and recruitment of the basal transcriptional machinery, all of which do not require direct binding of Elk1 to DNA.

=== Drug addiction ===
Elk1 activation plays a central role in drug addiction. After mice are given cocaine, a strong and momentary hyperphosphorylation of Erk and Elk1 is observed in the striatum. When these mice are then given MEK inhibitors, Elk1 phosphorylation is absent. Without active Elk1, c-fos production and cocaine-induced conditioned place preference are shown to be blocked. Moreover, acute ethanol ingestion leads to excessive phosphorylation of Elk1 in the amygdala. Silencing of Elk1 activity has also been found to decrease cellular responses to withdrawal signals and lingering treatment of opioids, one of the world's oldest known drugs. Altogether, these results highlight that Elk1 is an important component of drug addiction.

=== Pathophysiology ===
Buildup of beta amyloid (Aβ) peptides is shown to cause and/or trigger Alzheimer's disease. Aβ interferes with BDNF-induced phosphorylation of Elk1. With Elk1 activation being hindered in this pathway, the SRE-driven gene regulation leads to increased vulnerability of neurons. Elk1 also inhibits transcription of presenilin 1 (PS1), which encodes a protein that is necessary for the last step of the sequential proteolytic processing of amyloid precursor protein (APP). APP makes variants of Aβ (Aβ42/43 polypeptide). Moreover, PS1 is genetically associated with most early-onset cases of familial Alzheimer's disease. These data emphasize the intriguing link between Aβ, Elk1, and PS1.

Another condition associated with Elk1 is Down syndrome. Fetal and aged mice with this pathophysiological condition have shown a decrease in the activity of calcineurin, the major phosphatase for Elk1. These mice also have age-dependent changes in ERK activation. Moreover, expression of SUMO3, which represses Elk1 activity, increases in the adult patient with Down syndrome. Therefore, Down syndrome is correlated with changes in ERK, calcineurin, and SUMO pathways, all of which act antagonistically on Elk1 activity.

Elk1 also interacts with BRCA1 splice variants, namely BRCA1a and BRCA1b. This interaction enhances BRCA1-mediated growth suppression in breast cancer cells. Elk1 may be a downstream target of BRCA1 in its growth control pathway. Recent literature reveals that c-fos promoter activity is inhibited, while overexpression of BRCA1a/1b reduces MEK-induced activation of the SRE. These results show that one mechanism of growth and tumor suppression by BRCA1a/1b proteins acts through repression of the expression of Elk1 downstream target genes like Fos.

Depression has been linked with Elk1. Decreased Erk-mediated Elk1 phosphorylation is observed in the hippocampus and prefrontal cortex of post-mortem brains of suicidal individuals. Imbalanced Erk signaling is correlated with depression and suicidal behavior. Future research will reveal the exact role of Elk1 in the pathophysiology of depression.
