= Chromosome 16 =

Human chromosome

- Human chromosome 16 pair after G-banding. One is from mother, one is from father.

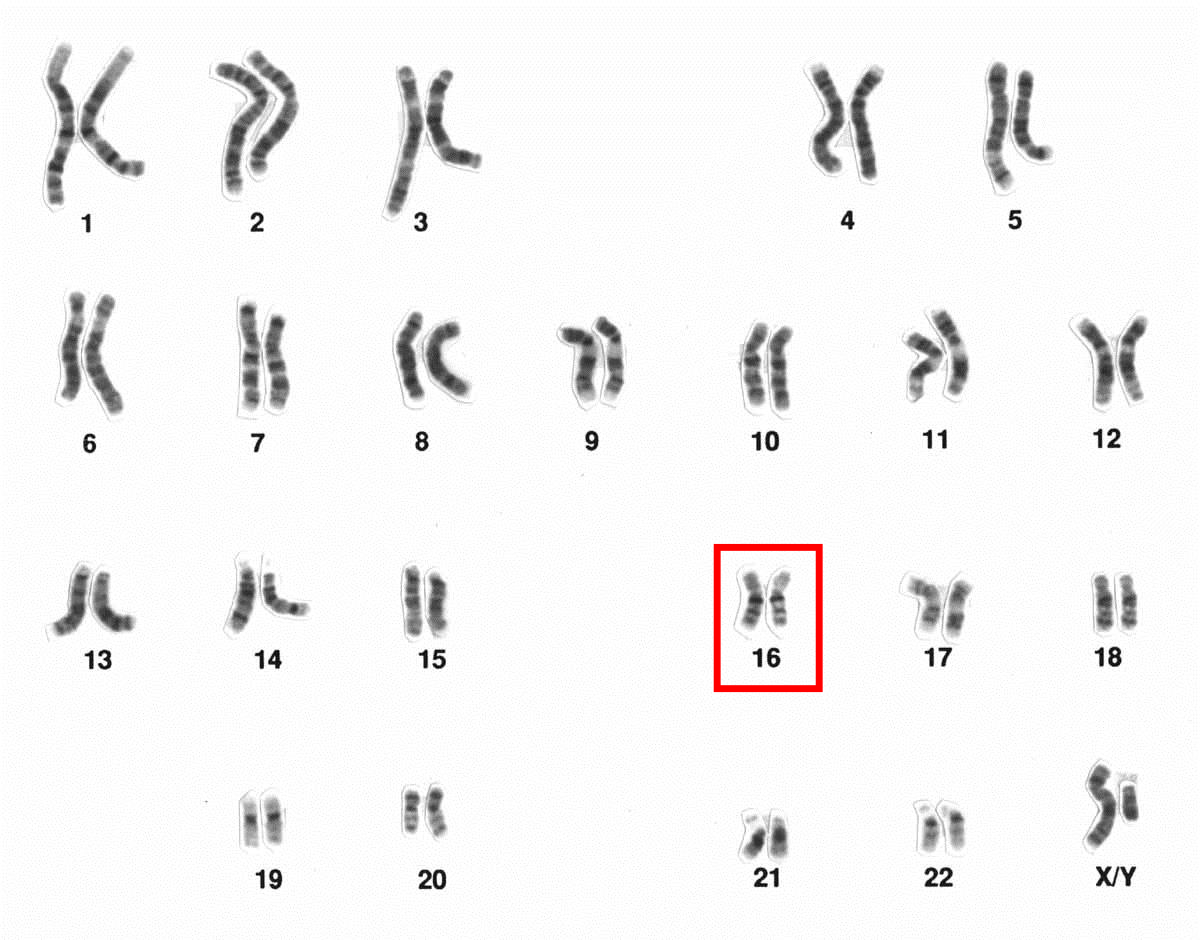
- Chromosome 16 pair in human male karyogram.

Features
- Length (bp): 96,330,374 bp (CHM13)
- No. of genes: 795 (CCDS)
- Type: Autosome
- Centromere position: Metacentric (36.8 Mbp)

Complete gene lists
- CCDS: Gene list
- HGNC: Gene list
- UniProt: Gene list
- NCBI: Gene list

External map viewers
- Ensembl: Chromosome 16
- Entrez: Chromosome 16
- NCBI: Chromosome 16
- UCSC: Chromosome 16

Full DNA sequences
- RefSeq: NC_000016 (FASTA)
- GenBank: CM000678 (FASTA)

Chromosome 16 is one of the 23 pairs of chromosomes in humans. People normally have two copies of this chromosome. Chromosome 16 spans about 90 million base pairs (the building material of DNA) and represents just under 3% of the total DNA in cells.

== Genes ==
=== Number of genes ===
The following are some of the gene count estimates of human chromosome 16. Because researchers use different approaches to genome annotation their predictions of the number of genes on each chromosome varies (for technical details, see gene prediction). Among various projects, the collaborative consensus coding sequence project (CCDS) takes an extremely conservative strategy. So CCDS's gene number prediction represents a lower bound on the total number of human protein-coding genes.

Estimated by	Protein-coding genes	Non-coding RNA genes	Pseudogenes	Source	Release date
CCDS	795	—	—		2016-09-08
HGNC	802	251	365		2017-05-12
Ensembl	865	1,046	462		2017-03-29
UniProt	838	—	—		2018-02-28
NCBI	912	652	502		2017-05-19

=== Gene list ===
The following is a partial list of genes on human chromosome 16. For complete list, see the link in the infobox on the right.

- AARS1: encoding enzyme Alanyl—tRNA synthetase 1
- ACSF3: encoding enzyme Acyl-CoA synthetase family member 3
- ACSM2B: encoding enzyme Acyl-coenzyme A synthetase ACSM2B, mitochondrial
- ACSM3: encoding enzyme Acyl-coenzyme A synthetase ACSM3, mitochondrial 2
- ADHD1: Attention deficit-hyperactivity disorder, susceptibility to, 1
- ARL6IP1: encoding protein ADP-ribosylation factor-like protein 6-interacting protein 1
- ARMC5
- BMIQ5: Body mass index quantitative trait locus 5
- C16orf58: encoding protein Chromosome 16 open reading frame 58
- C16orf71: encoding protein Uncharacterized protein Chromosome 16 Open Reading Frame 71
- C16orf82:
- C16orf84:
- C16orf95:
- C16orf96: encoding protein C16orf96, or chromosome 16 open reading frame 96,
- CARHSP1: Calcium-regulated heat stable protein 1
- CASP16P: encoding protein Caspase 16, pseudogene
- CCDC113: encoding protein Coiled-coil domain-containing protein 113
- Ccdc78: encoding protein Coiled-coil domain-containing 78 (CCDC78)
- CDIPT: CDP-diacylglycerol-inositol 3-phosphatidyltransferase
- CFDP1: Craniofacial development protein 1
- CHDS1: Coronary heart disease, susceptibility to, 1
- CIAPIN1: Anamorsin (originally, Cytokine induced apoptosis inhibitor 1)
- CKLF: Chemokine-like factor
- CLUAP1:
- CMTM2: encoding protein CKLF-like MARVEL transmembrane domain-containing protein 2
- CCDC135: encoding protein Coiled-coil domain-containing protein 135
- COTL1: encoding protein Coactosin-like protein
- CPNE7: encoding protein Copine 7
- CTRL: Chymotrypsin-like protease
- DCTPP1: encoding enzyme dCTP pyrophosphatase 1
- DEL16P12.1P11.2: Chromosome 16p12.2-p11.2 deletion syndrome
- DEL16p13.3, RSTSS: Chromosome 16p13.3 deletion syndrome (Rubinstein-Taybi deletion syndrome)
- DHX38: DEAH-box helicase 38
- DUP16p13.3, C16DUPq13.3: Chromosome 16p13.3 duplication syndrome
- EMP2: Epithelial membrane protein 2
- ENKD1: Enkurin domain-containing protein 1
- ERAF: Alpha-hemoglobin-stabilizing protein
- FAHD1: Fumarylacetoacetate hydrolase domain-containing protein 1
- FAM57B: Family with sequence similarity 57 member B
- FBRS: Probably fibrosin-1 long transcript protein
- FOXC2-AS1: encoding protein FOXC2 antisense RNA 1
- GLG1: Golgi apparatus protein 1
- HBAP1: Hemoglobin, alpha pseudogene 1
- HBHR, ATR1: Alpha-thalassemia/mental retardation syndrome, type 1
- HIRIP3: encoding protein HIRA-interacting protein 3
- IBD8: Inflammatory bowel disease 8
- IHPS2: Pyloric stenosis, infantile hypertrophic, 2
- ITFG3: encoding protein Protein ITFG3
- JPT2: encoding protein Jupiter microtubule associated homolog 2
- KDM8: encoding protein Lysine demethylase 8
- KIAA0895L: uncharacterized protein KIAA0895-like
- LINC00273 encoding protein Long intergenic non-protein coding RNA 273
- LOC124220: encoding protein Zymogen granule protein 16 homolog B
- LOC81691:
- LUC7L: encoding protein Putative RNA-binding protein Luc7-like 1
- LYPLA3: encoding enzyme Group XV phospholipase A2
- MC1R: melanocortin 1 receptor
- MCOPCT1: Microphthalmia with cataract 1
- METRN: encoding protein Meteorin, glial cell differentiation regulator
- METTL26/JFP2: encoding protein Chromosome 16 open reading frame 13
- MKL2: encoding protein MKL/myocardin-like protein 2
- MPHOSPH6: encoding enzyme M-phase phosphoprotein 6
- MT1G: encoding protein Metallothionein-1G
- MT1X: encoding protein Metallothionein 1X
- NIP30: encoding protein NIP30 protein
- NOB1: encoding protein RNA-binding protein NOB1
- NOMO1: encoding protein Nodal modulator 1
- NPW: encoding protein Neuropeptide W
- NUBP2: encoding protein Nucleotide-binding protein 2
- NUPR1: encoding protein Nuclear protein 1
- OGFOD1:
- PDF: encoding enzyme Peptide deformylase, mitochondrial
- PDPR: encoding protein Pyruvate dehydrogenase phosphatase regulatory subunit
- PKDTS: Polycystic kidney disease, infantile severe, with tuberous sclerosis
- PMFBP1: encoding protein Polyamine-modulated factor 1-binding protein 1
- POLR3K: encoding enzyme DNA-directed RNA polymerase III subunit RPC10
- PRMT7: encoding protein Protein arginine methyltransferase 7
- PRR35: encoding protein Proline rich 35
- RPS15A: encoding protein 40S ribosomal protein S15a
- RSL1D1: encoding protein Ribosomal L1 domain-containing protein 1
- SHCBP1: encoding protein SHC SH2 domain-binding protein 1
- SLZ1: encoding protein SLX1 structure-specific endonuclease subunit homolog B (S. cerevisiae)
- SNAI3-AS1: encoding protein SNAI3 antisense RNA 1
- SNORD71: encoding protein Small nucleolar RNA, C/D box 71
- SPSB3: encoding protein SplA/ryanodine receptor domain and SOCS box containing 3
- SRCAP: encoding enzyme Helicase SRCAP
- TANGO6: encoding protein Transport and Golgi organization protein 6 homolog
- TAO2: encoding Serine/threonine-protein kinase TAO2
- TBC1D24: encoding protein TBC1 domain family, member 24
- TEDC2: encoding protein Tubulin epsilon and delta complex 2
- TELO2: encoding protein Telomere length regulation protein TEL2 homolog
- TMEM112: encoding enzyme Lipase maturation factor 1
- TMEM8A: encoding protein Transmembrane protein 8A
- TNRC6A: encoding protein Trinucleotide repeat-containing gene 6A protein
- Tuberous sclerosis complex tumor suppressors: encoding [[]] FALSE
- TSR3: encoding
- UNKL: encoding protein RING finger protein unkempt-like
- VAT1L: encoding protein Vesicle amine transport protein 1 homolog (T. californica)-like
- VPS35L: encoding protein VPS35 Endosomal Protein Sorting Factor Like
- WFDC1: encoding protein WAP four-disulfide core domain protein 1
- ZG16
- ZNF23: encoding protein Zinc finger protein 23
- ZNF200: encoding protein Zinc finger protein 200
- ZNF263: encoding protein Zinc finger protein 263
- ZNF629: encoding protein Zinc finger protein 629
- ZNF843: encoding protein Zinc finger protein 843

== Diseases and disorders ==
- Attention deficit hyperactivity disorder (ADHD)
- Asperger syndrome
- Autism spectrum disorder
- Autosomal dominant polycystic kidney disease (PKD-1)
- Batten disease
- Combined malonic and methylmalonic aciduria (CMAMMA)
- Familial Mediterranean fever (FMF)
- Synesthesia
- Thalassemia
- Trisomy 16
- Morquio syndrome
- Hao-Fountain Syndrome

== Associated traits ==
- Red hair

== Cytogenetic band ==
G-banding ideograms of human chromosome 16

G-banding ideogram of human chromosome 16 in resolution 850 bphs. Band length in this diagram is proportional to base-pair length. This type of ideogram is generally used in genome browsers (e.g. Ensembl, UCSC Genome Browser).

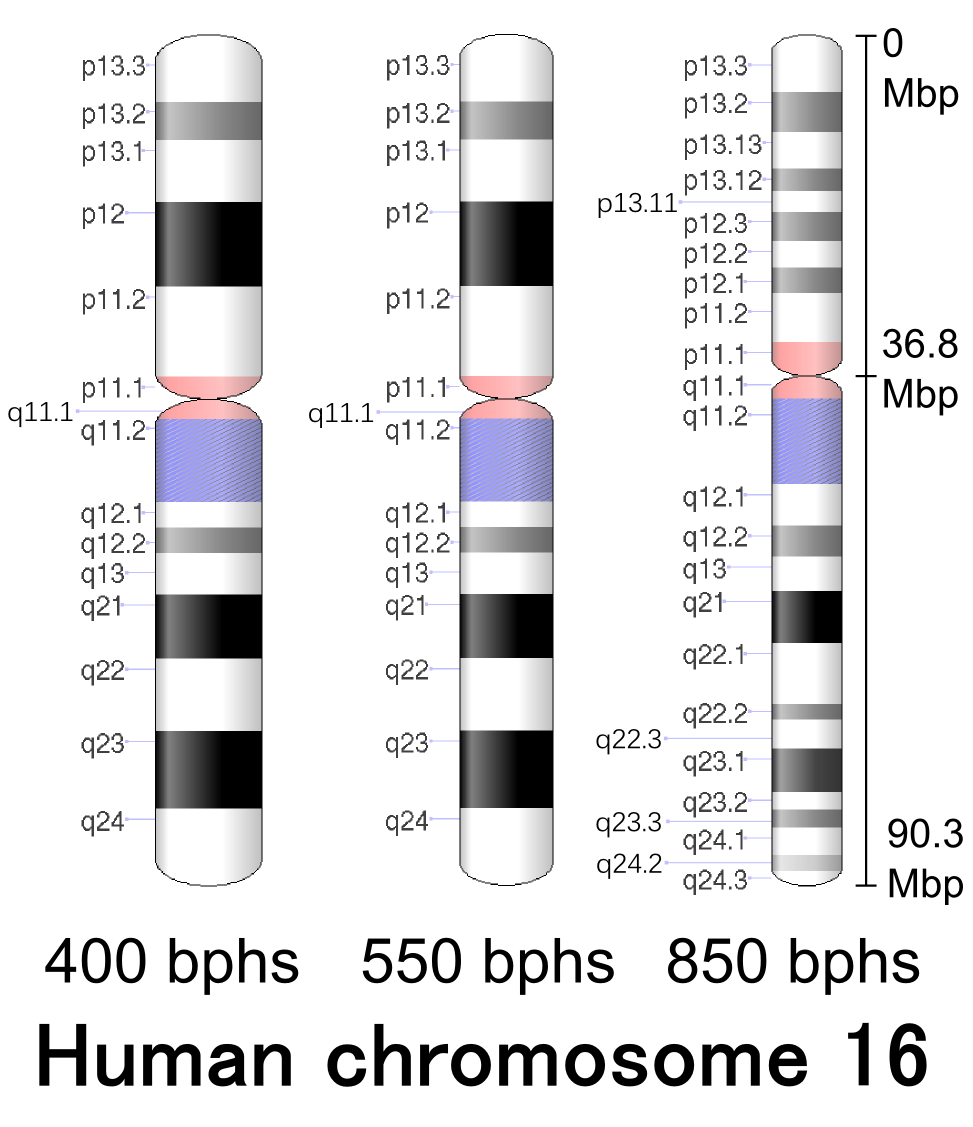
G-banding patterns of human chromosome 16 in three different resolutions (400, 550 and 850). Band length in this diagram is based on the ideograms from ISCN (2013). This type of ideogram represents actual relative band length observed under a microscope at the different moments during the mitotic process.

G-bands of human chromosome 16 in resolution 850 bphs
Chr.	Arm	Band	ISCN start	ISCN stop	Basepair start	Basepair stop	Stain	Density
16	p	13.3	0	352	1	7,800,000	gneg	
16	p	13.2	352	596	7,800,001	10,400,000	gpos	50
16	p	13.13	596	813	10,400,001	12,500,000	gneg	
16	p	13.12	813	948	12,500,001	14,700,000	gpos	50
16	p	13.11	948	1070	14,700,001	16,700,000	gneg	
16	p	12.3	1070	1246	16,700,001	21,200,000	gpos	50
16	p	12.2	1246	1409	21,200,001	24,200,000	gneg	
16	p	12.1	1409	1558	24,200,001	28,500,000	gpos	50
16	p	11.2	1558	1856	28,500,001	35,300,000	gneg	
16	p	11.1	1856	2045	35,300,001	36,800,000	acen	
16	q	11.1	2045	2194	36,800,001	38,400,000	acen	
16	q	11.2	2194	2709	38,400,001	47,000,000	gvar	
16	q	12.1	2709	2953	47,000,001	52,600,000	gneg	
16	q	12.2	2953	3142	52,600,001	56,000,000	gpos	50
16	q	13	3142	3346	56,000,001	57,300,000	gneg	
16	q	21	3346	3657	57,300,001	66,600,000	gpos	100
16	q	22.1	3657	4023	66,600,001	70,800,000	gneg	
16	q	22.2	4023	4118	70,800,001	72,800,000	gpos	50
16	q	22.3	4118	4294	72,800,001	74,100,000	gneg	
16	q	23.1	4294	4551	74,100,001	79,200,000	gpos	75
16	q	23.2	4551	4659	79,200,001	81,600,000	gneg	
16	q	23.3	4659	4768	81,600,001	84,100,000	gpos	50
16	q	24.1	4768	4930	84,100,001	87,000,000	gneg	
16	q	24.2	4930	5025	87,000,001	88,700,000	gpos	25
16	q	24.3	5025	5120	88,700,001	90,338,345	gneg	
