= PSME3-interacting protein =

Protein-coding gene in the species Homo sapiens

PSME3IP1

Identifiers
- Aliases: PSME3IP1, C16orf94, CDA018, NIP30, CDA10, family with sequence similarity 192 member A, PIP30, FAM192A, proteasome activator subunit 3 interacting protein 1
- External IDs: OMIM: 617766; MGI: 1919637; GeneCards: PSME3IP1

Gene location (Human)
Chr.	Chromosome 16 (human)
Band	16q13	Start	57,152,466 bp
Band	16q13	End	57,186,116 bp

Gene location (Mouse)
Chr.	Chromosome 8 (mouse)
Band	8|8 C5	Start	95,300,766 bp
Band	8|8 C5	End	95,328,625 bp
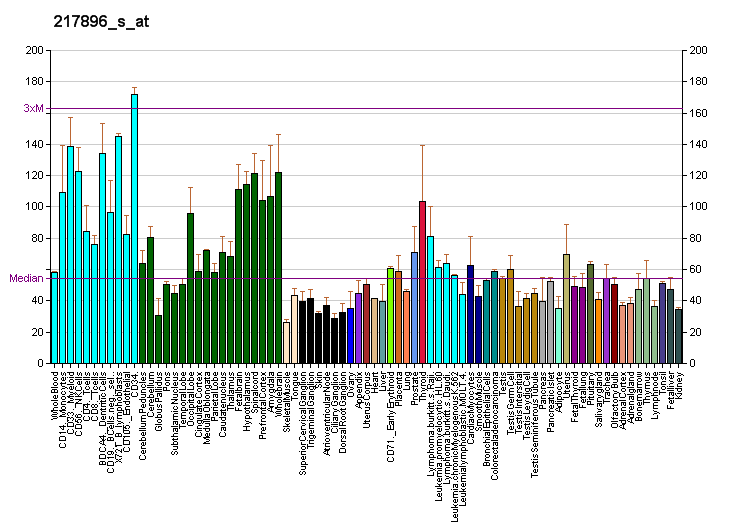
RNA expression pattern
Bgee	Human / Mouse (ortholog); Top expressed in: Achilles tendon; monocyte; granulocyte; right uterine tube; left testis; ganglionic eminence; rectum; right testis; sural nerve; transverse colon / Top expressed in: zygote; tail of embryo; Ileal epithelium; ventricular zone; primary oocyte; medial ganglionic eminence; neural layer of retina; genital tubercle; epiblast; neural tube; More reference expression data
BioGPS	More reference expression data
Gene ontology
Molecular function	protein binding
Cellular component	nucleus
Biological process	negative regulation of protein binding; negative regulation of proteasomal protein catabolic process
Sources:Amigo / QuickGO
Orthologs
Databases	NCBI: entry; OMA: entry
Species	Human	Mouse
Entrez	80011	102122
Ensembl	ENSG00000172775	ENSMUSG00000031774
UniProt	Q9GZU8	Q91WE2
RefSeq (mRNA)	NM_024946; NM_001354078; NM_001354079; NM_001354080; NM_001354081 NM_001354082; NM_001354083; NM_001354084; NM_001354085; NM_001354086; NM_001354088; NM_001354090; NM_001354091; NM_001354092; NM_001354094; NM_001354097; NM_001354098; NM_001354099; NM_001354100; NM_001354087; NM_001354089; NM_001354095; NM_001354096; NM_001354101; NM_001354102; NM_001354103	NM_028221; NM_001363456; NM_001363457
RefSeq (protein)	NP_079222; NP_001341007; NP_001341008; NP_001341009; NP_001341010 NP_001341011; NP_001341012; NP_001341013; NP_001341014; NP_001341015; NP_001341017; NP_001341019; NP_001341020; NP_001341021; NP_001341023; NP_001341026; NP_001341027; NP_001341028; NP_001341029; NP_001341016; NP_001341018; NP_001341024; NP_001341025; NP_001341030; NP_001341031; NP_001341032	NP_082497; NP_001350385; NP_001350386
Location (UCSC)	Chr 16: 57.15 – 57.19 Mb	Chr 8: 95.3 – 95.33 Mb
PubMed search
- Wikidata
View/Edit Human	View/Edit Mouse

PSME3-interacting protein (also called NIP30) is a protein that in humans is encoded by the PSME3IP1 gene (previously FAM192A). The PSME3-interacting protein contributes to the association of PSME3 to the 20S proteasome, and is also involved in regulating its activity. In particular, it inhibits the break-down of certain proteasome substrates, and the inhibits the interaction of PSME3 and coilin which promotes an increase in the number of cajal bodies in the nucleus.
