= RUS family member 1 =

Protein-coding gene in the species Homo sapiens

RUSF1

Identifiers
- Aliases: RUSF1, RUS, chromosome 16 open reading frame 58, C16orf58, RUS family member 1
- External IDs: MGI: 2384572; HomoloGene: 11232; GeneCards: RUSF1; OMA:RUSF1 - orthologs

Gene location (Human)
Chr.	Chromosome 16 (human)
Band	16p11.2	Start	31,489,471 bp
Band	16p11.2	End	31,509,309 bp

Gene location (Mouse)
Chr.	Chromosome 7 (mouse)
Band	7|7 F3	Start	127,870,551 bp
Band	7|7 F3	End	127,897,342 bp
RNA expression pattern
Bgee	Human / Mouse (ortholog); Top expressed in: anterior pituitary; left ovary; right ovary; right lobe of thyroid gland; right uterine tube; canal of the cervix; left lobe of thyroid gland; body of pancreas; body of uterus; right lobe of liver / Top expressed in: internal carotid artery; external carotid artery; yolk sac; zygote; right kidney; neural layer of retina; epithelium of small intestine; proximal tubule; genital tubercle; secondary oocyte; More reference expression data
BioGPS	n/a
Orthologs
Species	Human	Mouse
Entrez	64755	233913
Ensembl	ENSG00000140688	ENSMUSG00000030780
UniProt	Q96GQ5	Q91W34
RefSeq (mRNA)	NM_022744	NM_145590; NM_001360882
RefSeq (protein)	NP_073581	NP_663565; NP_001347811
Location (UCSC)	Chr 16: 31.49 – 31.51 Mb	Chr 7: 127.87 – 127.9 Mb
PubMed search
- Wikidata
View/Edit Human	View/Edit Mouse

RUS family member 1 is a protein which in humans is encoded by the RUSF1 gene (previously C16orf58). During root morphogenesis, the related plant protein is involved in ultraviolet B light-sensing. Not much has been reported about the function of the protein in mammals, but there is a domain of unknown function, DUF647, which may play a part in protein-protein interaction.
