= MPHOSPH6 =

Protein-coding gene in the species Homo sapiens

Identifiers
- Aliases: MPHOSPH6, MPP, MPP-6, MPP6, M-phase phosphoprotein 6
- External IDs: OMIM: 605500; MGI: 1915783; HomoloGene: 38100; GeneCards: MPHOSPH6; OMA:MPHOSPH6 - orthologs

Gene location (Human)
Chr.	Chromosome 16 (human)
Band	16q23.3	Start	82,147,798 bp
Band	16q23.3	End	82,170,224 bp

Gene location (Mouse)
Chr.	Chromosome 8 (mouse)
Band	8|8 E1	Start	118,518,384 bp
Band	8|8 E1	End	118,528,682 bp
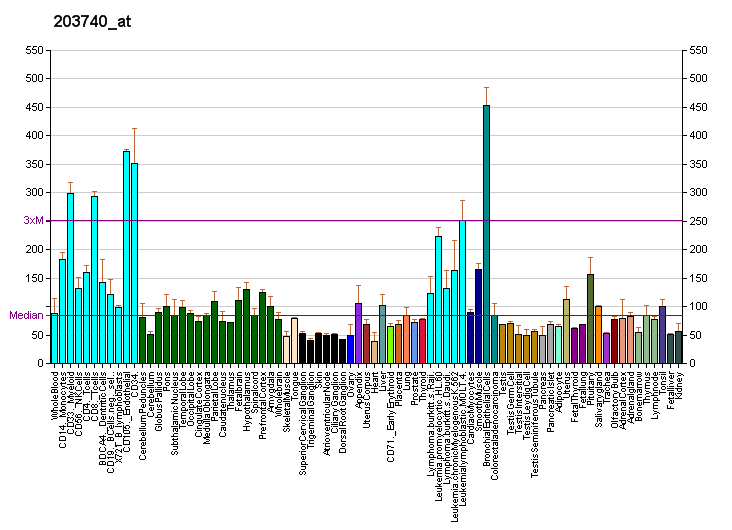
RNA expression pattern
Bgee	Human / Mouse (ortholog); Top expressed in: oocyte; secondary oocyte; middle temporal gyrus; gingival epithelium; Brodmann area 23; skin of abdomen; minor salivary glands; rectum; vulva; hair follicle / Top expressed in: zygote; primary oocyte; secondary oocyte; otic placode; primitive streak; epiblast; yolk sac; embryo; embryo; otic vesicle; More reference expression data
BioGPS	More reference expression data
Gene ontology
Molecular function	protein binding; RNA binding
Cellular component	nuclear exosome (RNase complex); nucleolus; exosome (RNase complex); nucleus; nucleoplasm; cytoplasm
Biological process	maturation of 5.8S rRNA; rRNA processing
Sources:Amigo / QuickGO
Orthologs
Species	Human	Mouse
Entrez	10200	68533
Ensembl	ENSG00000135698	ENSMUSG00000031843
UniProt	Q99547	Q9D1Q1
RefSeq (mRNA)	NM_005792	NM_026758; NM_001357232; NM_001357233
RefSeq (protein)	NP_005783	NP_081034; NP_001344161; NP_001344162
Location (UCSC)	Chr 16: 82.15 – 82.17 Mb	Chr 8: 118.52 – 118.53 Mb
PubMed search
- Wikidata
View/Edit Human	View/Edit Mouse

M-phase phosphoprotein 6 is an enzyme that in humans is encoded by the MPHOSPH6 gene.
