= ARL6IP1 =

Protein-coding gene in the species Homo sapiens

Identifiers
- Aliases: ARL6IP1, AIP1, ARL6IP, ARMER, SPG61, ADP ribosylation factor like GTPase 6 interacting protein 1
- External IDs: OMIM: 607669; MGI: 1858943; HomoloGene: 41008; GeneCards: ARL6IP1; OMA:ARL6IP1 - orthologs

Gene location (Human)
Chr.	Chromosome 16 (human)
Band	16p12.3	Start	18,791,669 bp
Band	16p12.3	End	18,801,572 bp

Gene location (Mouse)
Chr.	Chromosome 7 (mouse)
Band	7|7 F1	Start	117,718,114 bp
Band	7|7 F1	End	117,728,885 bp
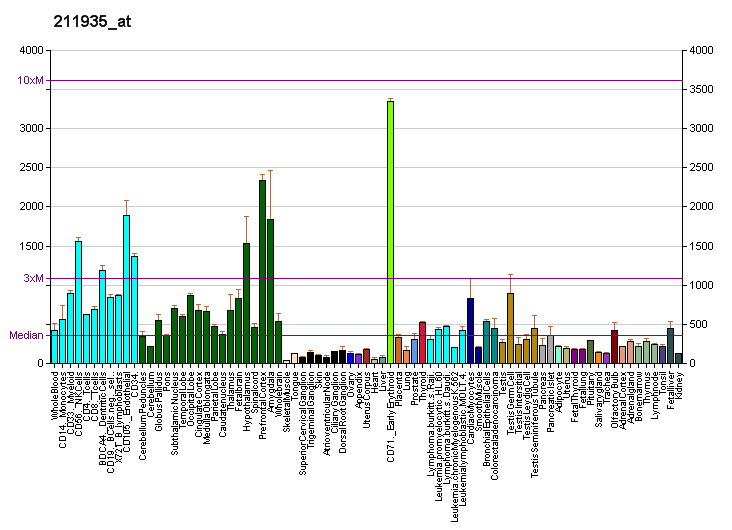
RNA expression pattern
Bgee	Human / Mouse (ortholog); Top expressed in: retinal pigment epithelium; ventricular zone; superior frontal gyrus; embryo; ganglionic eminence; postcentral gyrus; pons; Brodmann area 9; orbitofrontal cortex; prefrontal cortex / Top expressed in: retinal pigment epithelium; Epithelium of choroid plexus; spermatocyte; neural layer of retina; right kidney; yolk sac; choroid plexus of fourth ventricle; ciliary body; fetal liver hematopoietic progenitor cell; human kidney; More reference expression data
BioGPS	More reference expression data
Gene ontology
Molecular function	protein binding; identical protein binding
Cellular component	cytoplasm; cytosol; membrane; Sec61; endoplasmic reticulum; endomembrane system; endoplasmic reticulum membrane; integral component of endoplasmic reticulum membrane; integral component of membrane
Biological process	cotranslational protein targeting to membrane; endoplasmic reticulum tubular network formation; apoptotic process; negative regulation of cysteine-type endopeptidase activity involved in apoptotic process; endoplasmic reticulum tubular network membrane organization; negative regulation of apoptotic process; positive regulation of L-glutamate import across plasma membrane
Sources:Amigo / QuickGO
Orthologs
Species	Human	Mouse
Entrez	23204	54208
Ensembl	ENSG00000170540	ENSMUSG00000030654
UniProt	Q15041	Q9JKW0
RefSeq (mRNA)	NM_015161; NM_001313858	NM_019419
RefSeq (protein)	NP_001300787; NP_055976	NP_062292
Location (UCSC)	Chr 16: 18.79 – 18.8 Mb	Chr 7: 117.72 – 117.73 Mb
PubMed search
- Wikidata
View/Edit Human	View/Edit Mouse

ADP-ribosylation factor-like protein 6-interacting protein 1 is a protein that in humans is encoded by the ARL6IP1 gene.
