= METRN =

Protein-coding gene in the species Homo sapiens

Identifiers
- Aliases: METRN, C16orf23, c380A1.2, meteorin, glial cell differentiation regulator
- External IDs: OMIM: 610998; MGI: 1917333; HomoloGene: 11432; GeneCards: METRN; OMA:METRN - orthologs

Gene location (Human)
Chr.	Chromosome 16 (human)
Band	16p13.3	Start	715,118 bp
Band	16p13.3	End	719,655 bp

Gene location (Mouse)
Chr.	Chromosome 17 (mouse)
Band	17|17 A3.3	Start	26,012,195 bp
Band	17|17 A3.3	End	26,016,110 bp
RNA expression pattern
Bgee	Human / Mouse (ortholog); Top expressed in: C1 segment; right uterine tube; caudate nucleus; nucleus accumbens; amygdala; right frontal lobe; putamen; anterior cingulate cortex; ventral tegmental area; anterior pituitary / Top expressed in: optic nerve; cerebellar cortex; somite; cerebellar vermis; lobe of cerebellum; median eminence; interventricular septum; superior frontal gyrus; lumbar subsegment of spinal cord; visual cortex; More reference expression data
BioGPS	n/a
Gene ontology
Molecular function	hormone activity
Cellular component	extracellular region; extracellular space
Biological process	multicellular organism development; cell differentiation; glial cell differentiation; positive regulation of axonogenesis; nervous system development; signal transduction
Sources:Amigo / QuickGO
Orthologs
Species	Human	Mouse
Entrez	79006	70083
Ensembl	ENSG00000103260	ENSMUSG00000002274
UniProt	Q9UJH8	Q8C1Q4
RefSeq (mRNA)	NM_024042	NM_133719
RefSeq (protein)	NP_076947	NP_598480
Location (UCSC)	Chr 16: 0.72 – 0.72 Mb	Chr 17: 26.01 – 26.02 Mb
PubMed search
- Wikidata
View/Edit Human	View/Edit Mouse

Meteorin, glial cell differentiation regulator is a protein that in humans is encoded by the METRN gene.

== Function ==
Meteorin regulates glial cell differentiation and promotes the formation of axonal networks during neurogenesis. Aligned with its neurotrophic properties Meteorin promotes neurotic outgrowth of cultured dorsal root ganglion sensory neurons via a mechanism that involves satellite glial cells. Meteorin also has been shown to have profound and extremely long-lasting analgesic effects in animal models of inflammatory and neuropathic pain.

The human variant of the protein is currently being developed by the Danish biotechnology company, Hoba Therapeutics, for the treatment of neuropathic pain in humans.
