= ZNF843 =

Protein-coding gene in the species Homo sapiens

Identifiers
- Aliases: ZNF843, zinc finger protein 843
- External IDs: GeneCards: ZNF843

Gene location (Human)
Chr.	Chromosome 16 (human)
Band	16p11.2	Start	31,432,593 bp
Band	16p11.2	End	31,443,160 bp
RNA expression pattern
Bgee	Human / Mouse (ortholog); Top expressed in: secondary oocyte; skin of thigh; stromal cell of endometrium; islet of Langerhans; thymus; gastrocnemius muscle; skin of hip; prefrontal cortex; muscle of thigh; skeletal muscle tissue / n/a; More reference expression data
BioGPS	n/a
Orthologs
Databases	NCBI: entry; OMA: entry
Species	Human	Mouse
Entrez	283933	n/a
Ensembl	ENSG00000176723	n/a
UniProt	Q8N446	n/a
RefSeq (mRNA)	NM_001136509; NM_001353381	n/a
RefSeq (protein)	NP_001129981; NP_001340310	n/a
Location (UCSC)	Chr 16: 31.43 – 31.44 Mb	n/a
PubMed search		n/a
- Wikidata
View/Edit Human

Zinc finger protein 843 is a protein that in humans is encoded by the ZNF843 gene.
