= Caspase 16, pseudogene =

Pseudogene in humans

CASP16P

Identifiers
- Aliases: CASP16P, CASP14L, CASP16, caspase 16, pseudogene
- External IDs: MGI: 3646305; HomoloGene: 72522; GeneCards: CASP16P; OMA:CASP16P - orthologs

Gene location (Human)
Chr.	Chromosome 16 (human)
Band	16p13.3	Start	3,144,015 bp
Band	16p13.3	End	3,149,963 bp
Orthologs
Species	Human	Mouse
Entrez	197350	381070
Ensembl	ENSG00000228146	n/a
UniProt	n a	n/a
RefSeq (mRNA)	n/a	n/a
RefSeq (protein)	n/a	n/a
Location (UCSC)	Chr 16: 3.14 – 3.15 Mb	n/a
PubMed search
- Wikidata
View/Edit Human	View/Edit Mouse

Caspase 16, pseudogene is a protein that in humans is encoded by the CASP16P gene, but not translated.
