= CTU2 =

Protein-coding gene in the species Homo sapiens

Identifiers
- Aliases: CTU2, C16orf84, NCS2, UPF0432, cytosolic thiouridylase subunit 2, MFRG
- External IDs: OMIM: 617057; MGI: 1914215; HomoloGene: 79815; GeneCards: CTU2; OMA:CTU2 - orthologs

Gene location (Human)
Chr.	Chromosome 16 (human)
Band	16q24.3	Start	88,706,483 bp
Band	16q24.3	End	88,715,396 bp

Gene location (Mouse)
Chr.	Chromosome 8 (mouse)
Band	8|8 E1	Start	123,202,882 bp
Band	8|8 E1	End	123,210,877 bp
RNA expression pattern
Bgee	Human / Mouse (ortholog); Top expressed in: oocyte; gonad; muscle of thigh; gastrocnemius muscle; left uterine tube; prefrontal cortex; apex of heart; right frontal lobe; Brodmann area 9; cingulate gyrus / Top expressed in: otic vesicle; Paneth cell; fossa; medullary collecting duct; condyle; Rostral migratory stream; trigeminal ganglion; renal corpuscle; internal carotid artery; hair follicle; More reference expression data
BioGPS	n/a
Gene ontology
Molecular function	tRNA binding; protein binding; sulfurtransferase activity; nucleotidyltransferase activity
Cellular component	cytoplasm; cytosol; protein-containing complex
Biological process	tRNA wobble uridine modification; tRNA thio-modification; tRNA processing; tRNA wobble position uridine thiolation; protein urmylation; tRNA modification
Sources:Amigo / QuickGO
Orthologs
Species	Human	Mouse
Entrez	348180	66965
Ensembl	ENSG00000174177	ENSMUSG00000049482
UniProt	Q2VPK5	Q3U308
RefSeq (mRNA)	NM_001012759; NM_001012762; NM_001318507; NM_001318513	NM_153775
RefSeq (protein)	NP_001012777; NP_001012780; NP_001305436; NP_001305442	NP_722470
Location (UCSC)	Chr 16: 88.71 – 88.72 Mb	Chr 8: 123.2 – 123.21 Mb
PubMed search
- Wikidata
View/Edit Human	View/Edit Mouse

CTU2 (formerly known as C16orf84) is a human gene located on chromosome 16. The mRNA encodes the longer isoform. The gene encodes a cytoplasmic protein that plays a probable role in tRNA modification.
