= SNAI3 antisense RNA 1 =

Non-coding RNA in humans

SNAI3-AS1

Identifiers
- Aliases: SNAI3-AS1, SNAI3 antisense RNA 1
- External IDs: GeneCards: SNAI3-AS1

Gene location (Human)
Chr.	Chromosome 16 (human)
Band	16q24.2	Start	88,663,298 bp
Band	16q24.2	End	88,687,282 bp
RNA expression pattern
Bgee	Human / Mouse (ortholog); Top expressed in: right frontal lobe; anterior cingulate cortex; Brodmann area 9; amygdala; apex of heart; prefrontal cortex; putamen; caudate nucleus; nucleus accumbens; muscle of thigh / n/a; More reference expression data
BioGPS	n/a
Orthologs
Databases	NCBI: entry; OMA: entry
Species	Human	Mouse
Entrez	197187	n/a
Ensembl	ENSG00000260630	n/a
UniProt	n a	n/a
RefSeq (mRNA)	NM_144986	n/a
RefSeq (protein)	n/a	n/a
Location (UCSC)	Chr 16: 88.66 – 88.69 Mb	n/a
PubMed search		n/a
- Wikidata
View/Edit Human

SNAI3 antisense RNA 1 is a non-coding RNA that in humans is encoded by the SNAI3-AS1 gene.
