= WFDC1 =

Protein-coding gene in the species Homo sapiens

Identifiers
- Aliases: WFDC1, PS20, WAP four-disulfide core domain 1
- External IDs: OMIM: 605322; MGI: 1915116; GeneCards: WFDC1

Gene location (Human)
Chr.	Chromosome 16 (human)
Band	16q24.1	Start	84,294,846 bp
Band	16q24.1	End	84,329,844 bp

Gene location (Mouse)
Chr.	Chromosome 8 (mouse)
Band	8|8 E1	Start	120,393,104 bp
Band	8|8 E1	End	120,414,961 bp
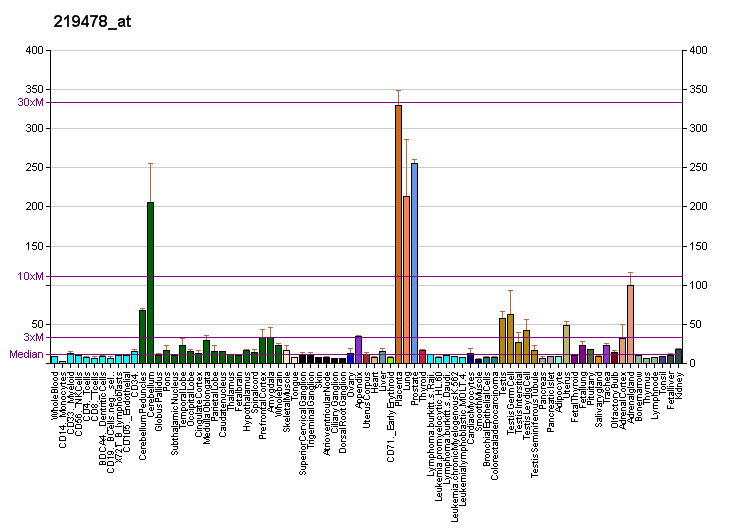
RNA expression pattern
Bgee	Human / Mouse (ortholog); Top expressed in: saphenous vein; right coronary artery; seminal vesicula; retinal pigment epithelium; nipple; popliteal artery; tibial arteries; urethra; cardia; mucosa of urinary bladder / Top expressed in: temporal muscle; muscle of thigh; triceps brachii muscle; skeletal muscle tissue; sternocleidomastoid muscle; digastric muscle; medial head of gastrocnemius muscle; soleus muscle; quadriceps femoris muscle; lens; More reference expression data
BioGPS	More reference expression data
Gene ontology
Molecular function	peptidase inhibitor activity; serine-type endopeptidase inhibitor activity; molecular function
Cellular component	extracellular region; extracellular space
Biological process	negative regulation of wound healing; negative regulation of peptidase activity; response to estradiol; negative regulation of inflammatory response; negative regulation of cell growth; regulation of cell growth; negative regulation of endopeptidase activity; negative regulation of epithelial cell proliferation
Sources:Amigo / QuickGO
Orthologs
Databases	NCBI: entry; OMA: entry
Species	Human	Mouse
Entrez	58189	67866
Ensembl	ENSG00000103175	ENSMUSG00000023336
UniProt	Q9HC57	Q9ESH5
RefSeq (mRNA)	NM_001282466; NM_001282467; NM_021197	NM_023395
RefSeq (protein)	NP_001269395; NP_001269396; NP_067020	NP_075884
Location (UCSC)	Chr 16: 84.29 – 84.33 Mb	Chr 8: 120.39 – 120.41 Mb
PubMed search
- Wikidata
View/Edit Human	View/Edit Mouse

WAP four-disulfide core domain protein 1 is a protein that in humans is encoded by the WFDC1 gene.

This gene encodes a member of the WAP-type four disulfide core domain family. The WAP-type four-disulfide core domain, or WAP signature motif, contains eight cysteines forming four disulfide bonds at the core of the protein, and functions as a protease inhibitor in many family members. The encoded protein shares 81% amino acid identity with the rat ps20 protein, which was originally identified as a secreted growth inhibitor. This gene is mapped to chromosome 16q24, an area of frequent loss of heterozygosity in cancers, including prostate, breast and hepatocellular cancers and Wilms' tumor. Owing to its location and a possible growth inhibitory property of its gene product, this gene is suggested to be a tumor suppressor gene.
