= SHCBP1 =

Protein-coding gene in the species Homo sapiens

Identifiers
- Aliases: SHCBP1, PAL, SHC binding and spindle associated 1
- External IDs: OMIM: 611027; MGI: 1338802; HomoloGene: 32123; GeneCards: SHCBP1; OMA:SHCBP1 - orthologs

Gene location (Human)
Chr.	Chromosome 16 (human)
Band	16q11.2	Start	46,578,591 bp
Band	16q11.2	End	46,621,379 bp

Gene location (Mouse)
Chr.	Chromosome 8 (mouse)
Band	8|8 A1.1	Start	4,785,976 bp
Band	8|8 A1.1	End	4,829,567 bp
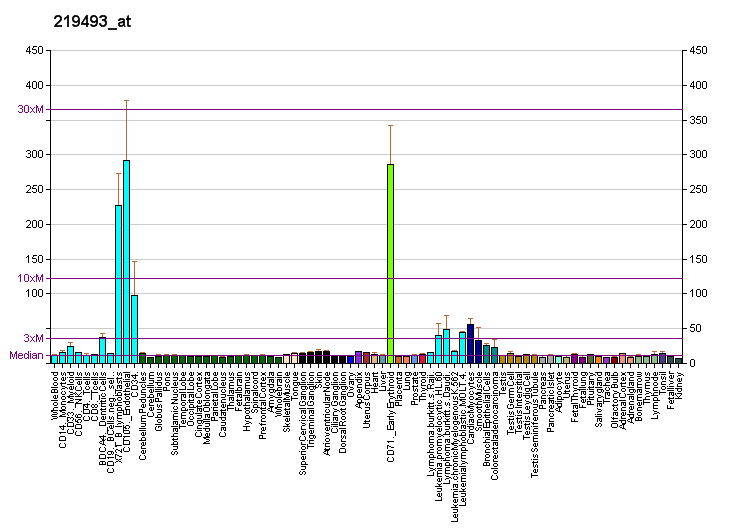
RNA expression pattern
Bgee	Human / Mouse (ortholog); Top expressed in: secondary oocyte; ventricular zone; bone marrow; gonad; ganglionic eminence; trabecular bone; stromal cell of endometrium; bone marrow cells; appendix; testicle / Top expressed in: otic placode; otic vesicle; saccule; primitive streak; maxillary prominence; mandibular prominence; abdominal wall; condyle; vas deferens; dermis; More reference expression data
BioGPS	More reference expression data
Gene ontology
Molecular function	SH2 domain binding; protein binding
Cellular component	cytoskeleton; cytoplasm; spindle; midbody
Biological process	regulation of neural precursor cell proliferation; fibroblast growth factor receptor signaling pathway
Sources:Amigo / QuickGO
Orthologs
Species	Human	Mouse
Entrez	79801	20419
Ensembl	ENSG00000171241	ENSMUSG00000022322
UniProt	Q8NEM2	Q9Z179
RefSeq (mRNA)	NM_024745; NM_001324318; NM_001324319	NM_011369
RefSeq (protein)	NP_001311247; NP_001311248; NP_079021	NP_035499
Location (UCSC)	Chr 16: 46.58 – 46.62 Mb	Chr 8: 4.79 – 4.83 Mb
PubMed search
- Wikidata
View/Edit Human	View/Edit Mouse

SHC SH2 domain-binding protein 1 is a protein that in humans is encoded by the SHCBP1 gene.

== Interactions ==
SHCBP1 has been shown to interact with SHC1.
