= Alpha-hemoglobin-stabilizing protein =

Protein found in humans

AHSP
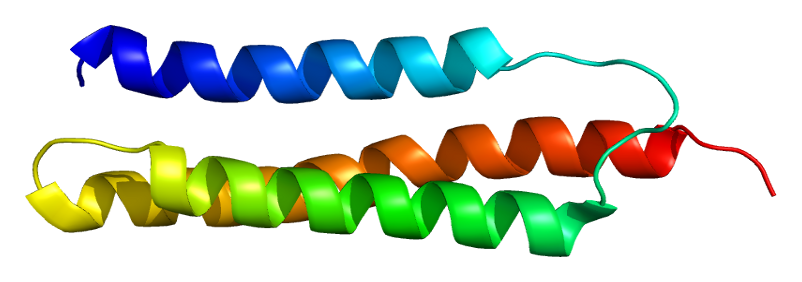

Identifiers
- Aliases: AHSP, EDRF, ERAF, alpha hemoglobin stabilizing protein
- External IDs: OMIM: 605821; GeneCards: AHSP
Available structures
PDB	Human UniProt search: PDBe RCSB
PDB	List of PDB id codes 1W09, 1W0A, 1W0B, 1XZY, 1Y01, 1Z8U, 3IA3, 3OVU

Gene location (Human)
Chr.	Chromosome 16 (human)
Band	16p11.2	Start	31,527,900 bp
Band	16p11.2	End	31,528,803 bp
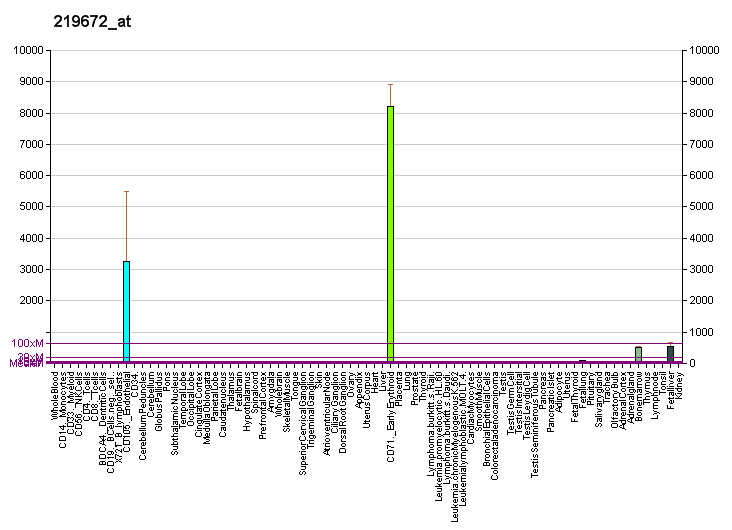
RNA expression pattern
Bgee	Human / Mouse (ortholog); Top expressed in: trabecular bone; bone marrow cell; monocyte; blood; testicle; spleen; placenta; embryo; ganglionic eminence; right testis / n/a; More reference expression data
BioGPS	More reference expression data
Gene ontology
Molecular function	unfolded protein binding; hemoglobin binding; protein binding
Cellular component	cytoplasm; hemoglobin complex
Biological process	protein stabilization; protein folding; erythrocyte differentiation; hemoglobin metabolic process; hemopoiesis
Sources:Amigo / QuickGO
Orthologs
Databases	NCBI: entry; OMA: entry
Species	Human	Mouse
Entrez	51327	n/a
Ensembl	ENSG00000169877	n/a
UniProt	Q9NZD4	n/a
RefSeq (mRNA)	NM_016633; NM_001318221; NM_001318222	n/a
RefSeq (protein)	NP_001305150; NP_001305151; NP_057717	n/a
Location (UCSC)	Chr 16: 31.53 – 31.53 Mb	n/a
PubMed search		n/a
- Wikidata
View/Edit Human

Alpha-hemoglobin-stabilizing protein is a protein that in humans is encoded by the AHSP gene (previously ERAF). This protein binds to free alpha hemoglobin, and chaperones it until it binds to beta hemoglobin to form a heterodimer.
