= Structure-specific endonuclease subunit SLX1B =

Protein-coding gene in the species Homo sapiens

SLX1B

Identifiers
- Aliases: SLX1B, GIYD2, Slx1 structure-specific endonuclease subunit homolog b, SLX1 homolog B, structure-specific endonuclease subunit
- External IDs: OMIM: 615823; MGI: 1915220; GeneCards: SLX1B

Gene location (Human)
Chr.	Chromosome 16 (human)
Band	16p11.2	Start	29,454,501 bp
Band	16p11.2	End	29,458,219 bp

Gene location (Mouse)
Chr.	Chromosome 7 (mouse)
Band	7|7 F3	Start	126,288,640 bp
Band	7|7 F3	End	126,294,956 bp
RNA expression pattern
Bgee	Human / Mouse (ortholog); Top expressed in: duodenum; monocyte; appendix; placenta; ventricular zone; bone marrow cell; blood; muscle of thigh; ganglionic eminence; stromal cell of endometrium / Top expressed in: neural layer of retina; lumbar subsegment of spinal cord; aortic valve; morula; ascending aorta; ventricular zone; yolk sac; lens; superior frontal gyrus; granulocyte; More reference expression data
BioGPS	n/a
Gene ontology
Molecular function	nuclease activity; endonuclease activity; protein binding; hydrolase activity; metal ion binding; 5'-flap endonuclease activity; endodeoxyribonuclease activity; crossover junction endodeoxyribonuclease activity
Cellular component	nucleus; nucleoplasm; Slx1-Slx4 complex
Biological process	DNA double-strand break processing involved in repair via single-strand annealing; cellular response to DNA damage stimulus; DNA recombination; interstrand cross-link repair; positive regulation of t-circle formation; nucleic acid phosphodiester bond hydrolysis; DNA repair; double-strand break repair via homologous recombination; telomere maintenance via telomere lengthening; t-circle formation; negative regulation of telomere maintenance via telomere lengthening; telomeric D-loop disassembly
Sources:Amigo / QuickGO
Orthologs
Databases	NCBI: entry; OMA: entry
Species	Human	Mouse
Entrez	79008	75764
Ensembl	ENSG00000181625	ENSMUSG00000059772
UniProt	Q9BQ83	Q8BX32
RefSeq (mRNA)	NM_178044; NM_024044; NM_001400286; NM_001400287	NM_029420
RefSeq (protein)	NP_001014999; NP_001015000	NP_083696
Location (UCSC)	Chr 16: 29.45 – 29.46 Mb	Chr 7: 126.29 – 126.29 Mb
PubMed search
- Wikidata
View/Edit Human	View/Edit Mouse

Structure-specific endonuclease subunit SLX1B is a protein in humans that is encoded by the SLX1B gene. The nearby gene, SLX1A, encodes an identical protein, and the protein is sometimes called structure-specific endonuclease subunit SLX1 when not specifying the origin gene.

This gene encodes a protein that is an important regulator of genome stability. The protein represents the catalytic subunit of the SLX1-SLX4 structure-specific endonuclease, which can resolve DNA secondary structures that are formed during repair and recombination processes. Two identical copies of this gene are located on the p arm of chromosome 16 due to a segmental duplication; this record represents the more telomeric copy. Alternative splicing results in multiple transcript variants. Read-through transcription also occurs between this gene and the downstream SULT1A4 (sulfotransferase family, cytosolic, 1A, phenol-preferring, member 4) gene. [provided by RefSeq, Nov 2010].
