= Zinc finger protein 200 =

Protein found in humans

ZNF200

Identifiers
- Aliases: ZNF200, zinc finger protein 200
- External IDs: OMIM: 603231; GeneCards: ZNF200

Gene location (Human)
Chr.	Chromosome 16 (human)
Band	16p13.3	Start	3,222,325 bp
Band	16p13.3	End	3,236,221 bp
RNA expression pattern
Bgee	Human / Mouse (ortholog); Top expressed in: secondary oocyte; gonad; sperm; testicle; right testis; left testis; blood; granulocyte; endothelial cell; germinal epithelium / n/a; More reference expression data
BioGPS	n/a
Gene ontology
Molecular function	metal ion binding; nucleic acid binding; molecular function; DNA-binding transcription factor activity, RNA polymerase II-specific
Cellular component	nucleus
Biological process	regulation of transcription, DNA-templated; transcription, DNA-templated; biological process; regulation of transcription by RNA polymerase II
Sources:Amigo / QuickGO
Orthologs
Databases	NCBI: entry; OMA: entry
Species	Human	Mouse
Entrez	7752	n/a
Ensembl	ENSG00000010539	n/a
UniProt	P98182	n/a
RefSeq (mRNA)	NM_001145446; NM_001145447; NM_001145448; NM_003454; NM_198087 NM_198088	n/a
RefSeq (protein)	NP_001138918; NP_001138919; NP_001138920; NP_003445; NP_932353 NP_932354	n/a
Location (UCSC)	Chr 16: 3.22 – 3.24 Mb	n/a
PubMed search		n/a
- Wikidata
View/Edit Human

Zinc finger protein 200 is a protein that in humans is encoded by the ZNF200 gene.
