= HBAP1 =

Pseudogene in the species Homo sapiens

Identifiers
- Aliases: HBAP1, HBA-T1, HBA3, HBA3P, hemoglobin subunit alpha pseudogene 1
- External IDs: GeneCards: HBAP1

Gene location (Human)
Chr.	Chromosome 16 (human)
Band	16p13.3	Start	168,679 bp
Band	16p13.3	End	169,334 bp
RNA expression pattern
Bgee	Human / Mouse (ortholog); Top expressed in: bone marrow; blood; cell; prefrontal cortex; superior frontal gyrus; monocyte; Brodmann area 9; right frontal lobe; caudate nucleus; upper lobe of left lung / n/a; More reference expression data
BioGPS	n/a
Orthologs
Databases	NCBI: entry; OMA: entry
Species	Human	Mouse
Entrez	3041	n/a
Ensembl	ENSG00000225323	n/a
UniProt	n a	n/a
RefSeq (mRNA)	n/a	n/a
RefSeq (protein)	n/a	n/a
Location (UCSC)	Chr 16: 0.17 – 0.17 Mb	n/a
PubMed search		n/a
- Wikidata
View/Edit Human

Hemoglobin, alpha pseudogene 1, also known as HBAP1, is a human gene.
