= ZG16B =

Protein-coding gene in the species Homo sapiens

Identifiers
- Aliases: ZG16B, EECP, HRPE773, JCLN2, PAUF, PRO1567, LOC124220, zymogen granule protein 16B
- External IDs: HomoloGene: 51661; GeneCards: ZG16B; OMA:ZG16B - orthologs
Available structures
PDB	Human UniProt search: PDBe RCSB
PDB	List of PDB id codes 3AQG

Gene location (Human)
Chr.	Chromosome 16 (human)
Band	16p13.3	Start	2,830,253 bp
Band	16p13.3	End	2,839,585 bp
RNA expression pattern
Bgee	Human / Mouse (ortholog); Top expressed in: olfactory zone of nasal mucosa; salivary gland; minor salivary glands; gallbladder; prostate; rectum; skin of abdomen; skin of leg; mucosa of transverse colon; tonsil / n/a; More reference expression data
BioGPS	n/a
Gene ontology
Molecular function	carbohydrate binding; molecular function
Cellular component	extracellular region; extracellular exosome; extracellular space
Biological process	retina homeostasis
Sources:Amigo / QuickGO
Orthologs
Species	Human	Mouse
Entrez	124220	n/a
Ensembl	ENSG00000283056; ENSG00000162078	n/a
UniProt	Q96DA0	n/a
RefSeq (mRNA)	NM_145252	n/a
RefSeq (protein)	NP_660295	n/a
Location (UCSC)	Chr 16: 2.83 – 2.84 Mb	n/a
PubMed search		n/a
- Wikidata
View/Edit Human

Pancreatic adenocarcinoma up-regulated factor (also called Zymogen granule protein 16 homolog B) is a protein that in humans is encoded by the ZG16B gene. It is predicted to function as a lectin, meaning it binds to carbohydrates
