= Zinc finger protein 263 =

Mammalian protein found in humans

ZNF263

Identifiers
- Aliases: ZNF263, FPM315, ZKSCAN12, ZSCAN44, zinc finger protein 263
- External IDs: OMIM: 604191; MGI: 1921370; GeneCards: ZNF263

Gene location (Human)
Chr.	Chromosome 16 (human)
Band	16p13.3	Start	3,263,800 bp
Band	16p13.3	End	3,301,401 bp

Gene location (Mouse)
Chr.	Chromosome 16 (mouse)
Band	16 A1|16 2.2 cM	Start	3,561,957 bp
Band	16 A1|16 2.2 cM	End	3,568,654 bp
RNA expression pattern
Bgee	Human / Mouse (ortholog); Top expressed in: Achilles tendon; granulocyte; left ovary; left uterine tube; right ovary; sural nerve; right uterine tube; ventricular zone; gastric mucosa; ganglionic eminence / Top expressed in: Rostral migratory stream; hand; otolith organ; utricle; Paneth cell; mesenteric lymph nodes; cervix; cumulus cell; lobe of prostate; blood; More reference expression data
BioGPS	n/a
Gene ontology
Molecular function	DNA-binding transcription factor activity; DNA binding; protein binding; metal ion binding; nucleic acid binding; DNA-binding transcription repressor activity, RNA polymerase II-specific; sequence-specific DNA binding; DNA-binding transcription factor activity, RNA polymerase II-specific
Cellular component	intracellular anatomical structure; nucleus
Biological process	regulation of transcription, DNA-templated; transcription, DNA-templated; negative regulation of transcription by RNA polymerase II; negative regulation of transcription, DNA-templated
Sources:Amigo / QuickGO
Orthologs
Databases	NCBI: entry; OMA: entry
Species	Human	Mouse
Entrez	10127	74120
Ensembl	ENSG00000006194	ENSMUSG00000022529
UniProt	O14978	Q8CF60
RefSeq (mRNA)	NM_005741	NM_148924
RefSeq (protein)	NP_005732	NP_683726
Location (UCSC)	Chr 16: 3.26 – 3.3 Mb	Chr 16: 3.56 – 3.57 Mb
PubMed search
- Wikidata
View/Edit Human	View/Edit Mouse

Zinc finger protein 263 is a protein that in humans is encoded by the ZNF263 gene.
