= RNA exonuclease 5 =

Human gene

REXO5

Identifiers
- Aliases: REXO5, LOC81691, RNA exonuclease 5, NEF-sp
- External IDs: MGI: 1919402; HomoloGene: 12803; GeneCards: REXO5; OMA:REXO5 - orthologs

Gene location (Human)
Chr.	Chromosome 16 (human)
Band	16p12.3	Start	20,806,429 bp
Band	16p12.3	End	20,849,665 bp

Gene location (Mouse)
Chr.	Chromosome 7 (mouse)
Band	7|7 F2	Start	119,794,006 bp
Band	7|7 F2	End	119,848,943 bp
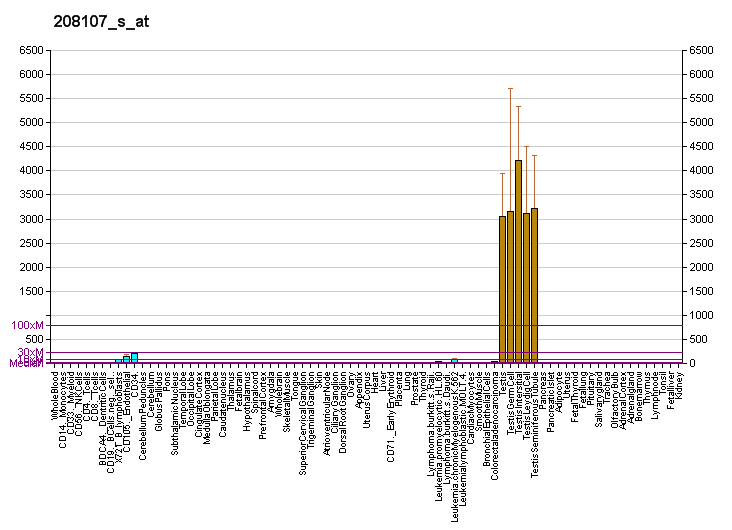

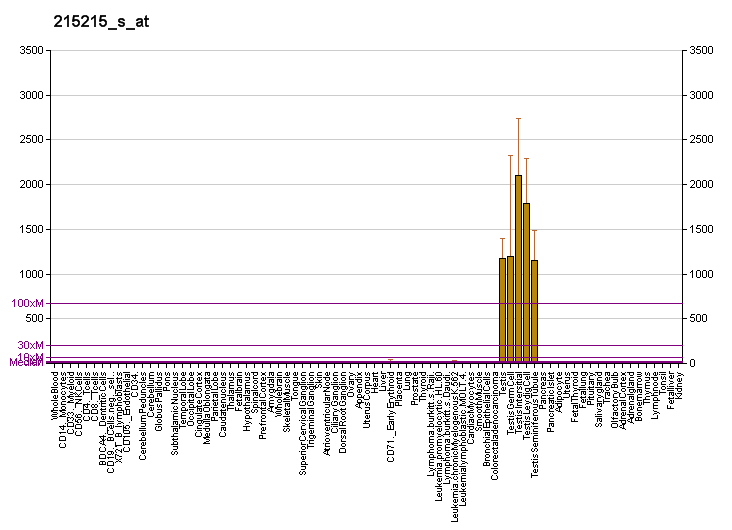
RNA expression pattern
Bgee	Human / Mouse (ortholog); Top expressed in: left testis; right testis; male germ cell; sperm; testicle; gonad; ventricular zone; ganglionic eminence; body of stomach; right uterine tube / Top expressed in: spermatocyte; seminiferous tubule; spermatid; Paneth cell; genital tubercle; medullary collecting duct; fossa; condyle; otolith organ; tail of embryo; More reference expression data
BioGPS	More reference expression data
Gene ontology
Molecular function	nuclease activity; exonuclease activity; hydrolase activity; RNA binding; nucleic acid binding
Cellular component	nucleolus; extracellular exosome; nucleus
Biological process	nucleic acid phosphodiester bond hydrolysis
Sources:Amigo / QuickGO
Orthologs
Species	Human	Mouse
Entrez	81691	434234
Ensembl	ENSG00000005189	ENSMUSG00000030924
UniProt	Q96IC2	n/a
RefSeq (mRNA)	NM_001144924; NM_001199053; NM_030941	NM_001004187; NM_028129
RefSeq (protein)	NP_001138396; NP_001185982; NP_112203	n/a
Location (UCSC)	Chr 16: 20.81 – 20.85 Mb	Chr 7: 119.79 – 119.85 Mb
PubMed search
- Wikidata
View/Edit Human	View/Edit Mouse

RNA exonuclease 5 is a protein that in humans is encoded by the gene REXO5 (previously LOC81691). Not much has been reported about the function of this protein, but it is predicted to participate in ribosomal RNA (3’ end) processing.
