= OGFOD1 =

Protein-coding gene in the species Homo sapiens

Identifiers
- Aliases: OGFOD1, TPA1, 2-oxoglutarate and iron dependent oxygenase domain containing 1
- External IDs: OMIM: 615857; MGI: 2442978; GeneCards: OGFOD1
Available structures
PDB	Ortholog search: PDBe RCSB
PDB	List of PDB id codes 4NHX, 4NHY

Gene location (Human)
Chr.	Chromosome 16 (human)
Band	16q13	Start	56,451,521 bp
Band	16q13	End	56,479,104 bp

Gene location (Mouse)
Chr.	Chromosome 8 (mouse)
Band	8|8 C5	Start	94,763,826 bp
Band	8|8 C5	End	94,794,549 bp
RNA expression pattern
Bgee	Human / Mouse (ortholog); Top expressed in: oocyte; gastrocnemius muscle; secondary oocyte; biceps brachii; muscle of thigh; tibialis anterior muscle; Skeletal muscle tissue of biceps brachii; deltoid muscle; gingival epithelium; vastus lateralis muscle / Top expressed in: ventromedial nucleus; central gray substance of midbrain; paraventricular nucleus of hypothalamus; lateral hypothalamus; dentate gyrus of hippocampal formation granule cell; superior colliculus; ventral tegmental area; Region I of hippocampus proper; anterior amygdaloid area; dorsomedial hypothalamic nucleus; More reference expression data
BioGPS	n/a
Gene ontology
Molecular function	2-oxoglutarate-dependent dioxygenase activity; L-ascorbic acid binding; iron ion binding; oxidoreductase activity; dioxygenase activity; oxidoreductase activity, acting on paired donors, with incorporation or reduction of molecular oxygen; peptidyl-proline dioxygenase activity; peptidyl-proline 3-dioxygenase activity; metal ion binding
Cellular component	cytoplasmic stress granule; nucleus; cytoplasm; cytosol
Biological process	regulation of translational termination; cell population proliferation; peptidyl-proline hydroxylation; protein hydroxylation; stress granule assembly
Sources:Amigo / QuickGO
Orthologs
Databases	NCBI: entry; OMA: entry
Species	Human	Mouse
Entrez	55239	270086
Ensembl	ENSG00000087263	ENSMUSG00000033009
UniProt	Q8N543	Q3U0K8
RefSeq (mRNA)	NM_018233; NM_001324357; NM_001324358; NM_001324359; NM_001324360 NM_001324361; NM_001324362; NM_001324363	NM_001093757; NM_177767
RefSeq (protein)	NP_001311286; NP_001311287; NP_001311288; NP_001311289; NP_001311290 NP_001311291; NP_001311292; NP_060703	NP_001087226; NP_808435
Location (UCSC)	Chr 16: 56.45 – 56.48 Mb	Chr 8: 94.76 – 94.79 Mb
PubMed search
- Wikidata
View/Edit Human	View/Edit Mouse

2-oxoglutarate and iron-dependent oxygenase domain containing 1, also known as OGFOD1, is a human gene.
