= ZNF23 =

Protein-coding gene in the species Homo sapiens

Identifiers
- Aliases: ZNF23, KOX16, ZNF359, ZNF612, Zfp612, zinc finger protein 23
- External IDs: OMIM: 194527; MGI: 2443465; GeneCards: ZNF23

Gene location (Human)
Chr.	Chromosome 16 (human)
Band	16q22.2	Start	71,447,597 bp
Band	16q22.2	End	71,463,095 bp

Gene location (Mouse)
Chr.	Chromosome 8 (mouse)
Band	8|8 D3	Start	110,806,378 bp
Band	8|8 D3	End	110,819,373 bp
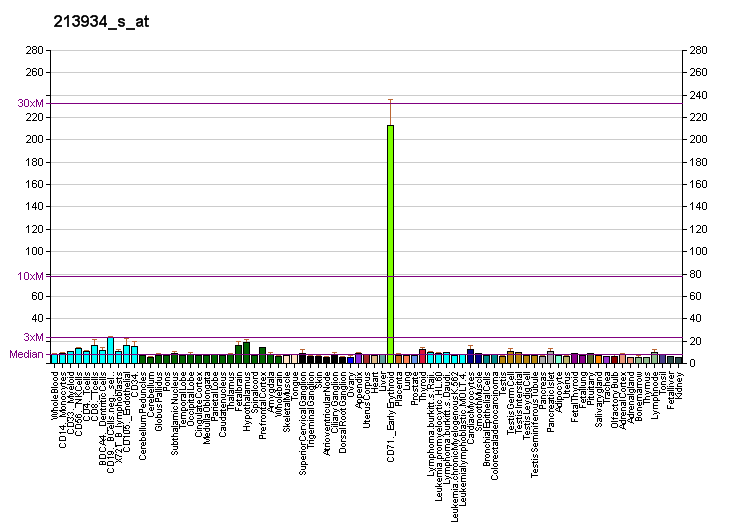
RNA expression pattern
Bgee	Human / Mouse (ortholog); Top expressed in: gonad; pituitary gland; anterior pituitary; right uterine tube; ganglionic eminence; cerebellar hemisphere; sural nerve; testicle; right hemisphere of cerebellum; hypothalamus / Top expressed in: pontine nuclei; Rostral migratory stream; ventral tegmental area; medial vestibular nucleus; paraventricular nucleus of hypothalamus; lateral hypothalamus; substantia nigra; dorsal tegmental nucleus; dorsomedial hypothalamic nucleus; arcuate nucleus; More reference expression data
BioGPS	More reference expression data
Gene ontology
Molecular function	DNA-binding transcription factor activity; DNA binding; metal ion binding; nucleic acid binding; protein binding; DNA-binding transcription factor activity, RNA polymerase II-specific
Cellular component	intracellular anatomical structure; nucleus
Biological process	regulation of transcription, DNA-templated; transcription, DNA-templated; regulation of transcription by RNA polymerase II
Sources:Amigo / QuickGO
Orthologs
Databases	NCBI: entry; OMA: entry
Species	Human	Mouse
Entrez	7571	234725
Ensembl	ENSG00000167377	ENSMUSG00000044676
UniProt	P17027	n/a
RefSeq (mRNA)	NM_145911; NM_001304492; NM_001304493; NM_001304494	NM_175480
RefSeq (protein)	NP_001291421; NP_001291422; NP_001291423; NP_666016; NP_001368894 NP_001368895; NP_001368896; NP_001368897; NP_001368898; NP_001368899; NP_001368900; NP_001368901; NP_001368902; NP_001368903; NP_001368904; NP_001368905; NP_001368906; NP_001368907; NP_001368908; NP_001368909; NP_001368910; NP_001368913	n/a
Location (UCSC)	Chr 16: 71.45 – 71.46 Mb	Chr 8: 110.81 – 110.82 Mb
PubMed search
- Wikidata
View/Edit Human	View/Edit Mouse

Zinc finger protein 23 is a protein that in humans is encoded by the ZNF23 gene.
