= FBRS =

Protein-coding gene in the species Homo sapiens

Identifiers
- Aliases: FBRS, FBS, FBS1, fibrosin
- External IDs: OMIM: 608601; MGI: 104648; HomoloGene: 79554; GeneCards: FBRS; OMA:FBRS - orthologs

Gene location (Human)
Chr.	Chromosome 16 (human)
Band	16p11.2	Start	30,658,431 bp
Band	16p11.2	End	30,670,810 bp

Gene location (Mouse)
Chr.	Chromosome 7 (mouse)
Band	7|7 F3	Start	127,078,371 bp
Band	7|7 F3	End	127,090,883 bp
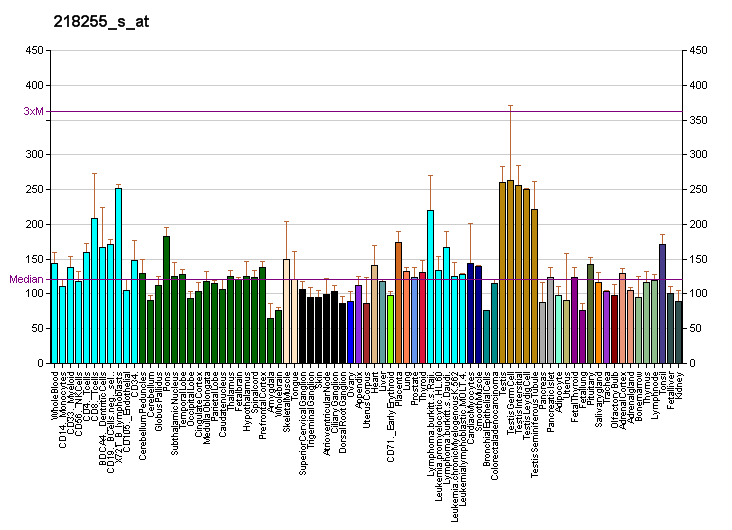
RNA expression pattern
Bgee	Human / Mouse (ortholog); Top expressed in: left testis; right testis; right uterine tube; anterior pituitary; granulocyte; right lobe of thyroid gland; skin of leg; cerebellar vermis; left lobe of thyroid gland; gastric mucosa / Top expressed in: granulocyte; zygote; secondary oocyte; thymus; spleen; primary oocyte; lip; adrenal gland; esophagus; bone marrow; More reference expression data
BioGPS	More reference expression data
Gene ontology
Molecular function	growth factor activity
Cellular component	extracellular space
Biological process	positive regulation of fibroblast proliferation; regulation of signaling receptor activity
Sources:Amigo / QuickGO
Orthologs
Species	Human	Mouse
Entrez	64319	14123
Ensembl	ENSG00000156860	ENSMUSG00000042423
UniProt	Q9HAH7	Q8R089
RefSeq (mRNA)	NM_001105079; NM_022452	NM_010183
RefSeq (protein)	NP_001098549	NP_034313
Location (UCSC)	Chr 16: 30.66 – 30.67 Mb	Chr 7: 127.08 – 127.09 Mb
PubMed search
- Wikidata
View/Edit Human	View/Edit Mouse

Probable fibrosin-1 long transcript protein is a protein that in humans is encoded by the FBRS gene.

Fibrosin is a lymphokine secreted by activated lymphocytes that induces fibroblast proliferation (Prakash and Robbins, 1998).
