= PMFBP1 =

Protein-coding gene in the species Homo sapiens

Identifiers
- Aliases: PMFBP1, polyamine modulated factor 1 binding protein 1, STAP, SPGF31
- External IDs: OMIM: 618085; MGI: 1930136; HomoloGene: 23182; GeneCards: PMFBP1; OMA:PMFBP1 - orthologs

Gene location (Human)
| Chr. | Chromosome 16 (human) |
| Band | 16q22.2 | Start | 72,112,157 bp |
| Band | 16q22.2 | End | 72,176,878 bp |

Gene location (Mouse)
| Chr. | Chromosome 8 (mouse) |
| Band | 8 D3|8 57.05 cM | Start | 110,220,659 bp |
| Band | 8 D3|8 57.05 cM | End | 110,269,272 bp |
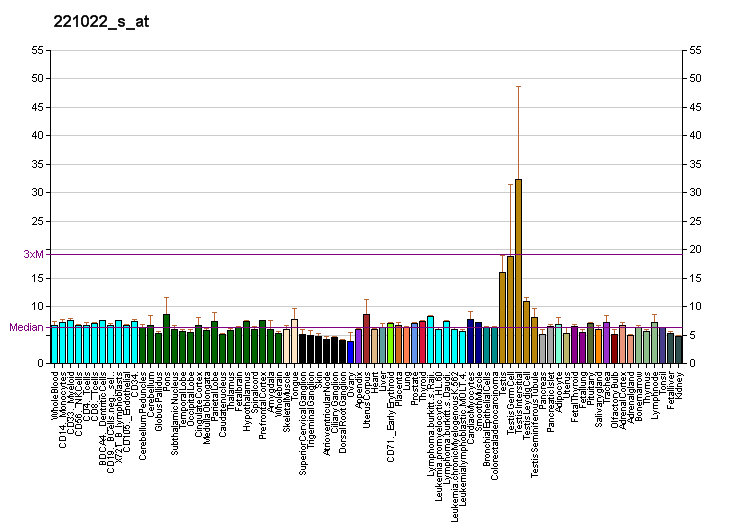
RNA expression pattern
| Bgee | Human / Mouse (ortholog); Top expressed in: sperm; right testis; left testis; testicle; gonad; tail of epididymis; mucosa of transverse colon; apex of heart; body of pancreas; granulocyte / Top expressed in: seminiferous tubule; spermatid; lumbar spinal ganglion; spermatocyte; morula; embryo; secondary oocyte; zygote; primary oocyte; tibiofemoral joint; More reference expression data |
| BioGPS | More reference expression data |
Gene ontology
| Molecular function | molecular function |
| Cellular component | cytoplasm; cilium; motile cilium; cell projection; sperm connecting piece |
| Biological process | biological process; spermatogenesis |
Sources:Amigo / QuickGO
Orthologs
| Species | Human | Mouse |
| Entrez | 83449 | 56523 |
| Ensembl | ENSG00000118557 | ENSMUSG00000031727 |
| UniProt | Q8TBY8 | Q9WVQ0 |
| RefSeq (mRNA) | NM_001160213; NM_031293 | NM_019938 |
| RefSeq (protein) | NP_001153685; NP_112583 | NP_064322 |
| Location (UCSC) | Chr 16: 72.11 – 72.18 Mb | Chr 8: 110.22 – 110.27 Mb |
| PubMed search |
- Wikidata
| View/Edit Human | View/Edit Mouse |

Polyamine-modulated factor 1-binding protein 1 is a protein that is encoded in humans by the PMFBP1 gene.
