= GLG1 =

Protein-coding gene in the species Homo sapiens

Identifiers
- Aliases: GLG1, CFR-1, ESL-1, MG-160, MG160, golgi glycoprotein 1
- External IDs: OMIM: 600753; MGI: 104967; HomoloGene: 7533; GeneCards: GLG1; OMA:GLG1 - orthologs

Gene location (Human)
Chr.	Chromosome 16 (human)
Band	16q23.1	Start	74,447,427 bp
Band	16q23.1	End	74,607,144 bp

Gene location (Mouse)
Chr.	Chromosome 8 (mouse)
Band	8 E1|8 57.98 cM	Start	111,881,053 bp
Band	8 E1|8 57.98 cM	End	111,985,848 bp
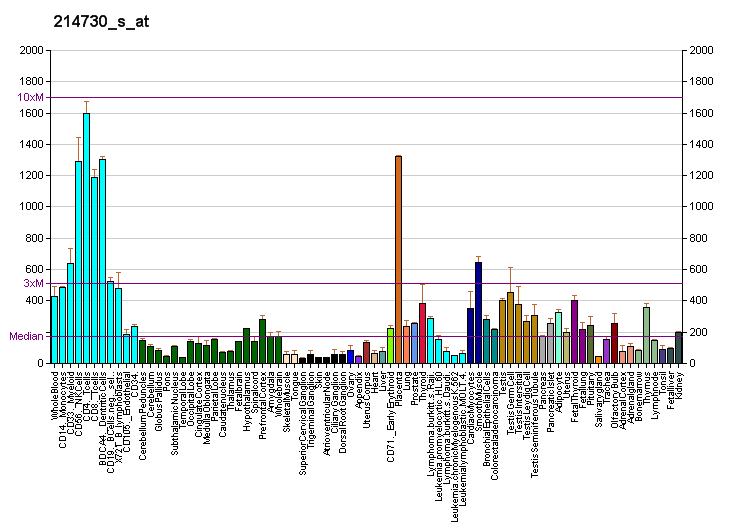
RNA expression pattern
Bgee	Human / Mouse (ortholog); Top expressed in: stromal cell of endometrium; renal medulla; nipple; tibia; pylorus; cardia; external globus pallidus; corpus callosum; ventral tegmental area; spinal ganglia / Top expressed in: efferent ductule; calvaria; epithelium of lens; Rostral migratory stream; internal carotid artery; ciliary body; central gray substance of midbrain; lacrimal gland; right ventricle; stroma of bone marrow; More reference expression data
BioGPS	More reference expression data
Gene ontology
Molecular function	fibroblast growth factor binding; signaling receptor binding
Cellular component	integral component of membrane; plasma membrane; Golgi apparatus; extracellular exosome; membrane; Golgi membrane; extracellular matrix
Biological process	bone morphogenesis; negative regulation of protein processing; regulation of chondrocyte differentiation; negative regulation of transforming growth factor beta receptor signaling pathway; leukocyte migration
Sources:Amigo / QuickGO
Orthologs
Species	Human	Mouse
Entrez	2734	20340
Ensembl	ENSG00000090863	ENSMUSG00000003316
UniProt	Q92896	Q61543
RefSeq (mRNA)	NM_001145666; NM_001145667; NM_012201	NM_009149; NM_001368315
RefSeq (protein)	NP_001139138; NP_001139139; NP_036333	NP_033175; NP_001355244
Location (UCSC)	Chr 16: 74.45 – 74.61 Mb	Chr 8: 111.88 – 111.99 Mb
PubMed search
- Wikidata
View/Edit Human	View/Edit Mouse

Golgi apparatus protein 1 is a protein that in humans is encoded by the GLG1 gene.
