= SRCAP =

Protein-coding gene in the species Homo sapiens

Identifiers
- Aliases: SRCAP, DOMO1, EAF1, FLHS, SWR1, Snf2-related CREBBP activator protein, Snf2 related CREBBP activator protein, DEHMBA
- External IDs: OMIM: 611421; MGI: 2444036; GeneCards: SRCAP

Gene location (Human)
Chr.	Chromosome 16 (human)
Band	16p11.2	Start	30,698,209 bp
Band	16p11.2	End	30,741,409 bp

Gene location (Mouse)
Chr.	Chromosome 7 (mouse)
Band	7|7 F3	Start	127,111,155 bp
Band	7|7 F3	End	127,160,391 bp
RNA expression pattern
Bgee	Human / Mouse (ortholog); Top expressed in: sural nerve; stromal cell of endometrium; granulocyte; epithelium of colon; appendix; body of uterus; gastric mucosa; apex of heart; gastrocnemius muscle; muscle of thigh / Top expressed in: genital tubercle; tail of embryo; neural layer of retina; zygote; Rostral migratory stream; dentate gyrus of hippocampal formation granule cell; lip; ventricular zone; primary visual cortex; muscle of thigh; More reference expression data
BioGPS	n/a
Gene ontology
Molecular function	DNA binding; transcription coactivator activity; nucleotide binding; protein binding; ATP binding; hydrolase activity; helicase activity; histone acetyltransferase activity; ATPase activity; histone binding
Cellular component	perinuclear region of cytoplasm; Golgi apparatus; nucleus; nucleoplasm; nuclear body; protein-containing complex; Swr1 complex
Biological process	regulation of transcription by RNA polymerase II; viral process; regulation of transcription, DNA-templated; transcription, DNA-templated; histone acetylation; chromatin organization; positive regulation of nucleic acid-templated transcription; chromatin remodeling; histone exchange
Sources:Amigo / QuickGO
Orthologs
Databases	NCBI: entry; OMA: entry
Species	Human	Mouse
Entrez	10847	100043597
Ensembl	ENSG00000080603	ENSMUSG00000053877
UniProt	Q6ZRS2	n/a
RefSeq (mRNA)	NM_006662	NM_001033881; NM_001304266; NM_175144; NM_178800
RefSeq (protein)	NP_006653	n/a
Location (UCSC)	Chr 16: 30.7 – 30.74 Mb	Chr 7: 127.11 – 127.16 Mb
PubMed search
- Wikidata
View/Edit Human	View/Edit Mouse

Helicase SRCAP is an enzyme that in humans is encoded by the SRCAP gene.
