= LINC00273 =

Non-coding RNA in the species Homo sapiens

Identifiers
- Aliases: LINC00273, NCRNA00273, TOP, long intergenic non-protein coding RNA 273
- External IDs: GeneCards: LINC00273; OMA:LINC00273 - orthologs

Gene location (Human)
Chr.	Chromosome 16 (human)
Band	16p11.2	Start	34,158,585 bp
Band	16p11.2	End	34,160,036 bp
RNA expression pattern
Bgee	Human / Mouse (ortholog); Top expressed in: sural nerve; bone marrow cell; epithelium of colon; tonsil; mucosa of transverse colon; gonad; muscle of thigh; skeletal muscle tissue; liver; blood / n/a; More reference expression data
BioGPS	n/a
Orthologs
Species	Human	Mouse
Entrez	649159	n/a
Ensembl	ENSG00000256642	n/a
UniProt	n a	n/a
RefSeq (mRNA)	NM_001040069	n/a
RefSeq (protein)	n/a	n/a
Location (UCSC)	Chr 16: 34.16 – 34.16 Mb	n/a
PubMed search		n/a
- Wikidata
View/Edit Human

Long intergenic non-protein coding RNA 273 is a lncRNA that in humans is encoded by the LINC00273 gene.
