= VAT1L =

Protein-coding gene in humans

Identifiers
- Aliases: VAT1L, vesicle amine transport 1 like
- External IDs: MGI: 2142534; GeneCards: VAT1L
Available structures
PDB	Ortholog search: PDBe RCSB
PDB	List of PDB id codes 4A27
Enzyme activity
EC #	BRENDA	ExPASy	KEGG	MetaCyc
1.6.5.5	↗	↗	↗	↗

Gene location (Human)
Chr.	Chromosome 16 (human)
Band	16q23.1	Start	77,788,564 bp
Band	16q23.1	End	77,980,107 bp

Gene location (Mouse)
Chr.	Chromosome 8 (mouse)
Band	8|8 E1	Start	114,932,352 bp
Band	8|8 E1	End	115,100,811 bp
RNA expression pattern
Bgee	Human / Mouse (ortholog); Top expressed in: retinal pigment epithelium; spinal ganglia; hypothalamus; ventricular zone; cerebellum; cerebellar cortex; superior vestibular nucleus; cerebellar hemisphere; myocardium of left ventricle; nucleus accumbens / Top expressed in: habenula; suprachiasmatic nucleus; arcuate nucleus; superior cervical ganglion; ventromedial nucleus; Epithelium of choroid plexus; dorsomedial hypothalamic nucleus; paraventricular nucleus of hypothalamus; lateral septal nucleus; median eminence; More reference expression data
BioGPS	n/a
Orthologs
Databases	NCBI: entry; OMA: entry
Species	Human	Mouse
Entrez	57687	270097
Ensembl	ENSG00000171724	ENSMUSG00000046844
UniProt	Q9HCJ6	Q80TB8
RefSeq (mRNA)	NM_020927	NM_173016
RefSeq (protein)	NP_065978	NP_766604
Location (UCSC)	Chr 16: 77.79 – 77.98 Mb	Chr 8: 114.93 – 115.1 Mb
PubMed search
- Wikidata
View/Edit Human	View/Edit Mouse

Putative NADPH-dependent quinone oxidoreductase VAT1L is a protein in humans that is encoded by the VAT1L gene.

In humans, the VAT1L gene is located on chromosome 16 locus q23.1. According to SAGE data, it is expressed mainly in the brain.
