= CFDP1 =

Protein-coding gene in humans

Identifiers
- Aliases: CFDP1, BCNT, BUCENTAUR, CENP-29, CP27, SWC5, Yeti, p97, craniofacial development protein 1
- External IDs: OMIM: 608108; MGI: 1344403; HomoloGene: 4611; GeneCards: CFDP1; OMA:CFDP1 - orthologs

Gene location (Human)
Chr.	Chromosome 16 (human)
Band	16q23.1	Start	75,293,698 bp
Band	16q23.1	End	75,433,503 bp

Gene location (Mouse)
Chr.	Chromosome 8 (mouse)
Band	8|8 E1	Start	111,768,491 bp
Band	8|8 E1	End	111,854,291 bp
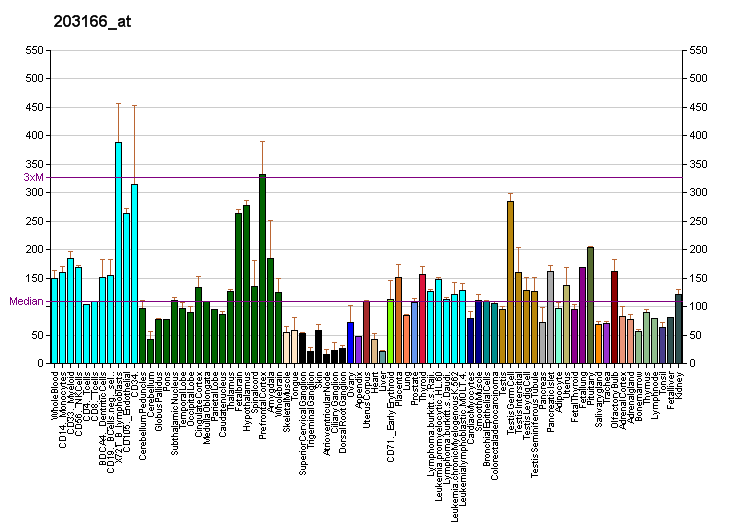
RNA expression pattern
Bgee	Human / Mouse (ortholog); Top expressed in: ganglionic eminence; Achilles tendon; ventricular zone; epithelium of colon; mucosa of transverse colon; right testis; tendon of biceps brachii; sural nerve; jejunal mucosa; left testis / Top expressed in: otic placode; saccule; otic vesicle; condyle; fossa; genital tubercle; medullary collecting duct; maxillary prominence; primitive streak; superior cervical ganglion; More reference expression data
BioGPS	More reference expression data
Gene ontology
Molecular function	molecular function
Cellular component	chromosome, centromeric region; kinetochore; chromosome; cellular component
Biological process	multicellular organism development; negative regulation of fibroblast apoptotic process; cell adhesion; regulation of cell population proliferation; regulation of cell shape; biological process
Sources:Amigo / QuickGO
Orthologs
Species	Human	Mouse
Entrez	10428	23837
Ensembl	ENSG00000153774	ENSMUSG00000031954
UniProt	Q9UEE9	O88271
RefSeq (mRNA)	NM_006324	NM_011801
RefSeq (protein)	NP_006315	NP_035931; NP_001355264; NP_001355265; NP_001355266; NP_001355267
Location (UCSC)	Chr 16: 75.29 – 75.43 Mb	Chr 8: 111.77 – 111.85 Mb
PubMed search
- Wikidata
View/Edit Human	View/Edit Mouse

Craniofacial development protein 1 is a protein that in humans is encoded by the CFDP1 gene.
