= DHX38 =

Protein-coding gene in the species Homo sapiens

Identifiers
- Aliases: DHX38, DDX38, PRP16, PRPF16, DEAH-box helicase 38, RP84
- External IDs: OMIM: 605584; MGI: 1927617; GeneCards: DHX38
Enzyme activity
EC #	BRENDA	ExPASy	KEGG	MetaCyc
3.6.4.13	↗	↗	↗	↗

Gene location (Human)
Chr.	Chromosome 16 (human)
Band	16q22.2	Start	72,093,613 bp
Band	16q22.2	End	72,112,912 bp

Gene location (Mouse)
Chr.	Chromosome 8 (mouse)
Band	8|8 D3	Start	110,274,643 bp
Band	8|8 D3	End	110,292,493 bp
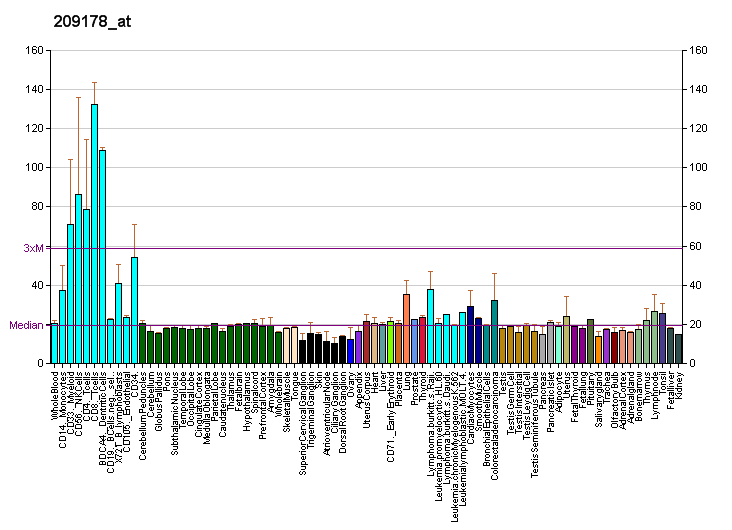
RNA expression pattern
Bgee	Human / Mouse (ortholog); Top expressed in: sural nerve; left ovary; right ovary; granulocyte; apex of heart; Achilles tendon; body of uterus; skin of leg; skin of abdomen; left uterine tube / Top expressed in: granulocyte; tail of embryo; zygote; neural layer of retina; ventricular zone; yolk sac; epiblast; secondary oocyte; spermatid; spermatocyte; More reference expression data
BioGPS	More reference expression data
Gene ontology
Molecular function	nucleotide binding; helicase activity; protein binding; nucleic acid binding; hydrolase activity; ATP binding; RNA binding; 3'-5' RNA helicase activity
Cellular component	catalytic step 2 spliceosome; membrane; nucleoplasm; spliceosomal complex; nucleus; cytoplasm
Biological process	mRNA splicing, via spliceosome; termination of RNA polymerase II transcription; mRNA processing; mRNA export from nucleus; mRNA 3'-end processing; RNA splicing; RNA export from nucleus
Sources:Amigo / QuickGO
Orthologs
Databases	NCBI: entry; OMA: entry
Species	Human	Mouse
Entrez	9785	64340
Ensembl	ENSG00000140829	ENSMUSG00000037993
UniProt	Q92620	Q80X98
RefSeq (mRNA)	NM_014003	NM_178380
RefSeq (protein)	NP_054722	NP_848467
Location (UCSC)	Chr 16: 72.09 – 72.11 Mb	Chr 8: 110.27 – 110.29 Mb
PubMed search
- Wikidata
View/Edit Human	View/Edit Mouse

Pre-mRNA-splicing factor ATP-dependent RNA helicase PRP16 is an enzyme that in humans is encoded by the DHX38 gene.

DEAD box proteins, characterized by the conserved motif Asp-Glu-Ala-Asp (DEAD), are putative RNA helicases. They are implicated in a number of cellular processes involving alteration of RNA secondary structure such as translation initiation, nuclear and mitochondrial splicing, and ribosome and spliceosome assembly. Based on their distribution patterns, some members of this family are believed to be involved in embryogenesis, spermatogenesis, and cellular growth and division. The protein encoded by this gene is a member of the DEAD/H box family of splicing factors. This protein resembles yeast Prp16 more closely than other DEAD/H family members. It is an ATPase and essential for the catalytic step II in pre-mRNA splicing process.
