= NOMO1 =

Protein-coding gene in the species Homo sapiens

Identifiers
- Aliases: NOMO1, Nomo, PM5, NODAL modulator 1
- External IDs: OMIM: 609157; MGI: 2385850; GeneCards: NOMO1

Gene location (Human)
Chr.	Chromosome 16 (human)
Band	16p13.11	Start	14,833,721 bp
Band	16p13.11	End	14,896,157 bp

Gene location (Mouse)
Chr.	Chromosome 7 (mouse)
Band	7 B3|7 29.66 cM	Start	45,683,122 bp
Band	7 B3|7 29.66 cM	End	45,733,636 bp
RNA expression pattern
Bgee	Human / Mouse (ortholog); Top expressed in: islet of Langerhans; superior frontal gyrus; body of pancreas; primary visual cortex; stromal cell of endometrium; corpus callosum; nucleus accumbens; right auricle of heart; Brodmann area 9; Achilles tendon / Top expressed in: otic placode; saccule; entorhinal cortex; perirhinal cortex; Ileal epithelium; crypt of lieberkuhn of small intestine; lactiferous gland; choroid plexus of fourth ventricle; CA3 field; otic vesicle; More reference expression data
BioGPS	n/a
Gene ontology
Molecular function	carbohydrate binding; molecular function
Cellular component	membrane; integral component of membrane; endoplasmic reticulum membrane
Biological process	biological process
Sources:Amigo / QuickGO
Orthologs
Databases	NCBI: entry; OMA: entry
Species	Human	Mouse
Entrez	23420	211548
Ensembl	ENSG00000103512	ENSMUSG00000030835
UniProt	Q15155	Q6GQT9
RefSeq (mRNA)	NM_014287	NM_153057
RefSeq (protein)	NP_055102	NP_694697
Location (UCSC)	Chr 16: 14.83 – 14.9 Mb	Chr 7: 45.68 – 45.73 Mb
PubMed search
- Wikidata
View/Edit Human	View/Edit Mouse

Nodal modulator 1 is a protein that in humans is encoded by the NOMO1 gene.

This gene encodes a protein originally thought to be related to the collagenase gene family. This gene is one of three highly similar genes in a region of duplication located on the p arm of chromosome 16. These three genes encode closely related proteins that may have the same function. The protein encoded by one of these genes has been identified as part of a protein complex that participates in the Nodal signaling pathway during vertebrate development. Mutations in ABCC6, which is located nearby, rather than mutations in this gene are associated with pseudoxanthoma elasticum (PXE).
