= PRMT7 =

Protein-coding gene in humans

Identifiers
- Aliases: PRMT7, protein arginine methyltransferase 7, SBIDDS
- External IDs: OMIM: 610087; MGI: 2384879; GeneCards: PRMT7
Enzyme activity
EC #	BRENDA	ExPASy	KEGG	MetaCyc
2.1.1.321	↗	↗	↗	↗

Gene location (Human)
Chr.	Chromosome 16 (human)
Band	16q22.1	Start	68,310,951 bp
Band	16q22.1	End	68,360,852 bp

Gene location (Mouse)
Chr.	Chromosome 8 (mouse)
Band	8|8 D3	Start	106,937,568 bp
Band	8|8 D3	End	106,979,426 bp
RNA expression pattern
Bgee	Human / Mouse (ortholog); Top expressed in: right hemisphere of cerebellum; right frontal lobe; right uterine tube; apex of heart; muscle of thigh; tibial nerve; sural nerve; ventricular zone; right ovary; left ovary / Top expressed in: spermatid; spermatocyte; seminiferous tubule; triceps brachii muscle; temporal muscle; epiblast; maxillary prominence; skeletal muscle tissue; mandibular prominence; primitive streak; More reference expression data
BioGPS	n/a
Gene ontology
Molecular function	methyltransferase activity; transferase activity; protein-arginine omega-N monomethyltransferase activity; [myelin basic protein-arginine N-methyltransferase activity]; histone methyltransferase activity (H4-R3 specific); S-adenosylmethionine-dependent methyltransferase activity; histone binding; ribonucleoprotein complex binding; protein-arginine omega-N symmetric methyltransferase activity; histone-arginine N-methyltransferase activity; protein-arginine N-methyltransferase activity; protein-arginine omega-N asymmetric methyltransferase activity
Cellular component	cytoplasm; cytosol; nucleus; fibrillar center; nucleoplasm
Biological process	regulation of gene expression by genetic imprinting; cell differentiation; histone H4-R3 methylation; DNA methylation involved in gamete generation; transcription, DNA-templated; spliceosomal snRNP assembly; histone arginine methylation; methylation; peptidyl-arginine methylation; histone methylation; regulation of protein binding; protein methylation; peptidyl-arginine N-methylation; peptidyl-arginine omega-N-methylation; peptidyl-arginine methylation, to symmetrical-dimethyl arginine; regulation of transcription, DNA-templated; peptidyl-arginine methylation, to asymmetrical-dimethyl arginine; chromatin organization
Sources:Amigo / QuickGO
Orthologs
Databases	NCBI: entry; OMA: entry
Species	Human	Mouse
Entrez	54496	214572
Ensembl	ENSG00000132600	ENSMUSG00000060098
UniProt	Q9NVM4	Q922X9
RefSeq (mRNA)	NM_001184824; NM_001290018; NM_019023; NM_001351143; NM_001351144 NM_001378018; NM_001378020; NM_001378021; NM_001378022; NM_001378023	NM_145404
RefSeq (protein)	NP_001171753; NP_001276947; NP_061896; NP_001338072; NP_001338073 NP_001364947; NP_001364949; NP_001364950; NP_001364951; NP_001364952; NP_001276947.1; NP_061896.1	NP_663379
Location (UCSC)	Chr 16: 68.31 – 68.36 Mb	Chr 8: 106.94 – 106.98 Mb
PubMed search
- Wikidata
View/Edit Human	View/Edit Mouse

Protein arginine methyltransferase 7 (PRMT7) is a protein that in humans is encoded by the PRMT7 gene. Arginine methylation is an apparently irreversible protein modification catalyzed by arginine methyltransferases, such as PRMT7, using S-adenosylmethionine (AdoMet) as the methyl donor. Arginine methylation is implicated in signal transduction, RNA transport, and RNA splicing.

PRMT7 was initially identified as a Type II protein lysine methyltransferase, indicating its role in the symmetric dimethylation of arginine residues. However, it was later reclassified as a Type III protein lysine methyltransferase, meaning it facilitates the mono-methylation of arginine residues. As of 2023, PRMT7 remains the sole member of the Type III PRMT category.
