= UNKL =

Protein-coding gene in the species Homo sapiens

Identifiers
- Aliases: UNKL, C16orf28, ZC3H5L, ZC3HDC5L, unkempt family like zinc finger, unk like zinc finger
- External IDs: OMIM: 617463; MGI: 1921404; GeneCards: UNKL

Gene location (Human)
Chr.	Chromosome 16 (human)
Band	16p13.3	Start	1,363,205 bp
Band	16p13.3	End	1,414,751 bp

Gene location (Mouse)
Chr.	Chromosome 17 (mouse)
Band	17|17 A3.3	Start	25,188,397 bp
Band	17|17 A3.3	End	25,234,443 bp
RNA expression pattern
Bgee	Human / Mouse (ortholog); Top expressed in: secondary oocyte; sural nerve; germinal epithelium; right uterine tube; Brodmann area 23; right hemisphere of cerebellum; parietal pleura; left ovary; visceral pleura; right adrenal gland / Top expressed in: otolith organ; utricle; trigeminal ganglion; cerebellar vermis; Epithelium of choroid plexus; lobe of cerebellum; ciliary body; vestibular membrane of cochlear duct; mammillary body; supraoptic nucleus; More reference expression data
BioGPS	n/a
Gene ontology
Molecular function	metal ion binding; protein binding; ubiquitin-protein transferase activity; transferase activity; DNA-binding transcription factor activity, RNA polymerase II-specific
Cellular component	nucleus; cytoplasm; cytosol
Biological process	protein ubiquitination; protein polyubiquitination; regulation of transcription by RNA polymerase II
Sources:Amigo / QuickGO
Orthologs
Databases	NCBI: entry; OMA: entry
Species	Human	Mouse
Entrez	64718	74154
Ensembl	ENSG00000059145	ENSMUSG00000015127
UniProt	Q9H9P5	Q5FWH2
RefSeq (mRNA)	NM_001037125; NM_001193388; NM_001193389; NM_001276414; NM_001367622 NM_001370526; NM_001372107; NM_024023	NM_001197024; NM_001290736; NM_028789; NM_001357876; NM_001357877
RefSeq (protein)	NP_001032202; NP_001180317; NP_001180318; NP_001263343; NP_001354551 NP_001357455; NP_001359036	NP_001183953; NP_001277665; NP_083065; NP_001344805; NP_001344806
Location (UCSC)	Chr 16: 1.36 – 1.41 Mb	Chr 17: 25.19 – 25.23 Mb
PubMed search
- Wikidata
View/Edit Human	View/Edit Mouse

RING finger protein unkempt-like is a protein that in humans is encoded by the UNKL gene.

This protein is most commonly known as UNK-like Zinc Finger. According to NCBI.com, other names for this protein include ZC3H5L, C16orf28 and ZC3HDC5L. This gene is homologous to the Drosophila UNK finger, hence the term "UNK-like finger" for humans. The UNKL protein is homologous to the UNK protein since they share a lot of similarities in structure and function. The UNKL protein can also be found in several other vertebrates due to it being part of the vertebrata lineage. According to OMIM.org, "UNKL shares 87% and 40% identity with mouse and Drosophila orthologs, respectively".

The UNKL gene for this protein belongs to a gene group called Ring Finger Proteins (RNF). According to the HUGO Gene Nomenclature Committee, Ring Finger Proteins are a motif containing "a Cys 3 HisCys 4 amino acid...which binds two zinc cations". RING fingers are a common molecule used for the ubiquitination of certain substrates.

The UNKL gene is found on Chromosome 16 in the human genome. Because the UNKL gene is part of the human genome, it can play a role in aiding human development and regulating certain biological pathways. Chromosome 16 is an essential somatic chromosome for human development and production of molecules such as Hemoglobin.

Raymond S. Brown reports the UNKL protein shows "RNA binding activity". Raymond S. Brown claims that this phenomenon is found in proteins "such as the HIV-1 nucleocapsid (CCHC) [2, 3], reovirus σ3 (C2H2) [4] and barley stripe mosaic virus γb protein (C4C/H) [5]".

== Structure ==
The entire protein itself consists of a 680 Amino acid-long chain, making its molecular weight to be about 73828 Da. This protein can be found in six different Isoforms due to slight differences in genetic composition.

The UNKL protein has a few different regions, some of which are called "fingers". These regions are termed fingers due to their structural 3D similarity to human fingers. UNKL has two different types of fingers, consisting of four zinc fingers near the N-terminus and one RING finger near the C-terminus.

The RING finger region for this gene is 40-60 Amino acids long. This makes the weight of the RING finger to be about 720-1,080 Da. The RING finger can be found close to the C-terminal region.

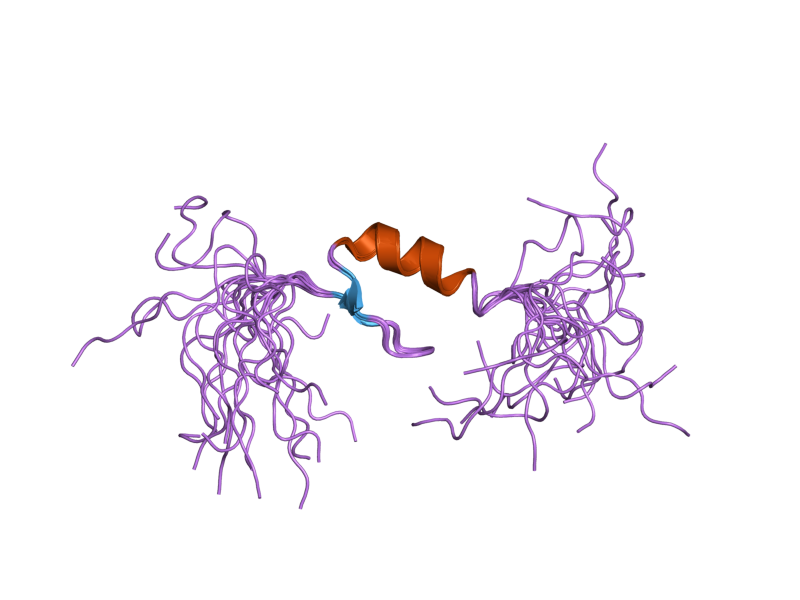
Zinc Finger Protein Domain https://www.ebi.ac.uk/

The zinc fingers for this protein are found at the N-terminal region of the molecule. The weight of the zinc finger would be about 450 Da since the zinc finger is about 25 Amino acids long. Zinc fingers consist of a 2 Cysteine- 2 Histidine motif and are considered to be proteins that bind to RNA for regulatory purposes.

UNKL is possibly part of a larger molecule known as the putative E3 Ligase complex. According to Quan Yang et al at NCBI.com, "E3 ubiquitin ligases are a large family of enzymes that join in a three-enzyme ubiquitination cascade together with ubiquitin activating enzyme E1 and ubiquitin conjugating enzyme E2".

== Functions ==
The UNKL protein acts as a Transferase in certain molecular functions, including a possible role in the E3 Ligase complex. These E3 Ligases function as a facilitator for the ubiquitination of a substrate protein. Ubiquitination is a post-translational modification in which a protein is attached to another protein via a Transferase. In the case of UNKL, the substrate that may be ubiquitinated by the E3 Ligase complex is the SMARCD2/BAF60b substrate.

Because UNKL is indicated to be part of the E3 Ligase function, this means that it can also have a role in regulation and cell stress response. According to Quan Yang et al at NCBI.com, "E3 ligases are significantly involved in cancer progression, such as proliferation, invasion, apoptosis, DNA damage and repair, metabolism, immunity and many other aspects".

A big part of the UNKL regulation is having the ability to break down proteins. This can be done for several reasons, such as recycling amino acids within the proteins, maintaining homeostasis, or getting rid of non-functional proteins.

One of the alternate Isoforms of this protein, Isoform 4, has specialized functions. This includes specialized interactions with RAC1, a GTPase. The Isoform 4 of the UNKL protein also has the ability to move between the cytoplasm and the nucleus.

Since there hasn't been much research on the possible functions of this protein, the UNLK protein's functionality is still being researched in order to fully understand the biological mechanisms and purpose for this molecule.
