= VPS35L =

Protein-coding gene in the species Homo sapiens

Identifiers
- Aliases: VPS35L, chromosome 16 open reading frame 62, VPS35 endosomal protein sorting factor like, C16orf62, EC97, RTSC3
- External IDs: MGI: 1918767; HomoloGene: 10659; GeneCards: VPS35L; OMA:VPS35L - orthologs

Gene location (Human)
Chr.	Chromosome 16 (human)
Band	16p12.3	Start	19,555,240 bp
Band	16p12.3	End	19,706,793 bp

Gene location (Mouse)
Chr.	Chromosome 7 (mouse)
Band	7|7 F2	Start	118,339,449 bp
Band	7|7 F2	End	118,442,189 bp
RNA expression pattern
Bgee	Human / Mouse (ortholog); Top expressed in: buccal mucosa cell; stromal cell of endometrium; epithelium of colon; corpus callosum; C1 segment; oocyte; right adrenal cortex; smooth muscle tissue; Brodmann area 9; putamen / Top expressed in: zygote; tail of embryo; yolk sac; primary oocyte; genital tubercle; interventricular septum; neural tube; secondary oocyte; epithelium of small intestine; dentate gyrus of hippocampal formation granule cell; More reference expression data
BioGPS	n/a
Gene ontology
Molecular function	protein binding
Cellular component	integral component of membrane; endosome; early endosome; membrane; plasma membrane; ficolin-1-rich granule membrane
Biological process	protein transport; Golgi to plasma membrane transport; neutrophil degranulation; endocytic recycling
Sources:Amigo / QuickGO
Orthologs
Species	Human	Mouse
Entrez	57020	71517
Ensembl	ENSG00000103544	ENSMUSG00000030982
UniProt	Q7Z3J2	Q8BWQ6
RefSeq (mRNA)	NM_001300743; NM_020314; NM_001365293; NM_001365294; NM_001365295	NM_027815
RefSeq (protein)	NP_001287672; NP_064710; NP_001352222; NP_001352223; NP_001352224	NP_082091
Location (UCSC)	Chr 16: 19.56 – 19.71 Mb	Chr 7: 118.34 – 118.44 Mb
PubMed search
- Wikidata
View/Edit Human	View/Edit Mouse

(See also: List of proteins in the human body)

VPS35L is a gene encoding the VPS35 Endosomal Protein Sorting Factor Like protein.
