= NUPR1 =

Protein-coding gene in the species Homo sapiens

Identifiers
- Aliases: NUPR1, COM1, P8, nuclear protein 1, transcriptional regulator
- External IDs: OMIM: 614812; MGI: 1891834; GeneCards: NUPR1

Gene location (Human)
Chr.	Chromosome 16 (human)
Band	16p11.2	Start	28,532,708 bp
Band	16p11.2	End	28,539,008 bp

Gene location (Mouse)
Chr.	Chromosome 7 (mouse)
Band	7|7 F3	Start	126,222,421 bp
Band	7|7 F3	End	126,230,033 bp
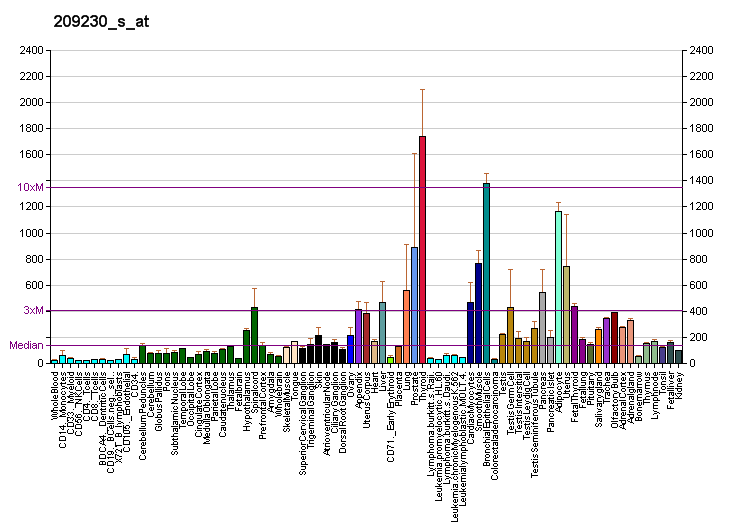
RNA expression pattern
Bgee	Human / Mouse (ortholog); Top expressed in: left lobe of thyroid gland; right lobe of thyroid gland; body of pancreas; right adrenal cortex; gastric mucosa; left adrenal cortex; muscle layer of sigmoid colon; skin of abdomen; skin of leg; right lung / Top expressed in: submandibular gland; epithelium of lens; lacrimal gland; calvaria; crypt of lieberkuhn of small intestine; tunica media of zone of aorta; ascending aorta; epithelium of stomach; parotid gland; pyloric antrum; More reference expression data
BioGPS	More reference expression data
Gene ontology
Molecular function	chromatin binding; DNA binding; protein binding; transcription coactivator activity; acetyltransferase activator activity
Cellular component	nucleus; cytosol; protein-DNA complex; cytoplasm; perinuclear region of cytoplasm
Biological process	skeletal muscle cell differentiation; intrinsic apoptotic signaling pathway in response to DNA damage by p53 class mediator; negative regulation of cell cycle; male gonad development; regulation of transcription, DNA-templated; acute inflammatory response; negative regulation of fibroblast proliferation; regulation of female gonad development; response to toxic substance; transcription, DNA-templated; protein acetylation; positive regulation of protein modification process; positive regulation of apoptotic process; regulation of transcription by RNA polymerase II; cell population proliferation; protein-containing complex assembly; negative regulation of cell population proliferation; positive regulation of catalytic activity; positive regulation of proteasomal protein catabolic process; positive regulation of nucleic acid-templated transcription; regulation of autophagy; negative regulation of autophagy; negative regulation of cardiac muscle cell apoptotic process; negative regulation of apoptotic process; negative regulation of DNA-binding transcription factor activity; positive regulation of neuron apoptotic process; negative regulation of glycolytic process; negative regulation of epithelial cell proliferation; negative regulation of programmed necrotic cell death; positive regulation of neuroinflammatory response; negative regulation of autophagosome assembly; positive regulation of oxidative phosphorylation; negative regulation of epithelial cell apoptotic process; negative regulation of type B pancreatic cell proliferation; regulation of response to endoplasmic reticulum stress; positive regulation of intrinsic apoptotic signaling pathway
Sources:Amigo / QuickGO
Orthologs
Databases	NCBI: entry; OMA: entry
Species	Human	Mouse
Entrez	26471	56312
Ensembl	ENSG00000176046	ENSMUSG00000030717
UniProt	O60356	Q9WTK0
RefSeq (mRNA)	NM_012385; NM_001042483	NM_019738
RefSeq (protein)	NP_001035948; NP_036517	NP_062712
Location (UCSC)	Chr 16: 28.53 – 28.54 Mb	Chr 7: 126.22 – 126.23 Mb
PubMed search
- Wikidata
View/Edit Human	View/Edit Mouse

Nuclear protein 1 is a protein that in humans is encoded by the NUPR1 gene.
