= PRR35 =

Protein-coding gene in the species Homo sapiens

Identifiers
- Aliases: PRR35, C16orf11, LA16c-366D1.2, proline rich 35
- External IDs: GeneCards: PRR35

Gene location (Human)
Chr.	Chromosome 16 (human)
Band	16p13.3	Start	560,394 bp
Band	16p13.3	End	565,529 bp
RNA expression pattern
Bgee	Human / Mouse (ortholog); Top expressed in: cerebellar hemisphere; right hemisphere of cerebellum; cerebellar vermis; human kidney; body of pancreas; C1 segment; right testis; left testis; prefrontal cortex; hippocampus proper / n/a; More reference expression data
BioGPS	n/a
Orthologs
Databases	NCBI: entry; OMA: entry
Species	Human	Mouse
Entrez	146325	n/a
Ensembl	ENSG00000161992	n/a
UniProt	P0CG20	n/a
RefSeq (mRNA)	NM_145270	n/a
RefSeq (protein)	NP_660313	n/a
Location (UCSC)	Chr 16: 0.56 – 0.57 Mb	n/a
PubMed search		n/a
- Wikidata
View/Edit Human

Proline rich 35 is a protein that in humans is encoded by the PRR35 gene.
