= KDM8 =

Protein-coding gene in the species Homo sapiens

Identifiers
- Aliases: KDM8, JMJD5, lysine demethylase 8
- External IDs: OMIM: 611917; MGI: 1924285; GeneCards: KDM8
Available structures
PDB	Ortholog search: PDBe RCSB
PDB	List of PDB id codes 3UYJ, 4AAP, 4GAZ, 4GJY, 4GJZ, 4QU1
Enzyme activity
EC #	BRENDA	ExPASy	KEGG	MetaCyc
1.14.11.73	↗	↗	↗	↗

Gene location (Human)
Chr.	Chromosome 16 (human)
Band	16p12.1	Start	27,203,508 bp
Band	16p12.1	End	27,221,768 bp

Gene location (Mouse)
Chr.	Chromosome 7 (mouse)
Band	7|7 F3	Start	125,043,848 bp
Band	7|7 F3	End	125,061,441 bp
RNA expression pattern
Bgee	Human / Mouse (ortholog); Top expressed in: right lobe of liver; duodenum; testicle; gonad; granulocyte; apex of heart; epithelium of colon; body of pancreas; prefrontal cortex; mucosa of transverse colon / Top expressed in: retinal pigment epithelium; primitive streak; cumulus cell; neural layer of retina; embryo; morula; secondary oocyte; ventricular zone; triceps brachii muscle; Rostral migratory stream; More reference expression data
BioGPS	n/a
Gene ontology
Molecular function	dioxygenase activity; chromatin binding; oxidoreductase activity; metal ion binding; histone H3-methyl-lysine-36 demethylase activity; histone demethylase activity; protein binding; peptidase activity; hydrolase activity; aminopeptidase activity; endopeptidase activity; 2-oxoglutarate-dependent dioxygenase activity; methylated histone binding
Cellular component	nucleus; nucleoplasm; cytosol; chromosome
Biological process	regulation of transcription, DNA-templated; cell cycle; G2/M transition of mitotic cell cycle; positive regulation of transcription, DNA-templated; histone H3-K36 demethylation; transcription, DNA-templated; proteolysis; chromatin organization; protein destabilization; circadian regulation of gene expression; negative regulation of transcription, DNA-templated; rhythmic process
Sources:Amigo / QuickGO
Orthologs
Databases	NCBI: entry; OMA: entry
Species	Human	Mouse
Entrez	79831	77035
Ensembl	ENSG00000155666	ENSMUSG00000030752
UniProt	Q8N371	Q9CXT6
RefSeq (mRNA)	NM_001145348; NM_024773	NM_029842
RefSeq (protein)	NP_001138820; NP_079049	NP_084118
Location (UCSC)	Chr 16: 27.2 – 27.22 Mb	Chr 7: 125.04 – 125.06 Mb
PubMed search
- Wikidata
View/Edit Human	View/Edit Mouse

Lysine demethylase 8 is a protein that in humans is encoded by the KDM8 gene.

== Function ==
This gene likely encodes a histone lysine demethylase. Studies of a similar protein in mouse indicate a potential role for this protein as a tumor suppressor. Alternatively spliced transcript variants have been described.
