= NOB1 =

Protein-coding gene in the species Homo sapiens

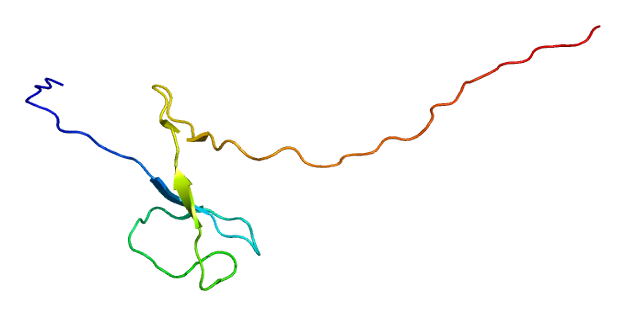

Identifiers
- Aliases: NOB1, ART-4, MST158, NOB1P, PSMD8BP1, MSTP158, NIN1/PSMD8 binding protein 1 homolog, NIN1 (RPN12) binding protein 1 homolog
- External IDs: OMIM: 613586; MGI: 1914869; GeneCards: NOB1

Gene location (Human)
Chr.	Chromosome 16 (human)
Band	16q22.1	Start	69,741,871 bp
Band	16q22.1	End	69,754,926 bp

Gene location (Mouse)
Chr.	Chromosome 8 (mouse)
Band	8|8 D3	Start	108,139,118 bp
Band	8|8 D3	End	108,151,683 bp
RNA expression pattern
Bgee	Human / Mouse (ortholog); Top expressed in: body of pancreas; right adrenal gland; right adrenal cortex; left adrenal gland; left adrenal cortex; left ovary; stromal cell of endometrium; fallopian tube; right ovary; mucosa of esophagus / Top expressed in: hand; epiblast; morula; embryo; embryo; primitive streak; otolith organ; utricle; ventricular zone; foot; More reference expression data
BioGPS	n/a
Gene ontology
Molecular function	metal ion binding; endoribonuclease activity
Cellular component	preribosome, small subunit precursor; nucleus; cytosol; nucleoplasm
Biological process	maturation of SSU-rRNA; visual perception; RNA phosphodiester bond hydrolysis, endonucleolytic; rRNA processing; cleavage involved in rRNA processing; ribosomal small subunit biogenesis
Sources:Amigo / QuickGO
Orthologs
Databases	NCBI: entry; OMA: entry
Species	Human	Mouse
Entrez	28987	67619
Ensembl	ENSG00000141101	ENSMUSG00000003848
UniProt	Q9ULX3	Q8BW10
RefSeq (mRNA)	NM_014062	NM_026277
RefSeq (protein)	NP_054781	NP_080553
Location (UCSC)	Chr 16: 69.74 – 69.75 Mb	Chr 8: 108.14 – 108.15 Mb
PubMed search
- Wikidata
View/Edit Human	View/Edit Mouse

RNA-binding protein NOB1 is a protein that in humans is encoded by the NOB1 gene.
