= ITFG3 =

Protein-coding gene in the species Homo sapiens

FAM234A

Identifiers
- Aliases: FAM234A, C16orf9, gs19, ITFG3, family with sequence similarity 234 member A
- External IDs: MGI: 2146854; HomoloGene: 12932; GeneCards: FAM234A; OMA:FAM234A - orthologs

Gene location (Human)
Chr.	Chromosome 16 (human)
Band	16p13.3	Start	234,521 bp
Band	16p13.3	End	272,183 bp

Gene location (Mouse)
Chr.	Chromosome 17 (mouse)
Band	17|17 A3.3	Start	26,211,822 bp
Band	17|17 A3.3	End	26,244,242 bp
RNA expression pattern
Bgee	Human / Mouse (ortholog); Top expressed in: apex of heart; mucosa of transverse colon; gastrocnemius muscle; C1 segment; stromal cell of endometrium; left ventricle; right auricle of heart; muscle of thigh; tibial nerve; anterior pituitary / Top expressed in: interventricular septum; otolith organ; utricle; duodenum; jejunum; stria vascularis; vestibular membrane of cochlear duct; epithelium of small intestine; colon; left colon; More reference expression data
BioGPS	n/a
Gene ontology
Molecular function	molecular function
Cellular component	membrane; cell surface; extracellular exosome; integral component of membrane
Biological process	biological process
Sources:Amigo / QuickGO
Orthologs
Species	Human	Mouse
Entrez	83986	106581
Ensembl	ENSG00000167930	ENSMUSG00000024187
UniProt	Q9H0X4	Q8C0Z1
RefSeq (mRNA)	NM_001284497; NM_032039	NM_001206335; NM_207217; NM_001357894; NM_001374603
RefSeq (protein)	NP_001271426; NP_114428	NP_001193264; NP_997100; NP_001344823
Location (UCSC)	Chr 16: 0.23 – 0.27 Mb	Chr 17: 26.21 – 26.24 Mb
PubMed search
- Wikidata
View/Edit Human	View/Edit Mouse

Protein ITFG3 also known as family with sequence similarity 234 member A (FAM234A) is a protein that in humans is encoded by the ITFG3 gene. Here, the gene is explored as encoded by mRNA found in Homo sapiens. The FAM234A gene is conserved in mice, rats, chickens, zebrafish, dogs, cows, frogs, chimpanzees, and rhesus monkeys. Orthologs of the gene can be found in at least 220 organisms including the tropical clawed frog, pandas, and Chinese hamsters. The gene is located at 16p13.3 and has a total of 19 exons. The mRNA has a total of 3224 bp and the protein has 552 aa. The molecular mass of the protein produced by this gene is 59660 Da. It is expressed in at least 27 tissue types in humans, with the greatest presence in the duodenum, fat, small intestine, and heart.

A “Newfoundland deletion” or a^{0}-thalassemia deletion has been found within the second intervening sequence of the FAM234A gene. The gene is associated with multiple red blood cell phenotypes in African Americans – though the exact function or effect of the gene was not entirely clear. Review of GeneCards’ current database on the FAM234A gene provided no additional elucidation on the function of the gene.

== Gene ==
FAM234A is located on Chromosome 16 (234,546 - 269, 943). It is 35,398 bases long, contains 11 exons, and is oriented on the plus strand in the 5' to 3' direction. Other aliases include ITFG3, C16orf9, and gs19.

There are no known paralogs of FAM234A.

The FAM234A gene is conserved in at least 220 organisms, with no evidence for conservation of the gene in single-celled organisms. Listed below is a selection of orthologs with the estimated date of divergence from human lineage in million years ago (MYA), the accession number, and the % identity to human FAM234A. This list does not contain all of the known orthologs.

Selection of Organisms with FAM234A Orthologs
Common name	Divergence from Human Lineage (MYA)	Accession number	Identity to Human (%)
Rhesus Monkey	28.1	NP_001253283.1	95
White-tufted-ear marmoset	42.6	XP_009007067.1	86
House mouse	88	NP_001344823.1	86
Chinese Hamster	88	XP_003501607.1	77
Upper Galilee mountains blind mole rat	88	XP_008849023.1	74
Golden Hamster	88	XP_005081607.1	76
Giant Panda	94	XP_011224429.1	73
Horse	94	XP_014585783.1	74
Beluga Whale	94	XP_022450014.1	73
Chicken	320	XP_414950.2	45
Blue Tit	320	XP_023792271.1	43
Bengalese Finch	320	XP_021404267.1	44
Central Bearded Dragon	320	XP_020667631.1	43
Australian saltwater crocodile	320	XP_019395600.1	47
Tropical Clawed Frog	353	NP_001121517.1	35
Zebrafish	432	XP_001336768.2	31
Barramundi Perch	432	XP_018520114.1	34
Japanese Medaka	432	XP_020567870.1	33
Elephant Shark	465	XP_007906598.1	37
Rat	88	NP_001009701.1	72

== mRNA ==
There are at least 11 FAM234A isoforms. Aside from the longest transcript, the other isoforms differ by truncation, primarily at the 3' end. This results in a wide variation in sequence length between isoforms.

== Protein ==
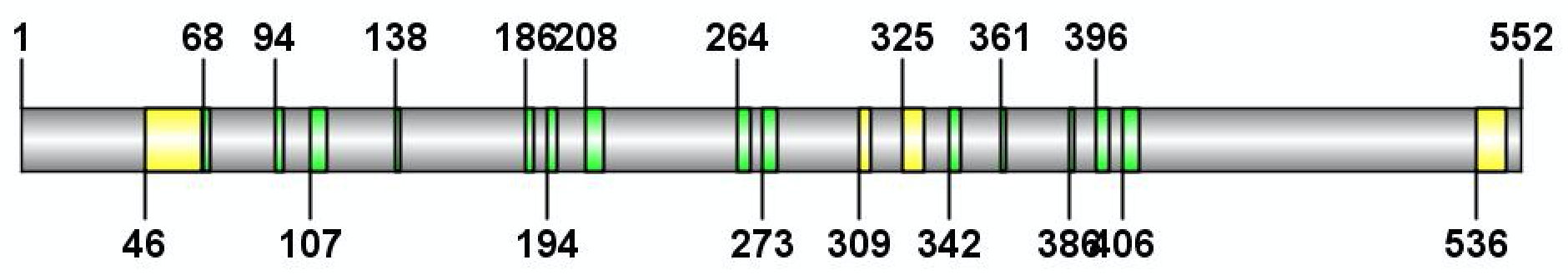
Predicted Features of FAM234A Secondary Structure. Numbered according to amino acid in the FAM234A protein, areas where there is a predicted alpha-helix are highlighted in yellow. Areas that are predicted to be beta-strands are highlighted in green.

The FAM234A gene encodes a serine and leucine rich protein titled the "FAM234A Protein" or ITFG3. The encoded protein is 552 amino acids in length with a predicted molecular weight of 59,660Da and a basal isoelectric point of 5.84. The FAM234A protein has a notable hydrophobic region from position 49-70 in the amino acid sequence that correlates with one of the two trans-membrane regions found on FAM234A. FAM234A has membrane topology type 3a, indicating multiple trans-membrane regions with its N-terminus facing the cytosol. The protein is predicted to be located in the endoplasmic reticulum, with portions of it found within the endoplasmic reticulum lumen. Within the cell, FAM234A has also been localized to the ribosomes and nucleus.
