= Small nucleolar RNA SNORD71 =

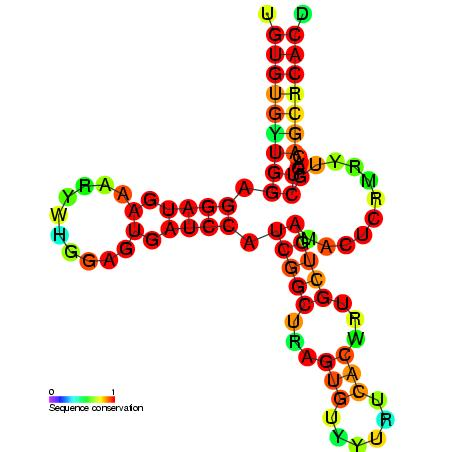
- Predicted secondary structure and sequence conservation of SNORD71

Identifiers
- Symbol: SNORD71
- Alt. Symbols: snoHBII-239
- Rfam: RF00576

Other data
- RNA type: Gene; snRNA; snoRNA; C/D-box
- Domain: Eukaryota
- GO: GO:0006396 GO:0005730
- SO: SO:0000593
- PDB structures: PDBe

Small nucleolar RNA SNORD71

Identifiers
- Aliases: SNORD71, HBII-239, MIRN768, hsa-mir-768, small nucleolar RNA, C/D box 71
- External IDs: GeneCards: SNORD71

Gene location (Human)
Chr.	Chromosome 16 (human)
Band	16q22.2	Start	71,758,402 bp
Band	16q22.2	End	71,758,487 bp
RNA expression pattern
Bgee	Human / Mouse (ortholog); Top expressed in: sural nerve; Achilles tendon; corpus callosum; bone marrow; Brodmann area 9; liver; blood; monocyte; kidney; stomach / n/a; More reference expression data
BioGPS	n/a
Orthologs
Databases	NCBI: entry; OMA: entry
Species	Human	Mouse
Entrez	692111	n/a
Ensembl	ENSG00000223224	n/a
UniProt	n a	n/a
RefSeq (mRNA)	n/a	n/a
RefSeq (protein)	n/a	n/a
Location (UCSC)	Chr 16: 71.76 – 71.76 Mb	n/a
PubMed search		n/a
- Wikidata
View/Edit Human

In molecular biology, snoRNA HBII-239 belongs to the family of C/D snoRNAs. It is the human orthologue of the mouse MBII-239 described and is predicted to guide 2'O-ribose methylation of 5.8S rRNA on residue U14.
