= Calcium-regulated heat stable protein 1 =

Protein found in humans

CARHSP1

Identifiers
- Aliases: CARHSP1, CRHSP-24, CSDC1, CRHSP24, calcium regulated heat stable protein 1
- External IDs: OMIM: 616885; MGI: 1196368; GeneCards: CARHSP1
Available structures
PDB	Ortholog search: PDBe RCSB
PDB	List of PDB id codes 3AQQ

Gene location (Human)
Chr.	Chromosome 16 (human)
Band	16p13.2	Start	8,852,942 bp
Band	16p13.2	End	8,869,012 bp

Gene location (Mouse)
Chr.	Chromosome 16 (mouse)
Band	16 A1|16 4.26 cM	Start	8,476,444 bp
Band	16 A1|16 4.26 cM	End	8,490,019 bp
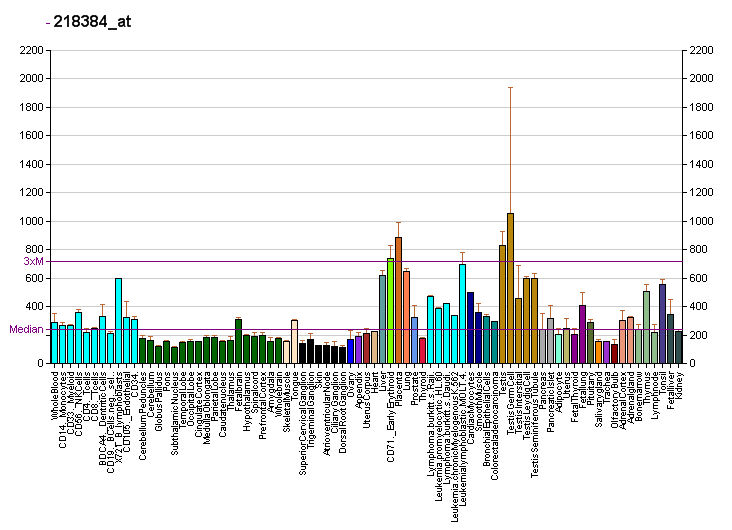
RNA expression pattern
Bgee	Human / Mouse (ortholog); Top expressed in: right testis; left testis; ganglionic eminence; ventricular zone; right adrenal gland; right adrenal cortex; left adrenal gland; left adrenal cortex; right lobe of liver; right lung / Top expressed in: lens; granulocyte; cumulus cell; epithelium of lens; fetal liver hematopoietic progenitor cell; secondary oocyte; medial ganglionic eminence; tibiofemoral joint; blood; renal corpuscle; More reference expression data
BioGPS	More reference expression data
Gene ontology
Molecular function	mRNA 3'-UTR binding; DNA binding; phosphatase binding; protein binding; RNA binding; nucleic acid binding; DNA-binding transcription factor activity, RNA polymerase II-specific
Cellular component	cytoplasmic exosome (RNase complex); cytosol; P-body; P granule; cytoplasm
Biological process	intracellular signal transduction; regulation of transcription, DNA-templated; regulation of mRNA stability; regulation of transcription by RNA polymerase II
Sources:Amigo / QuickGO
Orthologs
Databases	NCBI: entry; OMA: entry
Species	Human	Mouse
Entrez	23589	52502
Ensembl	ENSG00000153048	ENSMUSG00000008393
UniProt	Q9Y2V2	Q9CR86
RefSeq (mRNA)	NM_001042476; NM_001278260; NM_001278261; NM_001278262; NM_001278263 NM_001278264; NM_001278265; NM_001278266; NM_014316	NM_025821
RefSeq (protein)	NP_001035941; NP_001265189; NP_001265190; NP_001265191; NP_001265192 NP_001265193; NP_001265194; NP_001265195; NP_055131	NP_080097
Location (UCSC)	Chr 16: 8.85 – 8.87 Mb	Chr 16: 8.48 – 8.49 Mb
PubMed search
- Wikidata
View/Edit Human	View/Edit Mouse

Calcium-regulated heat stable protein 1 (CARHSP1) also known as calcium-regulated heat-stable protein of 24 kDa (CRHSP-24) is a protein that in humans is encoded by the CARHSP1 gene.
