= Zinc finger protein 629 =

Protein found in humans

ZNF629

Identifiers
- Aliases: ZNF629, ZNF, ZNF65, zinc finger protein 629
- External IDs: MGI: 2444524; GeneCards: ZNF629

Gene location (Human)
Chr.	Chromosome 16 (human)
Band	16p11.2	Start	30,778,456 bp
Band	16p11.2	End	30,787,205 bp

Gene location (Mouse)
Chr.	Chromosome 7 (mouse)
Band	7|7 F3	Start	127,607,031 bp
Band	7|7 F3	End	127,615,797 bp
RNA expression pattern
Bgee	Human / Mouse (ortholog); Top expressed in: tendon of biceps brachii; apex of heart; paraflocculus of cerebellum; nasal epithelium; tibialis anterior muscle; myocardium of left ventricle; endothelial cell; ganglionic eminence; lateral nuclear group of thalamus; right ventricle / Top expressed in: interventricular septum; hand; otic vesicle; otolith organ; genital tubercle; utricle; tail of embryo; foot; ventricular zone; ganglionic eminence; More reference expression data
BioGPS	n/a
Gene ontology
Molecular function	DNA-binding transcription factor activity; DNA binding; metal ion binding; nucleic acid binding; DNA-binding transcription factor activity, RNA polymerase II-specific
Cellular component	nucleus
Biological process	regulation of transcription, DNA-templated; transcription, DNA-templated; regulation of transcription by RNA polymerase II
Sources:Amigo / QuickGO
Orthologs
Databases	NCBI: entry; OMA: entry
Species	Human	Mouse
Entrez	23361	320683
Ensembl	ENSG00000102870	ENSMUSG00000045639
UniProt	Q9UEG4	Q6A085
RefSeq (mRNA)	NM_001080417; NM_001345970	NM_177226
RefSeq (protein)	NP_001073886; NP_001332899	NP_796200; NP_001349125; NP_001349126; NP_001391329; NP_001391331 NP_001391332; NP_001391333; NP_001391334
Location (UCSC)	Chr 16: 30.78 – 30.79 Mb	Chr 7: 127.61 – 127.62 Mb
PubMed search
- Wikidata
View/Edit Human	View/Edit Mouse

Zinc finger protein 629 is a protein that in humans is encoded by the ZNF629 gene.
