= SplA/ryanodine receptor domain and SOCS box containing 3 =

Protein-coding gene in humans

SPSB3

Identifiers
- Aliases: SPSB3, C16orf31, SSB3, Spla/ryanodine receptor domain and socs box containing 3
- External IDs: OMIM: 611659; MGI: 1891471; GeneCards: SPSB3

Gene location (Human)
Chr.	Chromosome 16 (human)
Band	16p13.3	Start	1,776,712 bp
Band	16p13.3	End	1,793,700 bp

Gene location (Mouse)
Chr.	Chromosome 17 (mouse)
Band	17|17 A3.3	Start	25,105,617 bp
Band	17|17 A3.3	End	25,111,126 bp
RNA expression pattern
Bgee	Human / Mouse (ortholog); Top expressed in: pancreatic ductal cell; right hemisphere of cerebellum; granulocyte; skin of thigh; skin of hip; gastric mucosa; endothelial cell; right lobe of liver; skin of abdomen; apex of heart / Top expressed in: otic vesicle; spermatocyte; saccule; spermatid; otic placode; lip; seminiferous tubule; right kidney; esophagus; thymus; More reference expression data
BioGPS	n/a
Gene ontology
Molecular function	protein binding; ubiquitin-protein transferase activity
Cellular component	cytosol; SCF ubiquitin ligase complex
Biological process	protein ubiquitination; post-translational protein modification; ubiquitin-dependent protein catabolic process; proteasome-mediated ubiquitin-dependent protein catabolic process
Sources:Amigo / QuickGO
Orthologs
Databases	NCBI: entry; OMA: entry
Species	Human	Mouse
Entrez	90864	79043
Ensembl	ENSG00000162032	ENSMUSG00000024160
UniProt	Q6PJ21	Q571F5
RefSeq (mRNA)	NM_080861; NM_001324081	NM_001163750; NM_001163751; NM_027141; NM_001374602; NM_001400229 NM_001400231; NM_001400234; NM_001400235; NM_001400236; NM_001400237; NM_001400238; NM_001400240
RefSeq (protein)	NP_001311010; NP_543137	NP_001157222; NP_001157223; NP_081417; NP_001361531; NP_001387158 NP_001387160; NP_001387163; NP_001387164; NP_001387165; NP_001387166; NP_001387167; NP_001387169
Location (UCSC)	Chr 16: 1.78 – 1.79 Mb	Chr 17: 25.11 – 25.11 Mb
PubMed search
- Wikidata
View/Edit Human	View/Edit Mouse

SPRY domain

Identifiers
- Symbol: SPRY
- Pfam: PF00622
- InterPro: IPR003877
Available protein structures:
- PDB: IPR003877 PF00622 (ECOD; PDBsum)
- AlphaFold: IPR003877; PF00622

SplA/ryanodine receptor domain and SOCS box containing 3 is a protein that in humans is encoded by the SPSB3 gene.
