= CLUAP1 =

Protein-coding gene in humans

Identifiers
- Aliases: CLUAP1, CFAP22, FAP22, IFT38, clusterin associated protein 1
- External IDs: OMIM: 616787; MGI: 1924029; HomoloGene: 14831; GeneCards: CLUAP1; OMA:CLUAP1 - orthologs

Gene location (Human)
Chr.	Chromosome 16 (human)
Band	16p13.3	Start	3,500,976 bp
Band	16p13.3	End	3,539,048 bp

Gene location (Mouse)
Chr.	Chromosome 16 (mouse)
Band	16|16 A1	Start	3,726,665 bp
Band	16|16 A1	End	3,759,011 bp
RNA expression pattern
Bgee	Human / Mouse (ortholog); Top expressed in: bronchial epithelial cell; Achilles tendon; olfactory zone of nasal mucosa; ventricular zone; left testis; right uterine tube; right testis; gonad; testicle; sperm / Top expressed in: spermatid; spermatocyte; interventricular septum; seminiferous tubule; supraoptic nucleus; condyle; fossa; neural layer of retina; aortic valve; trigeminal ganglion; More reference expression data
BioGPS	n/a
Gene ontology
Molecular function	protein binding
Cellular component	intraciliary transport particle B; centrosome; cell projection; ciliary tip; intracellular membrane-bounded organelle; nucleus; nucleoplasm; cilium
Biological process	cell projection organization; intraciliary transport involved in cilium assembly; cilium assembly
Sources:Amigo / QuickGO
Orthologs
Species	Human	Mouse
Entrez	23059	76779
Ensembl	ENSG00000103351	ENSMUSG00000014232
UniProt	Q96AJ1	Q8R3P7
RefSeq (mRNA)	NM_015041; NM_024793; NM_001330454	NM_029738
RefSeq (protein)	NP_001317383; NP_055856; NP_079069	NP_084014
Location (UCSC)	Chr 16: 3.5 – 3.54 Mb	Chr 16: 3.73 – 3.76 Mb
PubMed search
- Wikidata
View/Edit Human	View/Edit Mouse

Clusterin associated protein 1, also known as CLUAP1, is a human gene.
