= TANGO6 =

Protein-coding gene in the species Homo sapiens

Identifiers
- Aliases: TANGO6, TMCO7, transport and golgi organization 6 homolog
- External IDs: MGI: 2142786; GeneCards: TANGO6

Gene location (Human)
| Chr. | Chromosome 16 (human) |
| Band | 16q22.1 | Start | 68,843,531 bp |
| Band | 16q22.1 | End | 69,085,182 bp |

Gene location (Mouse)
| Chr. | Chromosome 8 (mouse) |
| Band | 8|8 D3 | Start | 107,409,700 bp |
| Band | 8|8 D3 | End | 107,578,071 bp |
RNA expression pattern
| Bgee | Human / Mouse (ortholog); Top expressed in: bone marrow cell; gonad; Achilles tendon; right lobe of liver; testicle; ganglionic eminence; ventricular zone; epithelium of colon; gastrocnemius muscle; sural nerve / Top expressed in: otic vesicle; Rostral migratory stream; tail of embryo; granulocyte; muscle of thigh; lumbar subsegment of spinal cord; right kidney; epiblast; yolk sac; embryo; More reference expression data |
| BioGPS | n/a |
Orthologs
| Databases | NCBI: entry; OMA: entry |
| Species | Human | Mouse |
| Entrez | 79613 | 272538 |
| Ensembl | ENSG00000103047 | ENSMUSG00000041949 |
| UniProt | Q9C0B7 | Q8C3S2 |
| RefSeq (mRNA) | NM_024562 | NM_173037 |
| RefSeq (protein) | NP_078838 | NP_766625 |
| Location (UCSC) | Chr 16: 68.84 – 69.09 Mb | Chr 8: 107.41 – 107.58 Mb |
| PubMed search |
- Wikidata
| View/Edit Human | View/Edit Mouse |

Transport and Golgi organization protein 6 homolog also known as transmembrane and coiled-coil domain-containing protein 7 is a protein that in humans is encoded by the TANGO6 gene.
