= CIAPIN1 =

Protein-coding gene in humans

Identifiers
- Aliases: CIAPIN1, 2810413N20Rik, Anamorsin, DRE2, PRO0915, cytokine induced apoptosis inhibitor 1, CIAE2
- External IDs: OMIM: 608943; MGI: 1922083; GeneCards: CIAPIN1
Available structures
PDB	Ortholog search: PDBe RCSB
PDB	List of PDB id codes 2LD4, 2YUI, 4M7R

Gene location (Human)
Chr.	Chromosome 16 (human)
Band	16q21	Start	57,428,187 bp
Band	16q21	End	57,447,420 bp

Gene location (Mouse)
Chr.	Chromosome 8 (mouse)
Band	8|8 C5	Start	95,546,432 bp
Band	8|8 C5	End	95,564,986 bp
RNA expression pattern
Bgee	Human / Mouse (ortholog); Top expressed in: oocyte; secondary oocyte; left testis; right testis; sperm; mucosa of transverse colon; right adrenal cortex; embryo; apex of heart; ganglionic eminence / Top expressed in: otic placode; saccule; spermatocyte; spermatid; yolk sac; primitive streak; facial motor nucleus; fetal liver hematopoietic progenitor cell; neural tube; embryo; More reference expression data
BioGPS	n/a
Gene ontology
Molecular function	methyltransferase activity; iron-sulfur cluster binding; protein binding; metal ion binding; 2 iron, 2 sulfur cluster binding; 4 iron, 4 sulfur cluster binding; electron transfer activity
Cellular component	cytoplasm; mitochondrial intermembrane space; nucleolus; nucleus; nucleoplasm; mitochondrion
Biological process	methylation; metabolism; negative regulation of apoptotic process; iron-sulfur cluster assembly; apoptotic process; hemopoiesis; electron transport chain
Sources:Amigo / QuickGO
Orthologs
Databases	NCBI: entry; OMA: entry
Species	Human	Mouse
Entrez	57019	109006
Ensembl	ENSG00000005194	ENSMUSG00000031781
UniProt	Q6FI81	Q8WTY4
RefSeq (mRNA)	NM_001308347; NM_001308358; NM_020313	NM_134141
RefSeq (protein)	NP_001295276; NP_001295287; NP_064709	NP_598902
Location (UCSC)	Chr 16: 57.43 – 57.45 Mb	Chr 8: 95.55 – 95.56 Mb
PubMed search
- Wikidata
View/Edit Human	View/Edit Mouse

Anamorsin is a protein that in humans is encoded by the CIAPIN1 gene.

CIAPIN1 is a cytokine-induced inhibitor of apoptosis with no relation to apoptosis regulatory molecules of the BCL2 (MIM 151430) or CASP (see MIM 147678) families. Expression of CIAPIN1 is dependent on growth factor stimulation (Shibayama et al., 2004).[supplied by OMIM]
