= Tuberous sclerosis complex tumor suppressors =

Tuberous sclerosis complex (TSC) tumor suppressors form the TSC1-TSC2 molecular complex. Under poor growth conditions the TSC1-TSC2 complex limits cell growth. A key promoter of cell growth, mTORC1, is inhibited by the tuberous sclerosis complex. Insulin activates mTORC1 and causes dissociation of TSC from the surface of lysosomes.

Resistance to ischemia-reperfusion injury by protein restriction is mediated by activation of the tuberous sclerosis complex.
