= FOXC2-AS1 =

Non-coding RNA in the species Homo sapiens

Identifiers
- Aliases: FOXC2-AS1, ODRUL, FOXC2 antisense RNA 1
- External IDs: GeneCards: FOXC2-AS1
RNA expression pattern
Bgee	Human / Mouse (ortholog); Top expressed in: testicle; Achilles tendon; left coronary artery; ascending aorta; thoracic aorta; temporal lobe; left ventricle / n/a; More reference expression data
BioGPS	n/a
Orthologs
Databases	NCBI: entry
Species	Human	Mouse
Entrez	103752587	n/a
Ensembl	n/a	n/a
UniProt	n a	n/a
RefSeq (mRNA)	n/a	n/a
RefSeq (protein)	n/a	n/a
Location (UCSC)	n/a	n/a
PubMed search		n/a
- Wikidata
View/Edit Human

FOXC2 antisense RNA 1 is a non-coding RNA that in humans is encoded by the FOXC2-AS1 gene.
