= DEL16P12.1P11.2 =

Genetic element in humans

Chromosome 16p12.2-p11.2 deletion syndrome is a gene deletion syndrome in the position 16p12.2-p11.2 of the human genome.
